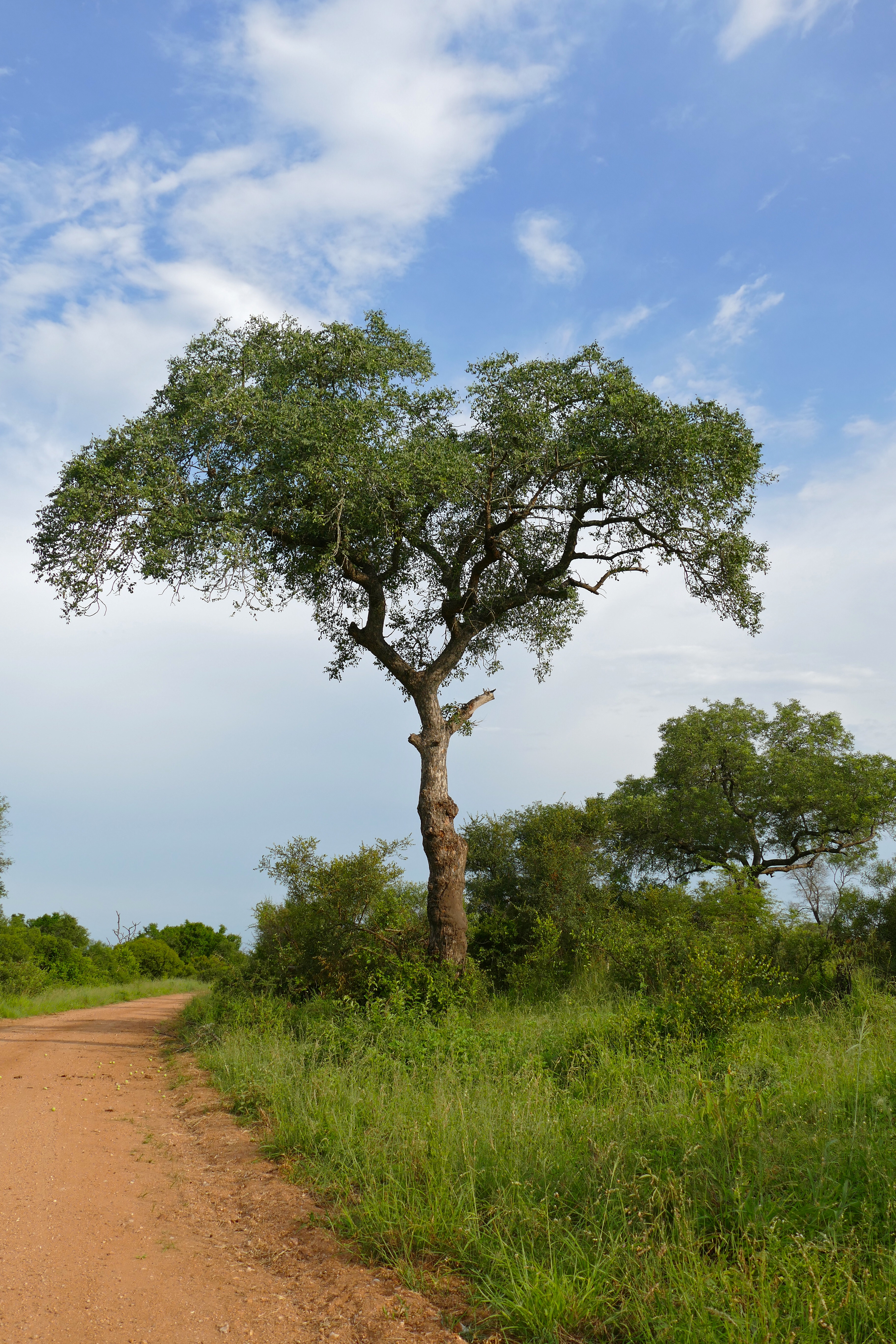
- Sclerocarya birrea (Marula)

Scientific classification
- Kingdom: Plantae
- Clade: Tracheophytes
- Clade: Angiosperms
- Clade: Eudicots
- Clade: Rosids
- Order: Sapindales
- Family: Anacardiaceae
- Subfamily: Spondiadoideae; Link

Genera
- See text

Synonyms
- Spondiadaceae Martinov

= Spondiadoideae =

Subfamily of flowering plants

Spondiadoideae is a plant subfamily in the cashew and sumac family Anacardiaceae.

== Genera ==
The following genera are recognised:

- Antrocaryon
- Choerospondias
- Cyrtocarpa
- Dracontomelon
- Haematostaphis
- Harpephyllum
- Koordersiodendron
- Lannea
- Operculicarya
- Pegia
- Pleiogynium
- Poupartia
- Poupartiopsis
- Pseudospondias
- Sclerocarya
- Solenocarpus
- Spondias
- Tapirira
