= Micronychia =

The term Micronychia may refer to

- Micronychia (plant), a genus of plants in the family Anacardiaceae
- Micronychia (fly), a genus of flies in the family Tachinidae
- abnormally small finger- and toenails
