= Mauria membranifolia =

Conservation status
- Endangered (IUCN 3.1)

Scientific classification
- Kingdom: Plantae
- Clade: Tracheophytes
- Clade: Angiosperms
- Clade: Eudicots
- Clade: Rosids
- Order: Sapindales
- Family: Anacardiaceae
- Genus: Mauria
- Species: M. membranifolia

Binomial name
- Mauria membranifolia Barfod & Holm-Niels.

Species of flowering plant

Mauria membranifolia is a species of plant in the family Anacardiaceae. It is endemic to Ecuador. Its natural habitats are subtropical or tropical dry forests and subtropical or tropical moist montane forests. It is threatened by habitat loss.
