= Spondias radlkoferi =

Scientific classification
- Kingdom: Plantae
- Clade: Tracheophytes
- Clade: Angiosperms
- Clade: Eudicots
- Clade: Rosids
- Order: Sapindales
- Family: Anacardiaceae
- Genus: Spondias
- Species: S. radlkoferi

Binomial name
- Spondias radlkoferi Donn.Sm.

Species of flowering plant

Spondias radlkoferi is a species of flowering plant in the cashew family, Anacardiaceae. It is found from southern Mexico to north-western Venezuela in riparian borders and secondary growth forests. Several species of Neotropical bats in the genus Dermanura are responsible for dispersing many of its seeds.
