= Mauria trichothyrsa =

Conservation status
- Critically Endangered (IUCN 3.1)

Scientific classification
- Kingdom: Plantae
- Clade: Tracheophytes
- Clade: Angiosperms
- Clade: Eudicots
- Clade: Rosids
- Order: Sapindales
- Family: Anacardiaceae
- Genus: Mauria
- Species: M. trichothyrsa

Binomial name
- Mauria trichothyrsa Loes.

Species of plant

Mauria trichothyrsa is a species of flowering plant in the family Anacardiaceae. It is endemic to Peru.
