= Micronychia tsiramiramy =

Conservation status
- Least Concern (IUCN 3.1)

Scientific classification
- Kingdom: Plantae
- Clade: Embryophytes
- Clade: Tracheophytes
- Clade: Angiosperms
- Clade: Eudicots
- Clade: Rosids
- Order: Sapindales
- Family: Anacardiaceae
- Genus: Micronychia
- Species: M. tsiramiramy

Binomial name
- Micronychia tsiramiramy H.Perrier

Species of flowering plant

Micronychia tsiramiramy is a species of flowering plant in the family Anacardiaceae, native to Madagascar. It can be found growing up to 1,500 m (4,900 ft) above sea level, usually in the southeast of the island.
