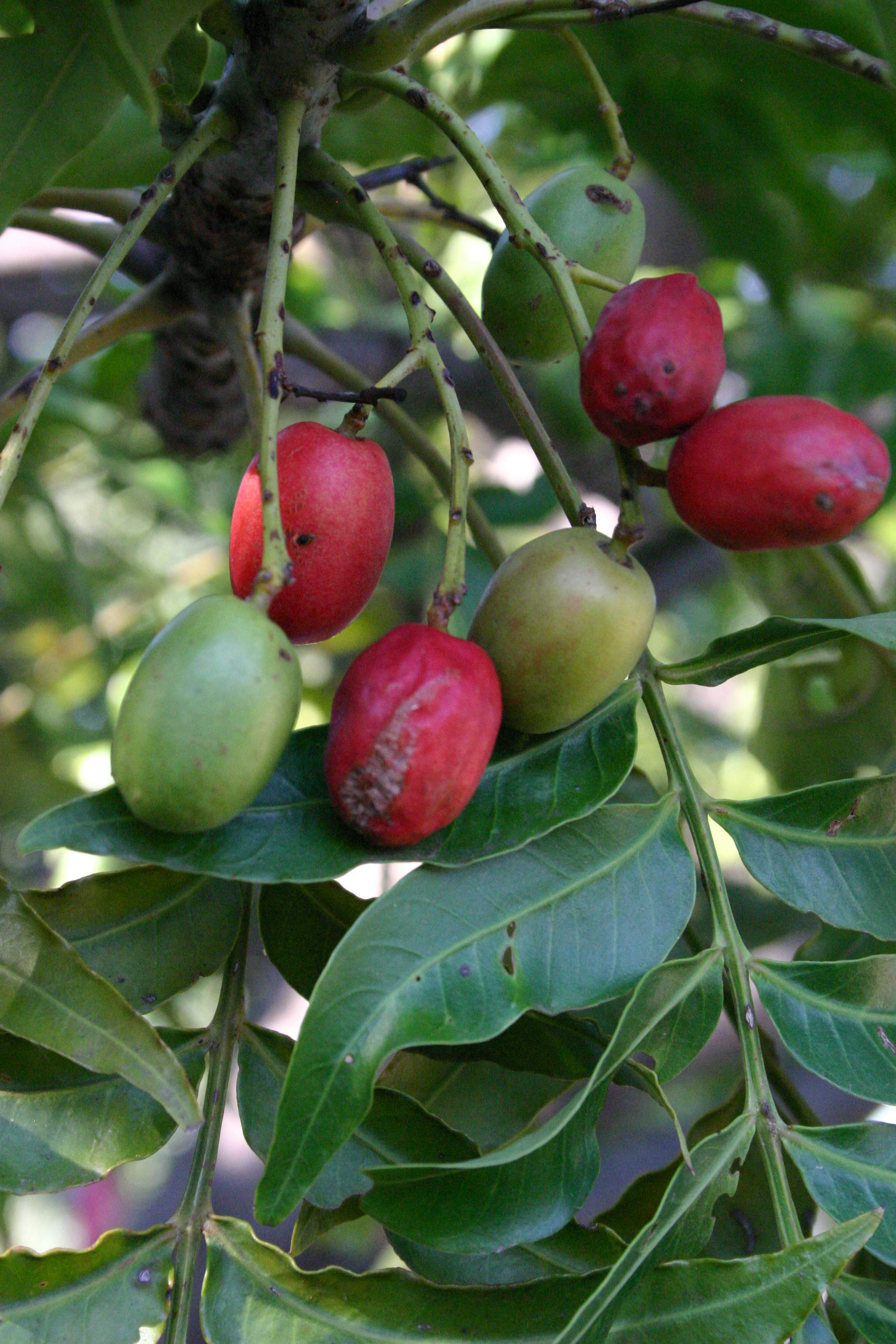

Conservation status
- Least Concern (IUCN 3.1)

Scientific classification
- Kingdom: Plantae
- Clade: Tracheophytes
- Clade: Angiosperms
- Clade: Eudicots
- Clade: Rosids
- Order: Sapindales
- Family: Anacardiaceae
- Subfamily: Spondiadoideae
- Genus: Harpephyllum; Bernh. ex C.Krauss
- Species: H. afrum

Binomial name
- Harpephyllum afrum Bernh. ex C.Krauss

Synonyms
- Tapirira afra (Bernh. ex C.Krauss) Marchand; Harpephyllum serratum Sond. ex Walp.; Odina afra Hook. ex Marchand; Spondias falcata Meisn.; Harpephyllum caffrum

= Harpephyllum =

Genus of trees

Harpephyllum is a genus of trees in the family Anacardiaceae (the cashew and mango family). The sole species is Harpephyllum afrum, a dioecious evergreen species from South Africa and Mozambique that is also cultivated. The fruit is edible.
