= Dracontomelon schmidii =

Scientific classification
- Kingdom: Plantae
- Clade: Tracheophytes
- Clade: Angiosperms
- Clade: Eudicots
- Clade: Rosids
- Order: Sapindales
- Family: Anacardiaceae
- Genus: Dracontomelon
- Species: D. schmidii

Binomial name
- Dracontomelon schmidii Tardieu, 1961

Species of tree

Dracontomelon schmidii is a tree species in the family Anacardiaceae; no subspecies are listed in the Catalogue of Life. It is found in northern Việt Nam, where it may be called long cóc Schmid.
