= Dracontomelon costatum =

Conservation status
- Endangered (IUCN 3.1)

Scientific classification
- Kingdom: Plantae
- Clade: Tracheophytes
- Clade: Angiosperms
- Clade: Eudicots
- Clade: Rosids
- Order: Sapindales
- Family: Anacardiaceae
- Genus: Dracontomelon
- Species: D. costatum

Binomial name
- Dracontomelon costatum Blume

Species of tree

Dracontomelon costatum is a tree in the family Anacardiaceae. The specific epithet costatum means 'ribbed', referring to the leaf veins.

== Description ==
Dracontomelon costatum grows as a tree up to 30 metres (100 ft) tall with a trunk diameter of up to 65 cm (26 in). Its bark is cracking in appearance. The flowers are pale yellow. The ovoid to ellipsoid edible fruits ripen black and measure up to 2 cm (0.8 in) long.

== Distribution and habitat ==
Dracontomelon costatum is native to Sumatra and Borneo. Its habitat is lowland forests.

== Conservation ==
Dracontomelon costatum has been assessed as endangered on the IUCN Red List. It is threatened by logging for its timber and the conversion of its habitat for plantations, particularly for palm oil. The species' presence in a number of parks, including Gunung Leuser National Park and Kerinci Seblat National Park in Sumatra and Gunung Mulu National Park and Ulu Temburong National Park in Borneo, affords it a degree of protection.
