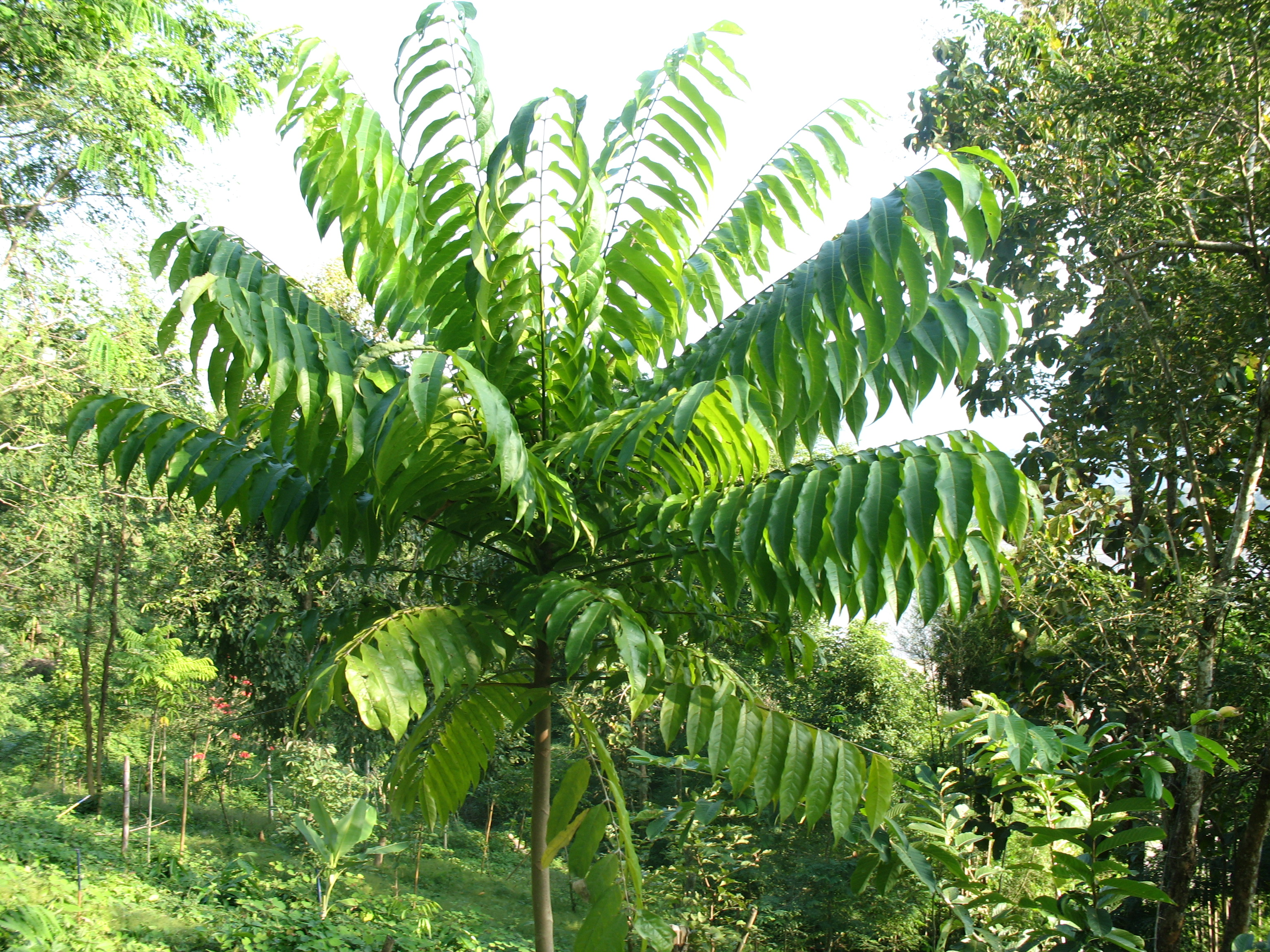
- Young crown

Conservation status
- Least Concern (IUCN 3.1)

Scientific classification
- Kingdom: Plantae
- Clade: Tracheophytes
- Clade: Angiosperms
- Clade: Eudicots
- Clade: Rosids
- Order: Sapindales
- Family: Anacardiaceae
- Genus: Dracontomelon
- Species: D. dao

Binomial name
- Dracontomelon dao (Blanco) Merr. & Rolfe

Synonyms
- List: Dracontomelon brachyphyllum Ridl.; Dracontomelon celebicum Koord.; Dracontomelon cumingianum Baill.; Dracontomelon edule Skeels; Dracontomelon lamiyo Merr.; Dracontomelon laxum Schum.; Dracontomelon mangiferum Blume; Dracontomelon puberulum Miq.; Dracontomelon sylvestre Bl.; Dracontomelon sylvestre Blume; Comeurya cumingiana Baill.; Paliurus dao Blanco; Paliurus edulis Blanco; Paliurus lamiyo Blanco; Pomum draconum Rumph.; Pomum draconum silvestre Rumph.; Poupartia mangifera Bl.

= Dracontomelon dao =

Species of flowering plant

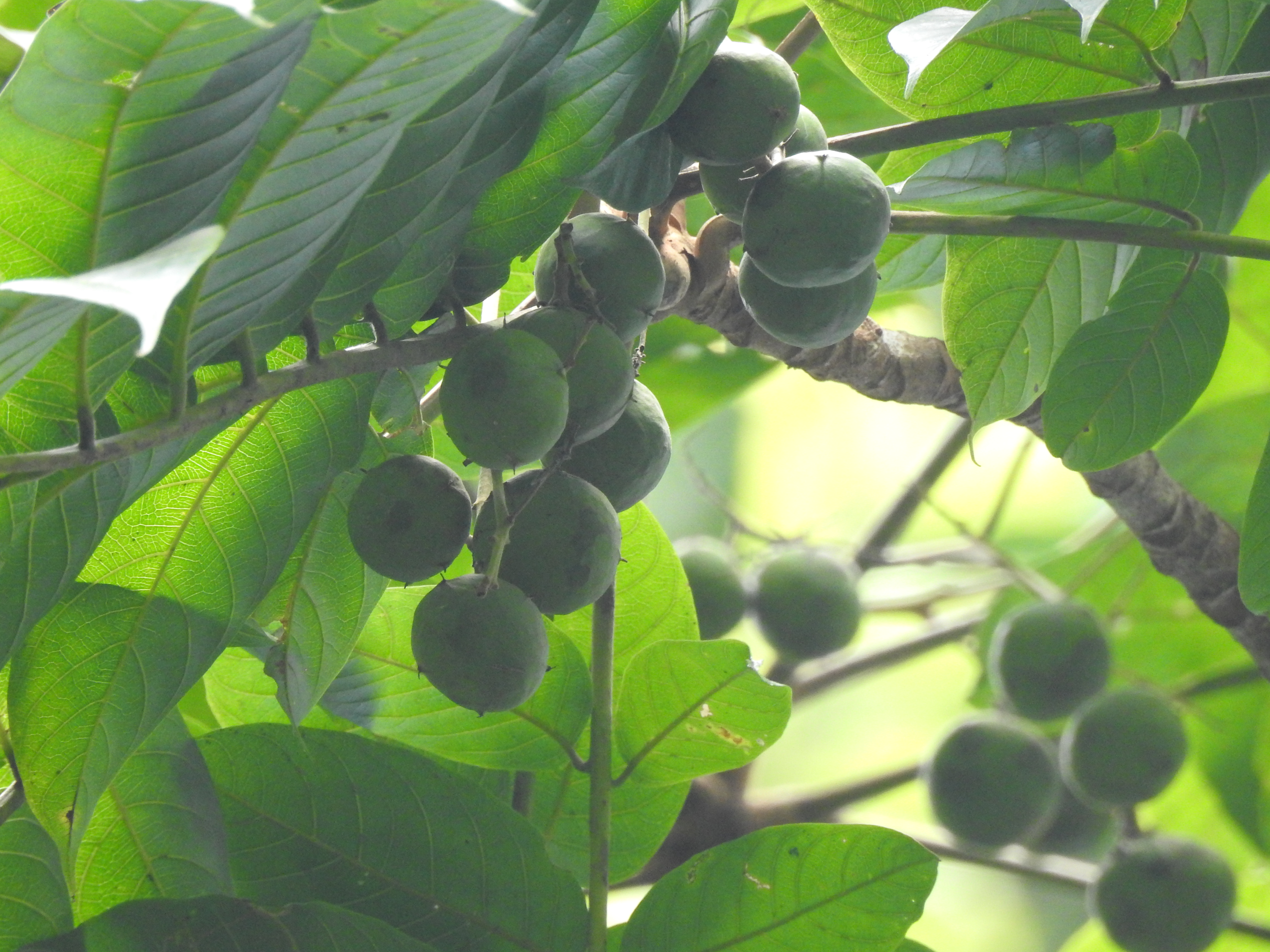

Dracontomelon dao, the Argus pheasant-tree, Pacific walnut, Papuan walnut, New Guinea walnut, paldao or simply dao, is a tree in the family Anacardiaceae, native to tropical Asia.

== Description ==
Dracontomelon dao grows as a tropical canopy tree distinguished mostly by its height (reaching up to about 37 metres or 121 feet), for its greyish-brown trunk which is branchless up to about 20 m (66 ft), and for its narrow buttresses which can reach up its trunk up to 6 m (20 ft) high. The species name is taken from the tree's name in Filipino.

== Distribution and habitat ==
Dracontomelon dao is found in the tropical forests of: peninsular Malaysia, Borneo, Sumatra, the Philippines, Java, the Lesser Sunda Islands, Sulawesi, the Maluku Islands, New Guinea, Solomon Islands, the south Andaman Islands, the Nicobar Islands, eastern India, Myanmar, Cambodia, Laos, Thailand and Vietnam. The species also occurs in southern China and Fiji.

== Uses ==
=== Culinary use ===
The fruit is an ingredient in some popular Vietnamese dishes, made into a syrup for mixing into cold drinks, and can be dried and preserved as a snack.

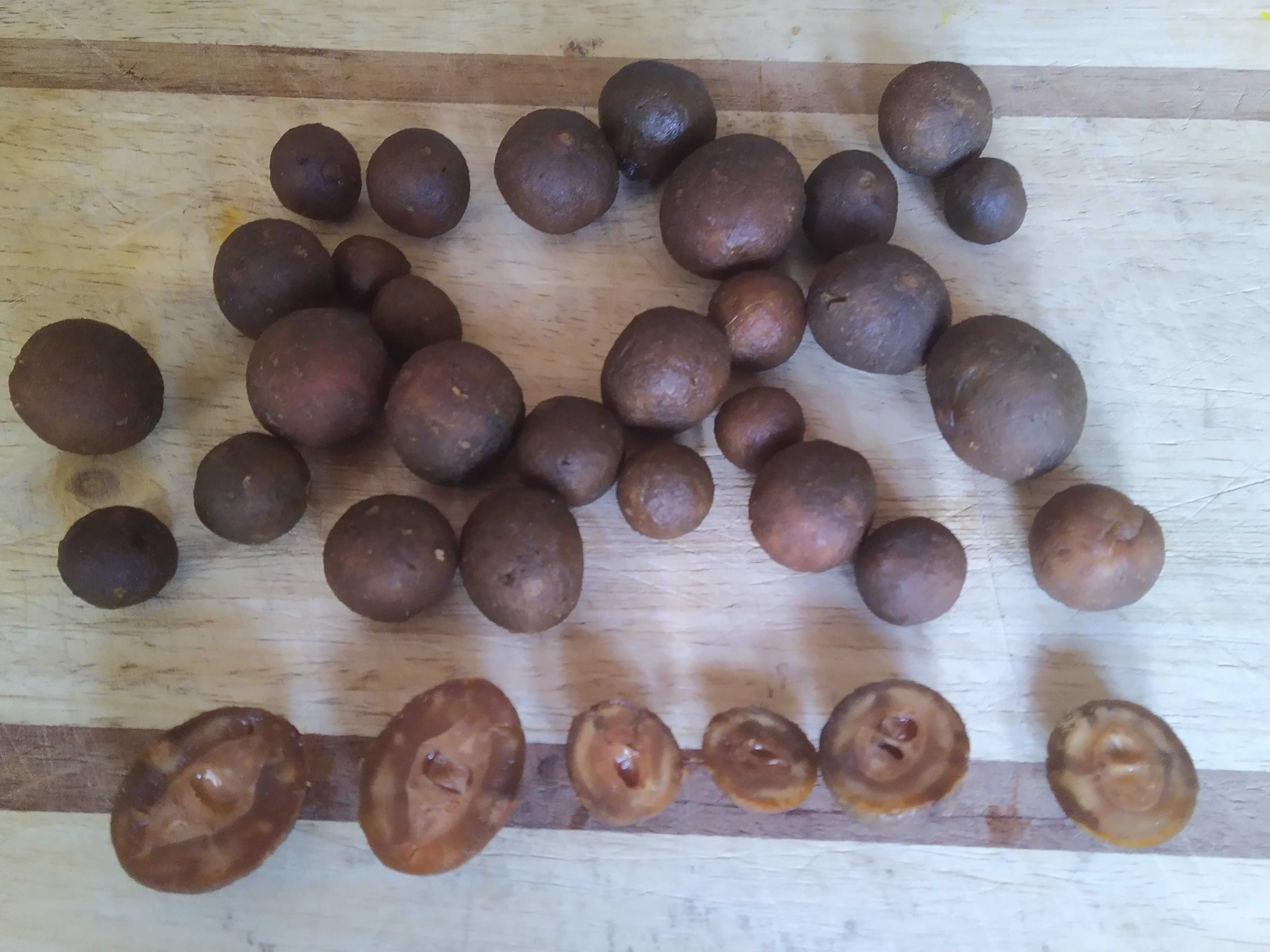
Preserved dracontomelum whole and halved

=== Medicinal uses ===
A decoction from the stem of the Lamyo is drunk by the Ayta people of Bataan as a treatment for wound infections.

The bark is used in the treatment of dysentery and in traditional medicine to provoke an abortion

The fruit is depurative. It is used in the treatment of dermatitis. The mature fruits are used in dentistry

=== Manuscript production ===
In Bali, the bark of the dao (book) is among several natural ingredients used to make a concoction for curing lontar leaves before they are bound to make writing material for manuscripts. The tree itself was among many plants identified in manuscripts of the Kakawin Ramayana (as rahu).

=== Use in decoration ===
The seed surface typically displays an intricate pattern with an approximate five-fold symmetry, and its five rhombic protrusions are reminiscent of primitive Buddha images. It is revered and called "Five Buddhas" in the North-East of Thailand and in Laos.

=== Veneer production ===
The wood is seldom seen as solid timber, but it is commercially available as veneer. The timber provides high chatoyance, with an average value above 21 PZC.

== In popular culture ==
=== Namesake localities ===
The municipality of Dao, Capiz and the Barangay (village) of Dau in Mabalacat, Pampanga are named after the dao tree.

=== UPLB's leaning Dao ===
A specific specimen of Dracontomelon dao has become an icon for students and a tourist attraction of sorts for the University of the Philippines Los Baños.

The tree inspired National Artist Leandro Locsin's design for the university's Student Union building, and for the buildings that now house UPLB's College of Agriculture and College of Development Communication - all three Locsin-designed buildings bearing a motif of repeating dao-like buttressed columns. The tree itself stood on the banks of Molawin Creek, on the site where the Student Union building was commissioned to be put up, so Locsin made the tree an element part of the building's layout, standing at the passenger drop-off point in front of the main entrance.

Some time before 2005, the dao gradually began to lean "20 degrees to the side with respect to its vertical position due to its heavy crown and weakened root system", leading then-Chancellor Wilfredo P. David to order that it be cut down in 2005. With testimony from some of UPLB's plant pathologists and urban forestry experts, and support from the Philippines' National Commission on Culture and the Arts and Department of Environment and Natural Resources, protesters managed to prevent the tree from being cut until David's term ended, after which the next chancellor, Luis Rey I. Velasco, decided not to cut it, and instead declared it one of the university's twelve "Centennial Heritage Trees". When Typhoon Milenyo battered Los Baños and caused numerous trees in UPLB to fall down, the leaning Dao remained standing, turning the leaning dao into a legend of sorts; every time a strong typhoon comes along, UPLB constituents eagerly go to see if the dao is still standing, and anticipate another headline that says "UP Los Baños' leaning dao tree survives (name of typhoon)".
