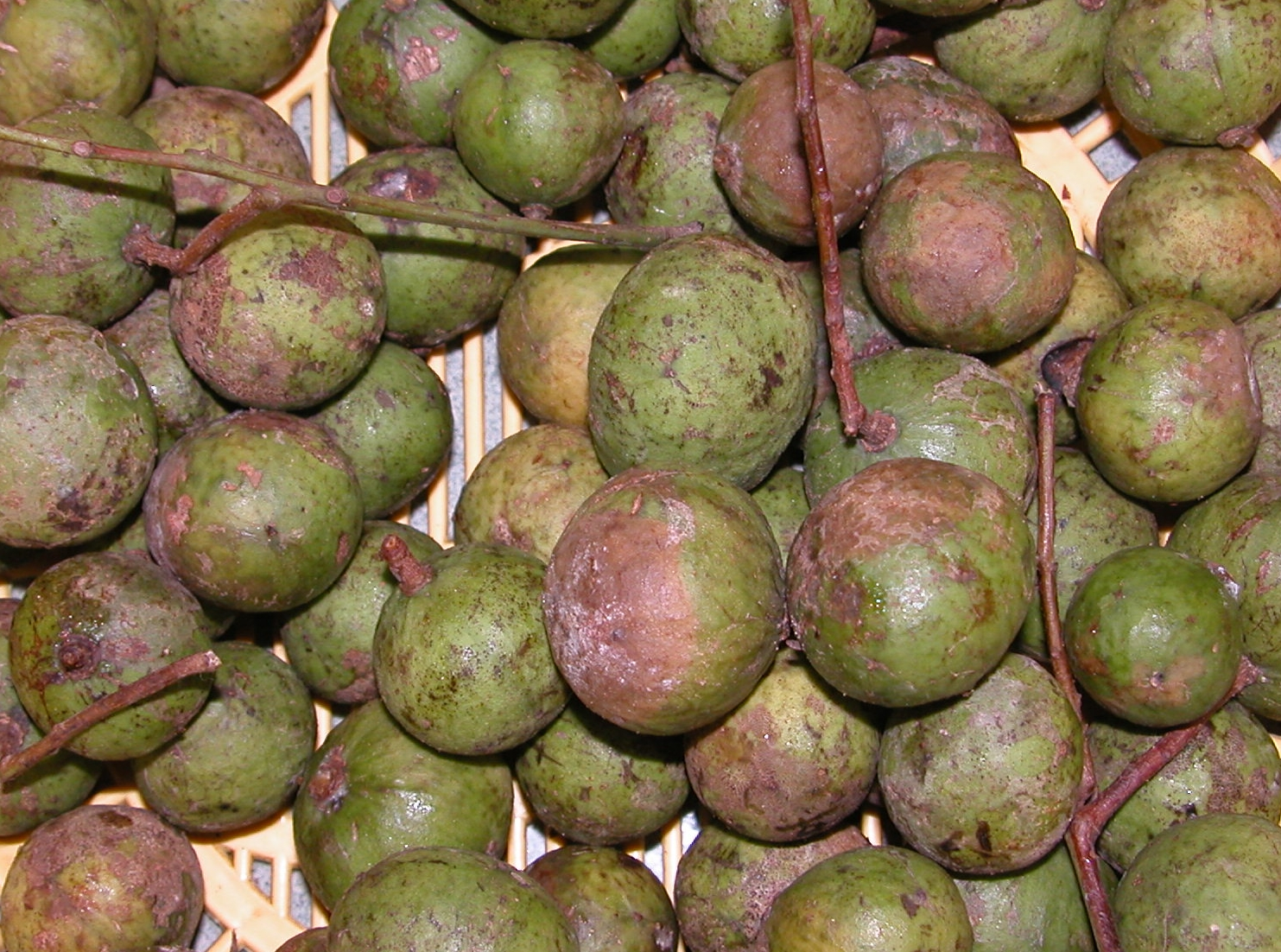
- Fruits of Dracontomelon duperreanum

Scientific classification
- Kingdom: Plantae
- Clade: Tracheophytes
- Clade: Angiosperms
- Clade: Eudicots
- Clade: Rosids
- Order: Sapindales
- Family: Anacardiaceae
- Genus: Dracontomelon
- Species: D. duperreanum

Binomial name
- Dracontomelon duperreanum Pierre

Synonyms
- Dracontomelon sinense Stapf

= Dracontomelon duperreanum =

Species of tree

Dracontomelon duperreanum or Indochina Dragonplum is a tree species Anacardiaceae, with no subspecies listed in the Catalogue of Life.

It is found in southern China (Yunnan, Guangxi, Guangdong) and Vietnam (especially in the north - centre); its name in Vietnamese is long cóc, sấu trắng or simply sấu.

== Uses ==
The fruits of the Indochina Dragonplum tree are used in Vietnamese cuisine, often preserved with souring agents or cooked with duck. After being preserved in sugar, it can be used to make a cooling drink in summer.

== Exportation ==
On August 3, 2021, Vietnam exported 22 tons of the fruit to Australia.

== Gallery ==
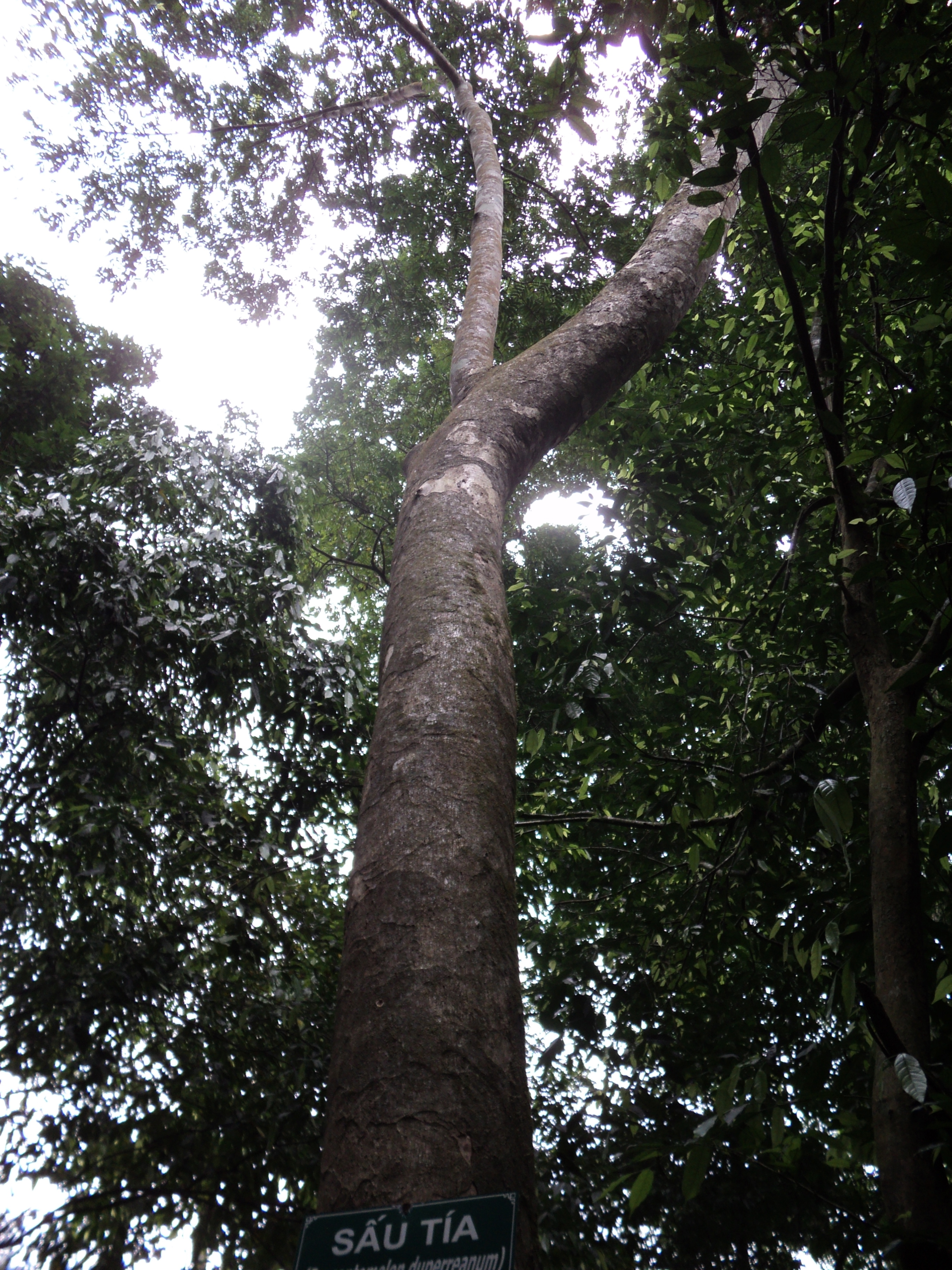
Sấu in Phong Nha-Kẻ Bàng National Park.

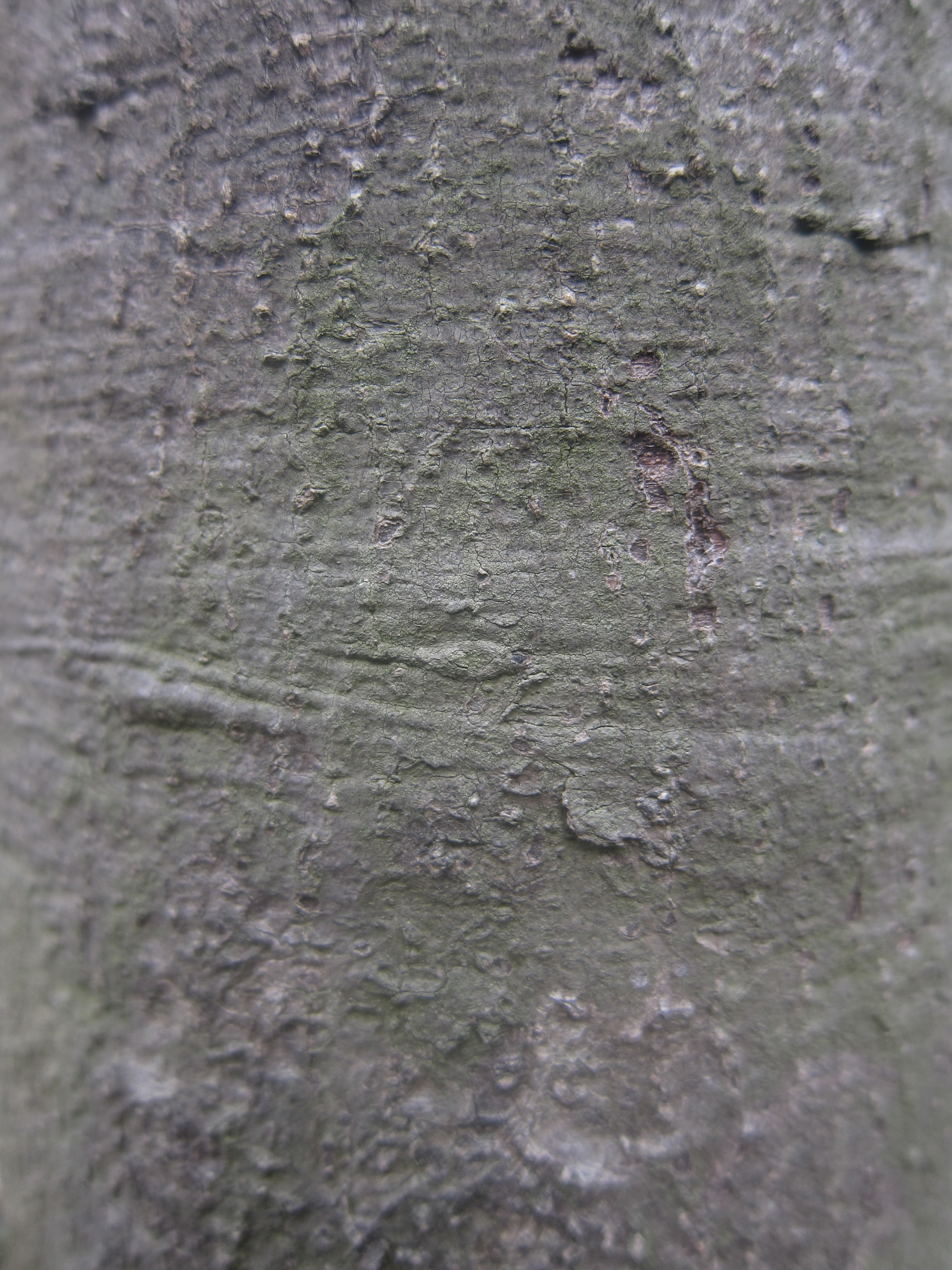
Bark of young D. duperreanum

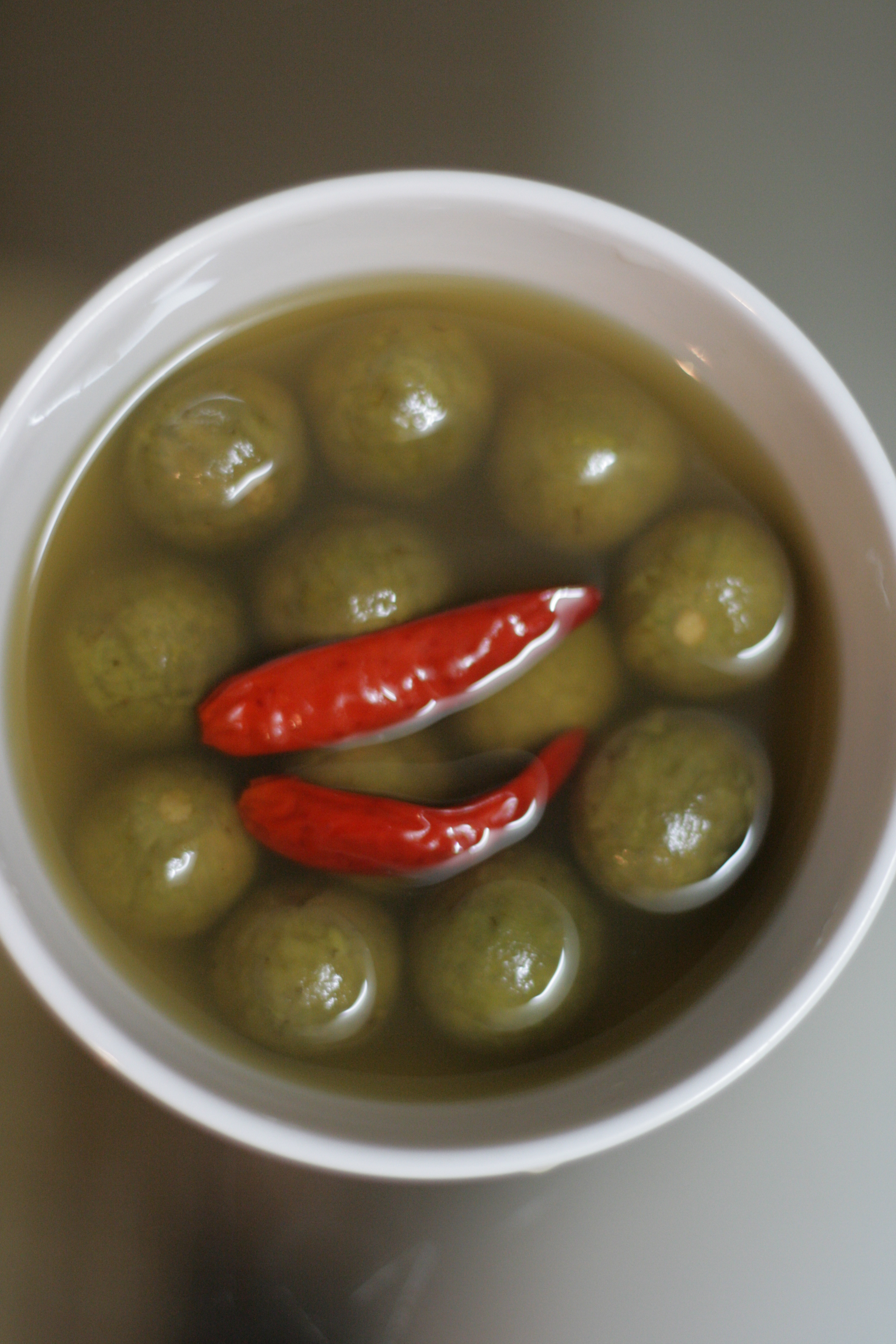
Sấu ngâm mắm

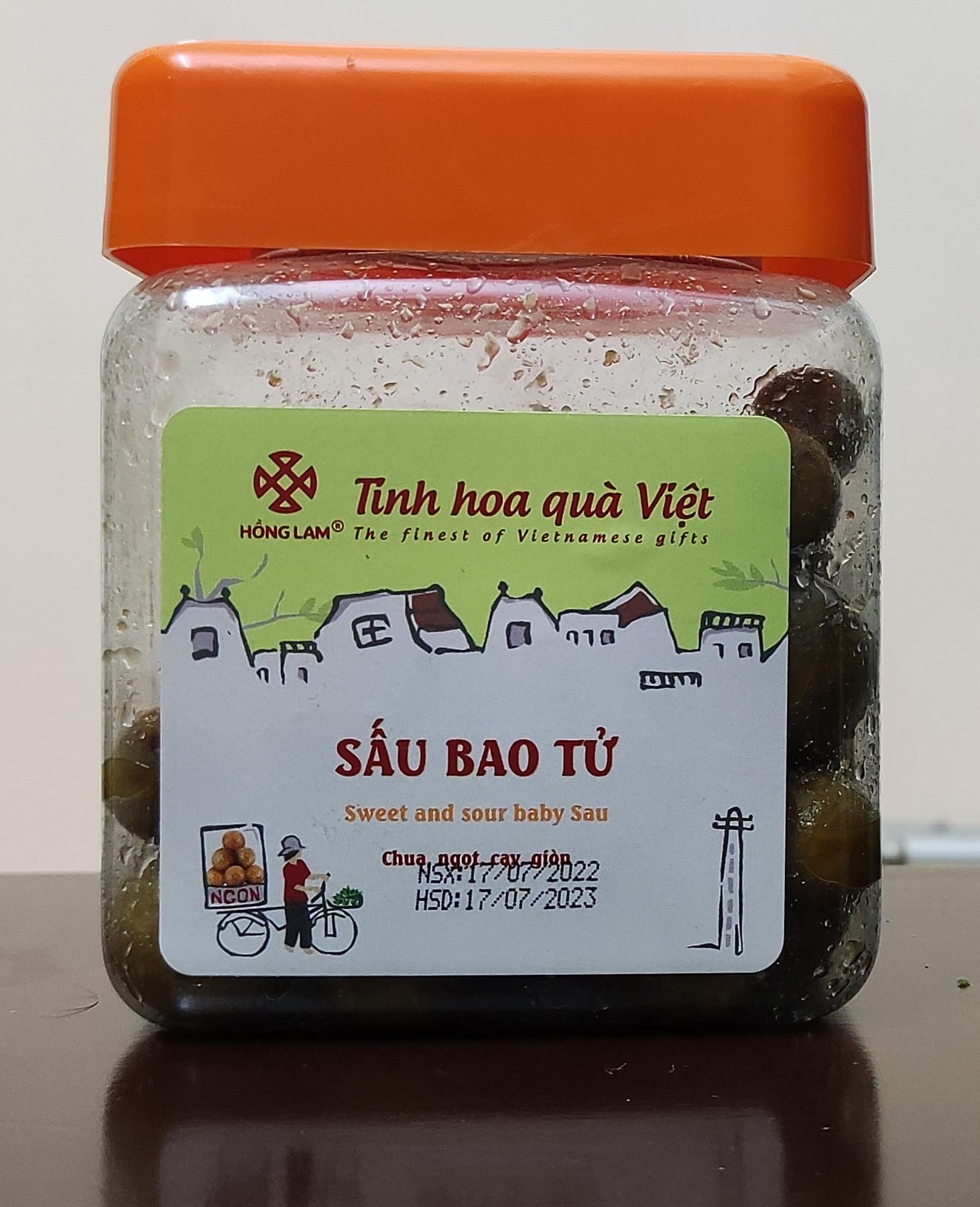
Candied fruits
