= François Poupart =

French scientist

François Poupart (1661–1709) French physician, anatomist and entomologist.

He described Poupart's ligament, which had been discovered by Gabriele Falloppio.

In 1789, botanists published Poupartia a genus of plants from Islands in the Indian Ocean in family Anacardiaceae. It was named in Poupart's honour.

Then in 2006, botanists published Poupartiopsis. a genus of flowering plants from Madagascar, belonging to the family Anacardiaceae and also named in Francois honour.
