= Mauria killipii =

Conservation status
- Vulnerable (IUCN 2.3)

Scientific classification
- Kingdom: Plantae
- Clade: Tracheophytes
- Clade: Angiosperms
- Clade: Eudicots
- Clade: Rosids
- Order: Sapindales
- Family: Anacardiaceae
- Genus: Mauria
- Species: M. killipii

Binomial name
- Mauria killipii F.Barkley

Species of tree

Mauria killipii is a species of plant in the family Anacardiaceae. It is endemic to Peru.
