= Tumultivenia =

Scientific classification
- Kingdom: Plantae
- Clade: Tracheophytes
- Clade: Angiosperms
- Clade: Eudicots
- Clade: Rosids
- Order: Sapindales
- Family: Anacardiaceae
- Genus: Tumultivenia; J.D.Mitch. & Daly
- Species: T. caatingae

Binomial name
- Tumultivenia caatingae (J.D.Mitch. & Daly) J.D.Mitch. & Daly

Synonyms
- Cyrtocarpa caatingae J.D.Mitch. & Daly (1991) (basionym)

Genus of flowering plants

Tumultivenia is a genus of flowering plants in the family Anacardiaceae. It includes a single species, Tumultivenia caatingae, a tree native to dry regions of central Brazil, including the Caatinga thorn scrub.
