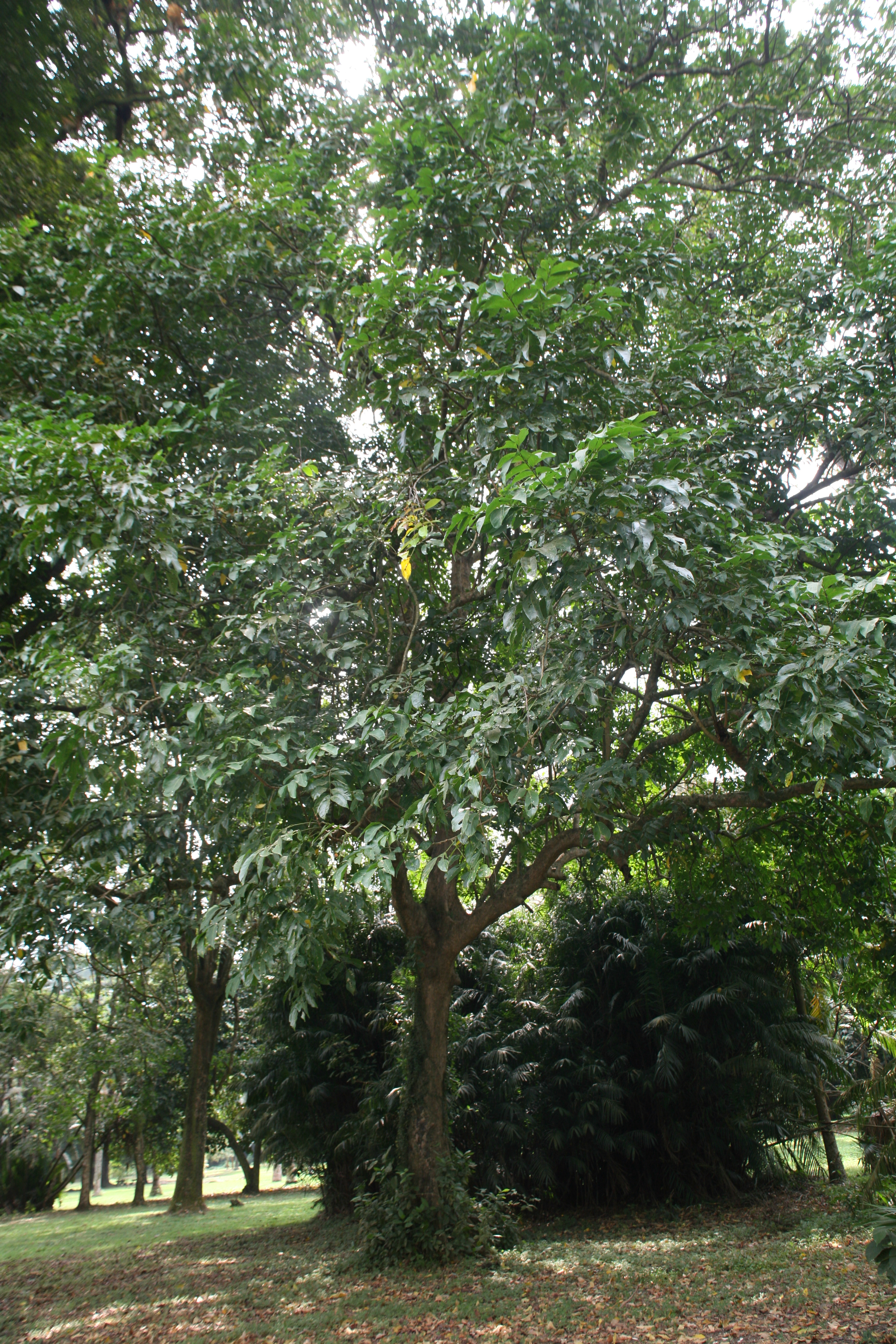
- Pseudospondias microcarpa

Scientific classification
- Kingdom: Plantae
- Clade: Tracheophytes
- Clade: Angiosperms
- Clade: Eudicots
- Clade: Rosids
- Order: Sapindales
- Family: Anacardiaceae
- Subfamily: Spondiadoideae
- Genus: Pseudospondias; Engl.

Species
- See text

= Pseudospondias =

Family of shrubs

Pseudospondias is a genus of plants in the subfamily Spondiadoideae of the cashew and sumac family Anacardiaceae. They grow as dioecious shrubs or trees and are found in forests of Sub-Saharan Africa.

== Species ==
The Plant List and Catalogue of Life recognise about 2 accepted species:

- Pseudospondias longifolia Engl.
- Pseudospondias microcarpa (A.Rich.) Engl.
