= Solenocarpus indicus =

Scientific classification
- Kingdom: Plantae
- Clade: Tracheophytes
- Clade: Angiosperms
- Clade: Eudicots
- Clade: Rosids
- Order: Sapindales
- Family: Anacardiaceae
- Genus: Solenocarpus
- Species: S. indicus

Binomial name
- Solenocarpus indicus Wight & Arn.

Synonyms
- Spondias indica (Wight & Arn.) Airy Shaw & Forman

Genus of plants

Solenocarpus indicus is a tree in the family Anacardiaceae, commonly known as Indian hog plum.

== Description ==
The bark is smooth and greyish-green; the branchlets are glabrous with corky bark. The leaves are compound, imparipinnate, and clustered at the ends of twigs. The leaflets are opposite, in 3–7 pairs with a terminal one. The inflorescence is a terminal panicle bearing bisexual, white, and fragrant flowers. The fruit is a small, oblong one-seeded drupe.

== Phenology ==
Solenocarpus indicus flowers and fruits in January–March.
