= Allospondias =

Scientific classification
- Kingdom: Plantae
- Clade: Tracheophytes
- Clade: Angiosperms
- Clade: Eudicots
- Clade: Rosids
- Order: Sapindales
- Family: Anacardiaceae
- Genus: Allospondias (Pierre) Stapf

Genus of flowering plants

Allospondias is a genus of flowering plants belonging to the family Anacardiaceae.

Its native range is Southern China to Malaysian Peninsula.

Species:

- Allospondias lakonensis (Pierre) Stapf
- Allospondias laxiflora (Kurz) Lace
