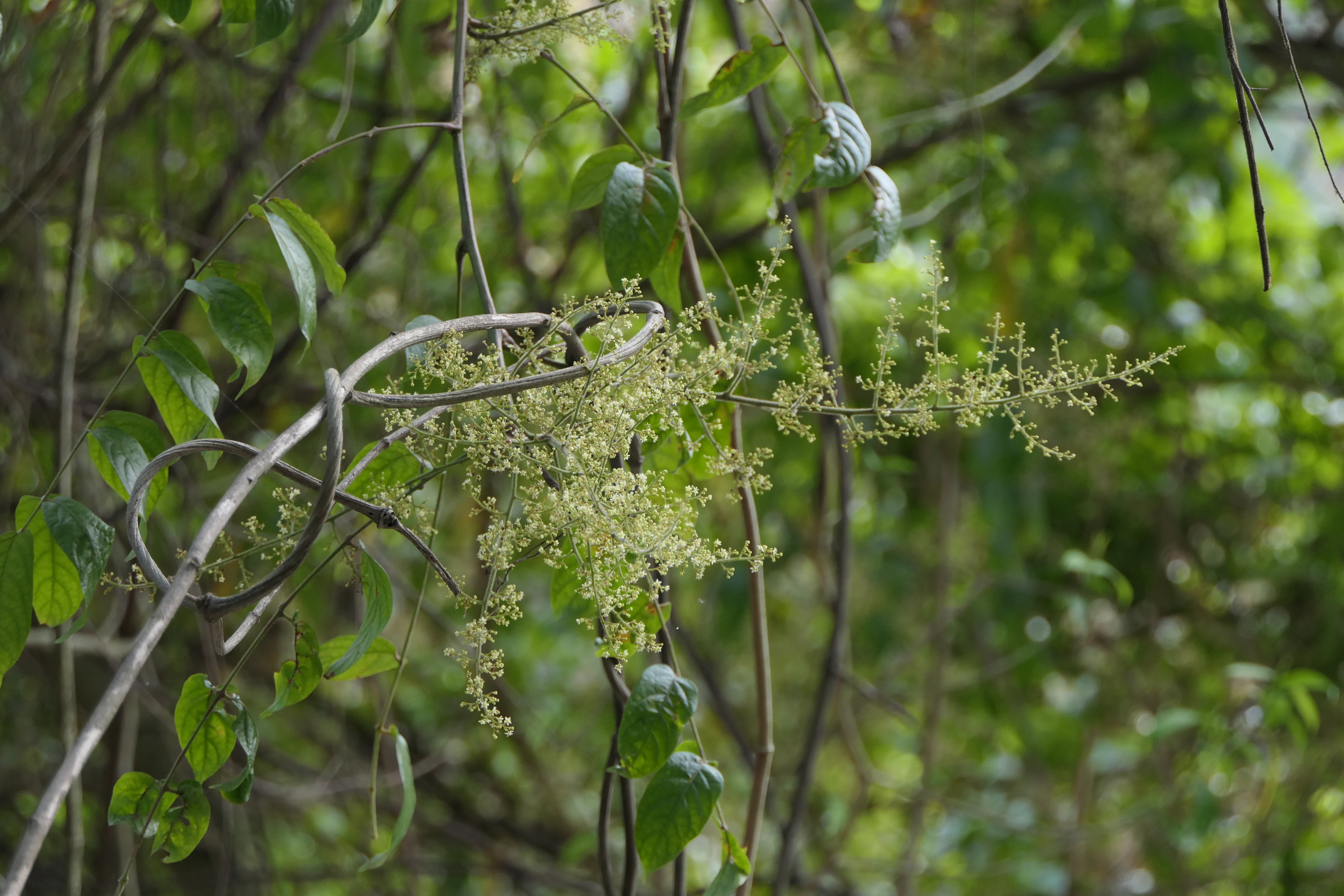
- Pegia nitida

Scientific classification
- Kingdom: Plantae
- Clade: Tracheophytes
- Clade: Angiosperms
- Clade: Eudicots
- Clade: Rosids
- Order: Sapindales
- Family: Anacardiaceae
- Subfamily: Spondiadoideae
- Genus: Pegia; Colebr.

Species
- See text

Synonyms
- Phlebochiton Wall.

= Pegia =

Genus of flowering plants

Pegia is a genus of plants in the subfamily Spondiadoideae of the cashew and sumac family Anacardiaceae.

== Description ==
Pegia species grow as shrubs, sarmentose trees or lianas. They are polygamous, woody climbers. The ovoid or oblong fruits have a red or purple skin with a red mesocarp. Pegia species grow naturally in tropical Asia.

== Species ==
The Plant List and Flora of China recognise about 2 accepted species:

- Pegia nitida Colebr.
- Pegia sarmentosa (Lecomte) Hand.-Mazz.
