= Attilaea =

Conservation status
- Endangered (IUCN 3.1)

Scientific classification
- Kingdom: Plantae
- Clade: Tracheophytes
- Clade: Angiosperms
- Clade: Eudicots
- Clade: Rosids
- Order: Sapindales
- Family: Anacardiaceae
- Genus: Attilaea; E.Martínez & Ramos (2007)
- Species: A. abalak

Binomial name
- Attilaea abalak E.Martínez & Ramos (2007)

Genus of flowering plants

Attilaea abalak is a species of flowering plant belonging to the family Anacardiaceae. It is a shrub or small tree native to Guatemala and southeastern Mexico. It is the sole species in the monotypic genus Attilaea.

Attilaea abalak is a shrub, liana, or small tree, growing up to 12 (–15) meters long with a trunk 4–5 (–10) cm in diameter. It is native to dry and moist lowland forest on the Yucatán Peninsula of Mexico (Campeche, Yucatán, and Quintana Roo) and northern Belize and Guatemala, from sea level to 200 meters elevation. It grows only on outcrops of gypsum and limestone. The species has a small range and population, and is threatened with habitat loss from quarrying of limestone and gypsum, and from increasingly frequent fires.
