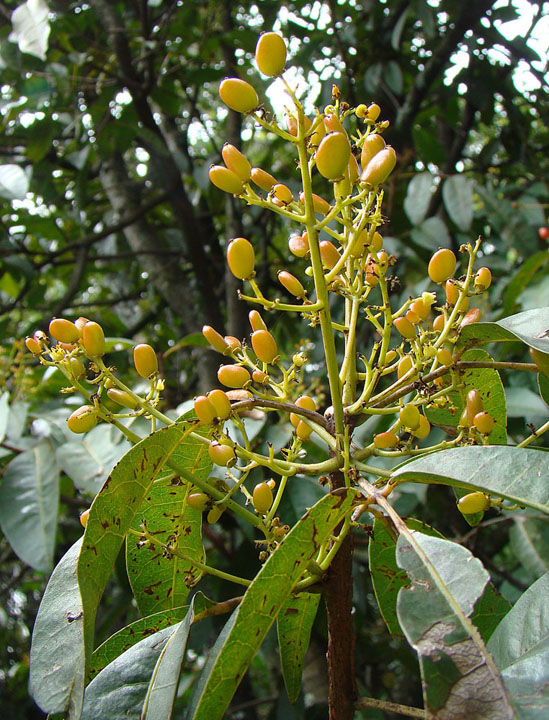
- Mauria heterophylla

Scientific classification
- Kingdom: Plantae
- Clade: Tracheophytes
- Clade: Angiosperms
- Clade: Eudicots
- Clade: Rosids
- Order: Sapindales
- Family: Anacardiaceae
- Subfamily: Anacardioideae
- Genus: Mauria; Kunth

= Mauria =

Genus of flowering plants

Mauria is a genus of plants in the family Anacardiaceae.

== Taxonomy ==
=== Species ===
As of July 2020, Plants of the World online has 15 accepted species:

- Mauria boliviana Herzog
- Mauria cuatrecasasii F.A.Barkley
- Mauria denticulata J.F.Macbr.
- Mauria ferruginea Tul.
- Mauria heterophylla Kunth
- Mauria killipii F.Barkley
- Mauria kunthii Renteria
- Mauria membranifolia Barfod & Holm-Niels.
- Mauria obtusifolia (Engl.) F.A.Barkley
- Mauria peruviana Cuatrec.
- Mauria sericea Loes.
- Mauria simplicifolia Kunth
- Mauria subserrata Loes.
- Mauria thaumatophylla Loes.
- Mauria trichothyrsa Loes.
