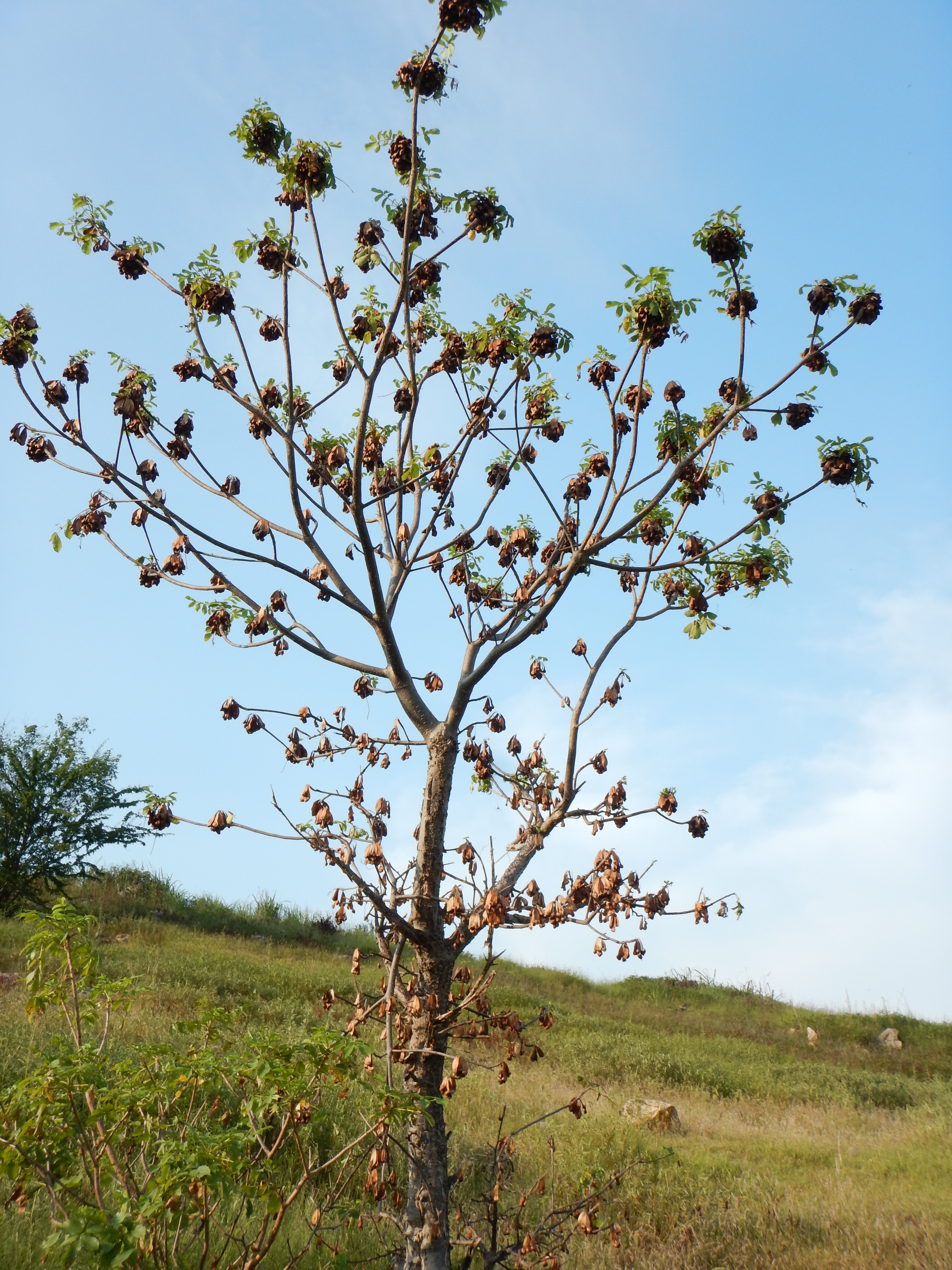
- Amphipterygium adstringens

Scientific classification
- Kingdom: Plantae
- Clade: Tracheophytes
- Clade: Angiosperms
- Clade: Eudicots
- Clade: Rosids
- Order: Sapindales
- Family: Anacardiaceae
- Subfamily: Anacardioideae
- Genus: Amphipterygium; Schiede ex Standl.

Species
- See text

Synonyms
- Hypopterygium Schltdl.; Juliania Schltdl.

= Amphipterygium =

Genus of flowering plants

Amphipterygium is a small genus in the subfamily Anacardioideae of the cashew and sumac family Anacardiaceae.

== Species ==
The Plant List and Catalogue of Life recognise 5 accepted species:

- Amphipterygium adstringens (Schltdl.) Standl.
- Amphipterygium amplifolium (Hemsl. & Rose) Hemsl. & Rose ex Standl.
- Amphipterygium glaucum (Hemsl. & Rose) Hemsl. & Rose ex Standl.
- Amphipterygium molle (Hemsl.) Hemsl. & Rose ex Standl.
- Amphipterygium simplicifolium (Standl.) Cuev.-Fig.
