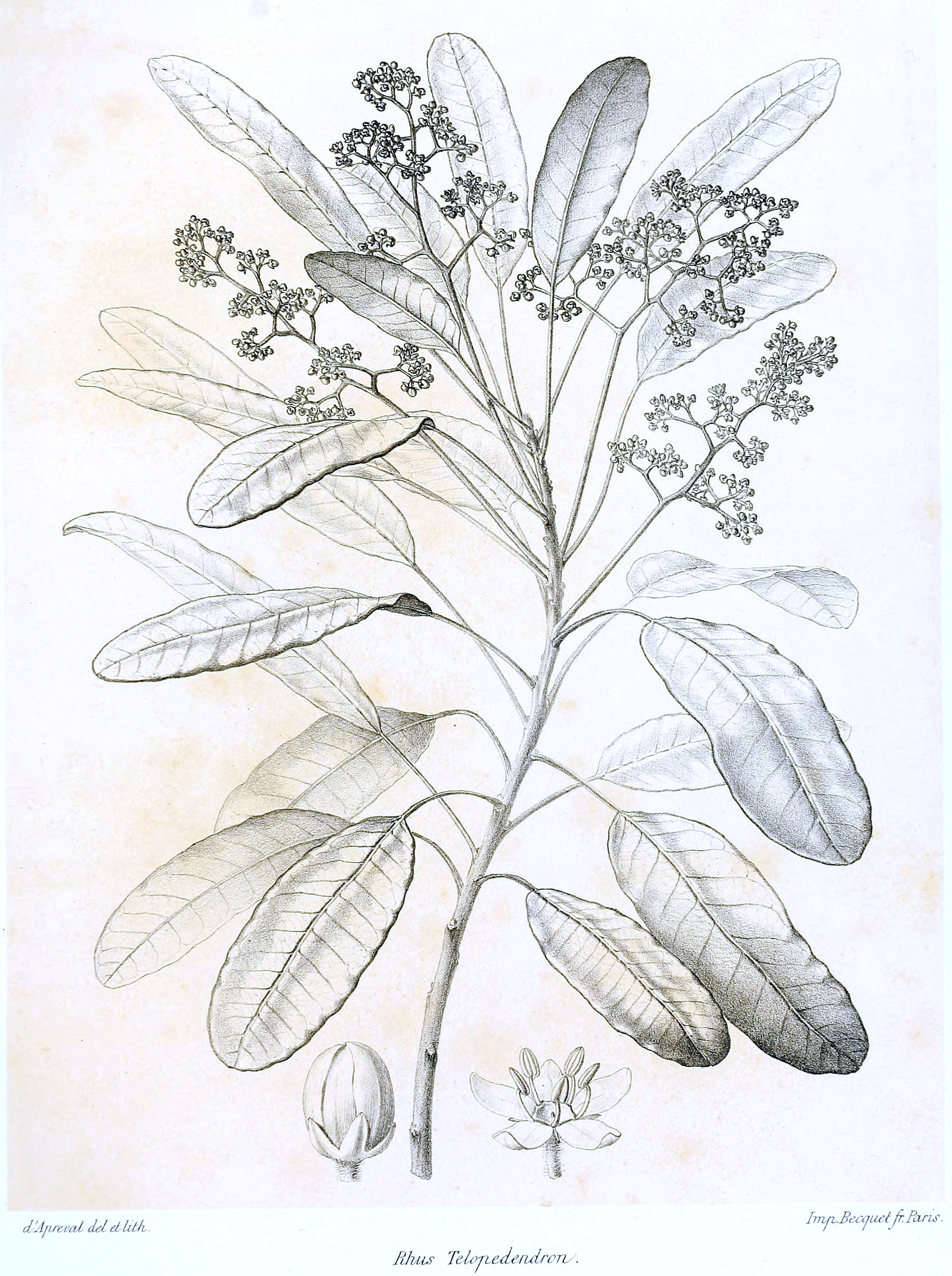

Scientific classification
- Kingdom: Plantae
- Clade: Tracheophytes
- Clade: Angiosperms
- Clade: Eudicots
- Clade: Rosids
- Order: Sapindales
- Family: Anacardiaceae
- Genus: Baronia; Baker (1882)
- Species: B. taratana

Binomial name
- Baronia taratana Baker (1882)

Synonyms
- Micronychia humbertii H.Perrier (1946); Rhus taratana (Baker) H.Perrier (1944); Rhus telopedendron Baill. (1892)

= Baronia taratana =

Species of plant

Baronia taratana is a species of flowering plant in the cashew family, Anacardiaceae. It is a tree endemic to Madagascar. It is the sole species in genus Baronia.
