= Uniostium =

Scientific classification
- Kingdom: Plantae
- Clade: Tracheophytes
- Clade: Angiosperms
- Clade: Eudicots
- Clade: Rosids
- Order: Sapindales
- Family: Anacardiaceae
- Genus: Uniostium; J.D.Mitch. & Daly
- Species: U. velutinifolium

Binomial name
- Uniostium velutinifolium (R.S.Cowan) J.D.Mitch. & Daly

Synonyms
- Bursera velutinifolia R.S.Cowan (1952) (basionym); Cyrtocarpa velutinifolia (R.S.Cowan) J.D.Mitch. & Daly; Loxopterygium gutierrezii F.A.Barkley; Tapirira velutinifolia (R.S.Cowan) Marc.-Berti

Genus of flowering plants

Uniostium is a genus of flowering plants in the family Anacardiaceae. It includes a single species, Uniostium velutinifolium, a tree native to tropical South America, ranging from Curaçao to Venezuela, northeastern Colombia, Guyana, and Roraima state of northern Brazil.
