= Poupartiopsis =

Conservation status
- Vulnerable (IUCN 3.1)

Scientific classification
- Kingdom: Plantae
- Clade: Tracheophytes
- Clade: Angiosperms
- Clade: Eudicots
- Clade: Rosids
- Order: Sapindales
- Family: Anacardiaceae
- Genus: Poupartiopsis; Capuron ex J.D.Mitch. & Daly
- Species: P. spondiocarpus

Binomial name
- Poupartiopsis spondiocarpus Capuron ex J.D.Mitch. & Daly

Species of flowering plant

Poupartiopsis is a monotypic genus of flowering plants belonging to the family Anacardiaceae. The only species is Poupartiopsis spondiocarpus.

== Description ==
It is a modest-sized forest tree.

== Range and habitat ==
Poupartiopsis spondiocarpus is native to Madagascar. It is found in sandy coastal forests along Madagascar's east coast.

== Name ==
The genus name of Poupartiopsis is in honour of François Poupart (d. 1708), a French physician, anatomist and entomologist. The Latin specific epithet of spondiocarpus refers to the similarity of the internal structure of its fruit to that of the genus Spondias Both the genus and the species were first described and published in Syst. Bot. Vol.31 on page 338 in 2006.
