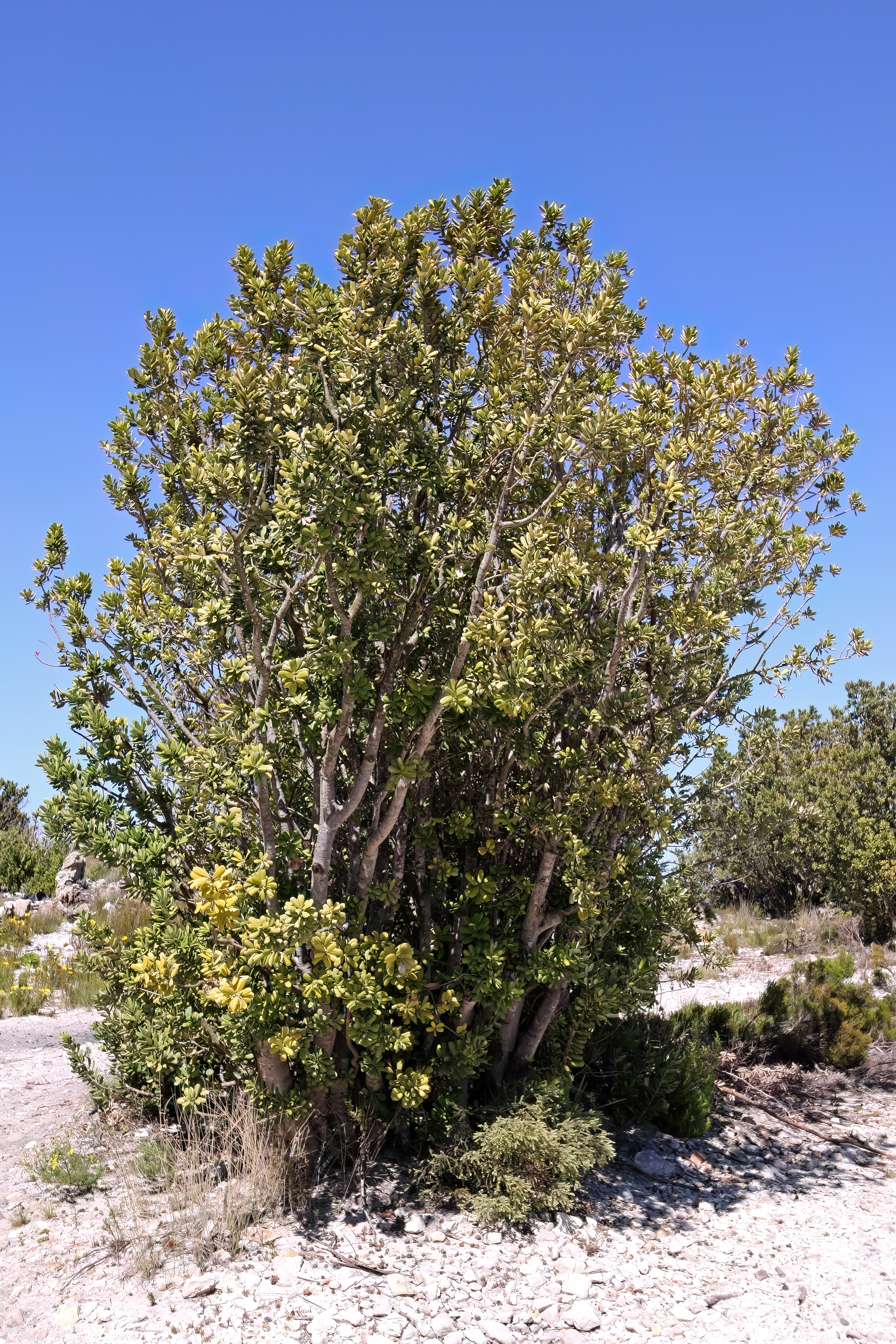
- In Western Cape, South Africa

Conservation status
- Least Concern (IUCN 3.1)

Scientific classification
- Kingdom: Plantae
- Clade: Tracheophytes
- Clade: Angiosperms
- Clade: Eudicots
- Clade: Rosids
- Order: Sapindales
- Family: Anacardiaceae
- Subfamily: Anacardioideae
- Genus: Heeria; Meisn.
- Species: H. argentea

Binomial name
- Heeria argentea (Thunb.) Meisn.

Synonyms
- Genus: Anaphrenium E.Mey. ex Endl.; Roemeria Thunb.; Species: Anaphrenium argenteum (Thunb.) E.Mey.; Rhus argentea (Thunb.) Druce; Rhus thunbergii Hook.; Roemeria argentea (Thunb.) Thunb.; Bumelia argentea (Thunb.) Roem. & Schult.; Sideroxylon argenteum Thunb.; Rhus argyrophylla C.Presl

= Heeria argentea =

Species of plant

Heeria is a monotypic genus of flowering plants belonging to the family Anacardiaceae. The only species is Heeria argentea.

It is native to the Cape Provinces of South Africa. The genus name of Heeria is in honour of Oswald Heer (1809–1883), a Swiss geologist and naturalist. The Latin specific epithet of argentea refers to silvery. Heeria argentea was first described and published in Pl. Vasc. Gen. Vol.2 on page 55 in 1837.

Fruits of Heeria argentea are dispersed by Micaelamys namaquensis, the Namaqua rock rat, to rock outcrops where the seeds germinate and enjoy relative protection from fire.
