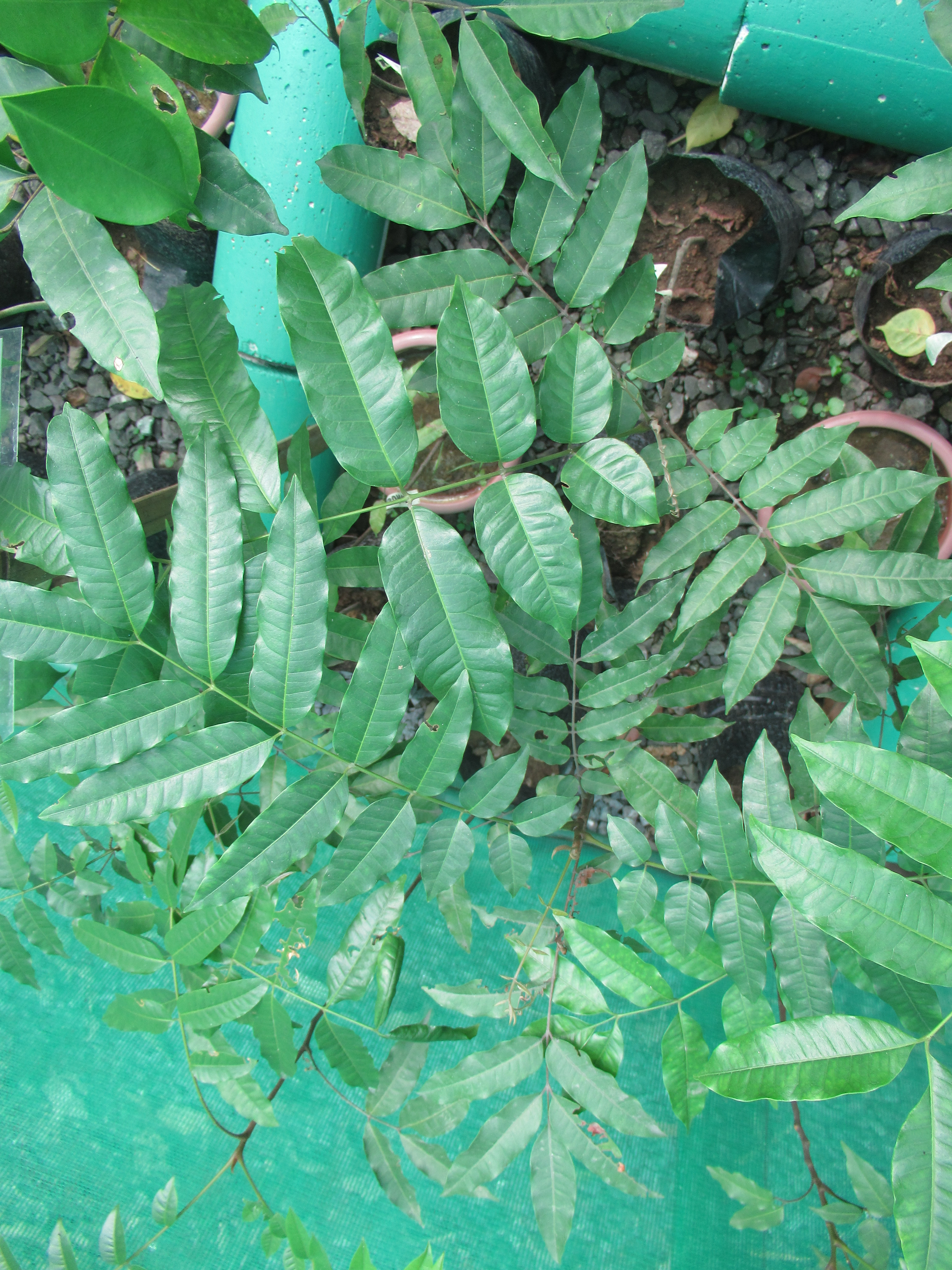

Conservation status
- Vulnerable (IUCN 3.1)

Scientific classification
- Kingdom: Plantae
- Clade: Embryophytes
- Clade: Tracheophytes
- Clade: Spermatophytes
- Clade: Angiosperms
- Clade: Eudicots
- Clade: Rosids
- Order: Sapindales
- Family: Anacardiaceae
- Subfamily: Spondiadoideae
- Genus: Koordersiodendron; Engl. ex Koord.
- Species: K. pinnatum

Binomial name
- Koordersiodendron pinnatum (Blanco) Merr.

Synonyms
- Kokkia Zipp. ex Blume (1850), not validly publ.; Koordersina Kuntze (1903), nom. superfl.; Calesiam speciosum Kuntze (1891); Cyrtocarpa quinquestila Blanco (1845); Helicteres pinnata Blanco (1837); Kokkia speciosa Zipp. ex Blume (1850), not validly publ.; Koordersiodendron celebicum Engl. (1898); Koordersiodendron papuanum Kaneh. & Hatus. (1942); Odina speciosa Blume (1850)

= Koordersiodendron =

Genus of plants

Koordersiodendron is a monotypic genus of flowering plants belonging to the family Anacardiaceae. It only contains one known species, Koordersiodendron pinnatum.

Its native range is Malesia to New Guinea. It is found in the countries of Borneo, Maluku Islands, New Guinea, Philippines and Sulawesi.

The genus name of Koordersiodendron is in honour of Sijfert Hendrik Koorders (1863–1919), Dutch-Indonesian botanist and mycologist in Bogor, and herbarium director beginning in 1903. It has the following synonyms; Kokkia Zipp. ex Blume and Koordersina Kuntze. The Latin specific epithet of the species, pinnatum is derived from pinnatus meaning feathered. The genus was first described and published in Meded. Lands Plantentuin Vol.19 on page 410 in 1898, and the species was first described and published in Bull. Bur. Forest. Philipp. Islands Vol.1 on page 33 in 1903.
