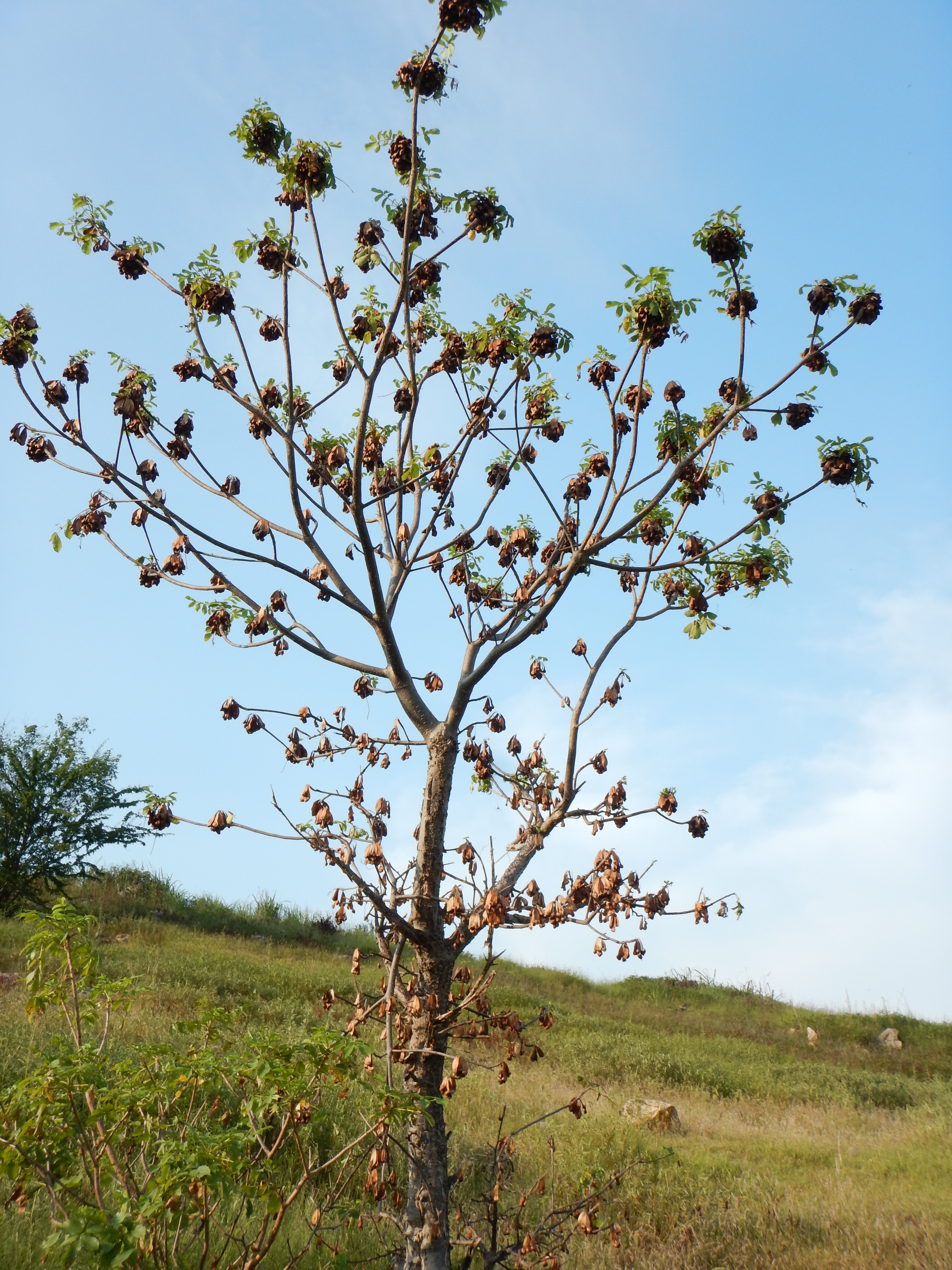

Scientific classification
- Kingdom: Plantae
- Clade: Embryophytes
- Clade: Tracheophytes
- Clade: Angiosperms
- Clade: Eudicots
- Clade: Rosids
- Order: Sapindales
- Family: Anacardiaceae
- Genus: Amphipterygium
- Species: A. adstringens

Binomial name
- Amphipterygium adstringens Diederich Franz Leonhard von Schlechtendal

= Amphipterygium adstringens =

Species of flowering plant

Amphipterygium adstringens, or the cuachalalate, is an ancient medicinal plant that has been commercially used in Mexico for centuries. Because of its ever-growing popularity and since the most sought after part of the plant is its bark, the cuachalalate was as of 2004 considered an endangered species. The Amphipterygium adstringens tree's height ranges from 4–8.5 m high. The distinguishing factor of this tree is its bark. Its bark is wrinkled, grayish in color and verrucose, with corky protuberances. Its branches are usually covered with scars of fallen leaves and may be bare or covered with fine hair-like structures. Its leave arrangements is imparipinnate with petioles that average 5.4 cm in length. It usually has 3-7 leaflets leaf. These leaflets have a cuneate base and an obtuse or rounded apex, its margin is dentate or crenate. A. adstringens can be differentiated from the other members of the Amphipterygium genus by the shape of its terminal leaflets, which is spathulate, and has dentate margins on the distal half of the leaflet.

== Distribution ==
Amphypterygium adstringens is distributed in central and southern Mexico in deciduous forests, near the mountain and pacific slope regions, in the southern center part of the State of Jalisco, Michoacán, Morelos, Estado de Mexico, Puebla, Guerrero and Oaxaca. This plant usually blooms in the summer, from June to August, and tends to fruit from August to January.

== Habitat and ecology ==
Amphipterygium adstringens grows in hot temperatures in deciduous jungles or Quercus and Ilex forests.

== Flowers and fruit ==
The male inflorescence is about 8.6 cm long. The male flower is actinomorphic. Its floral peduncle averages at .95 cm in length. There are 6-8 sepals on the flower all ranging from 1.2mm-2mm, these are tomentose (covered densely with hair at youngness), but at maturity they are pilose (the hair elongates and softens forming a plush surface). The stamen is short, with a filament averaging at only .28mm in length. The anthers, like the mature sepals, are also covered with long, fine hairs.The female inflorescence is in raceme about 1.3 cm in length. These generally contain 2-4 flowers. The pistils are bifurcate. The style is cylindrical and about 2–3 mm long.Amphipterygium adstringens is dioecious, with male and female flowers on separate individuals.

=== Medicinal ===
Cuachalalate is a legendary plant in Mexico believed to have curative effects. The most sought after part of the plant is its bark. This bark is believed to cure malaria, stomach cancer, gastric ulcers and kidney sicknesses. Many people in Mexico also use the Cuachalalate to harden their gums.
