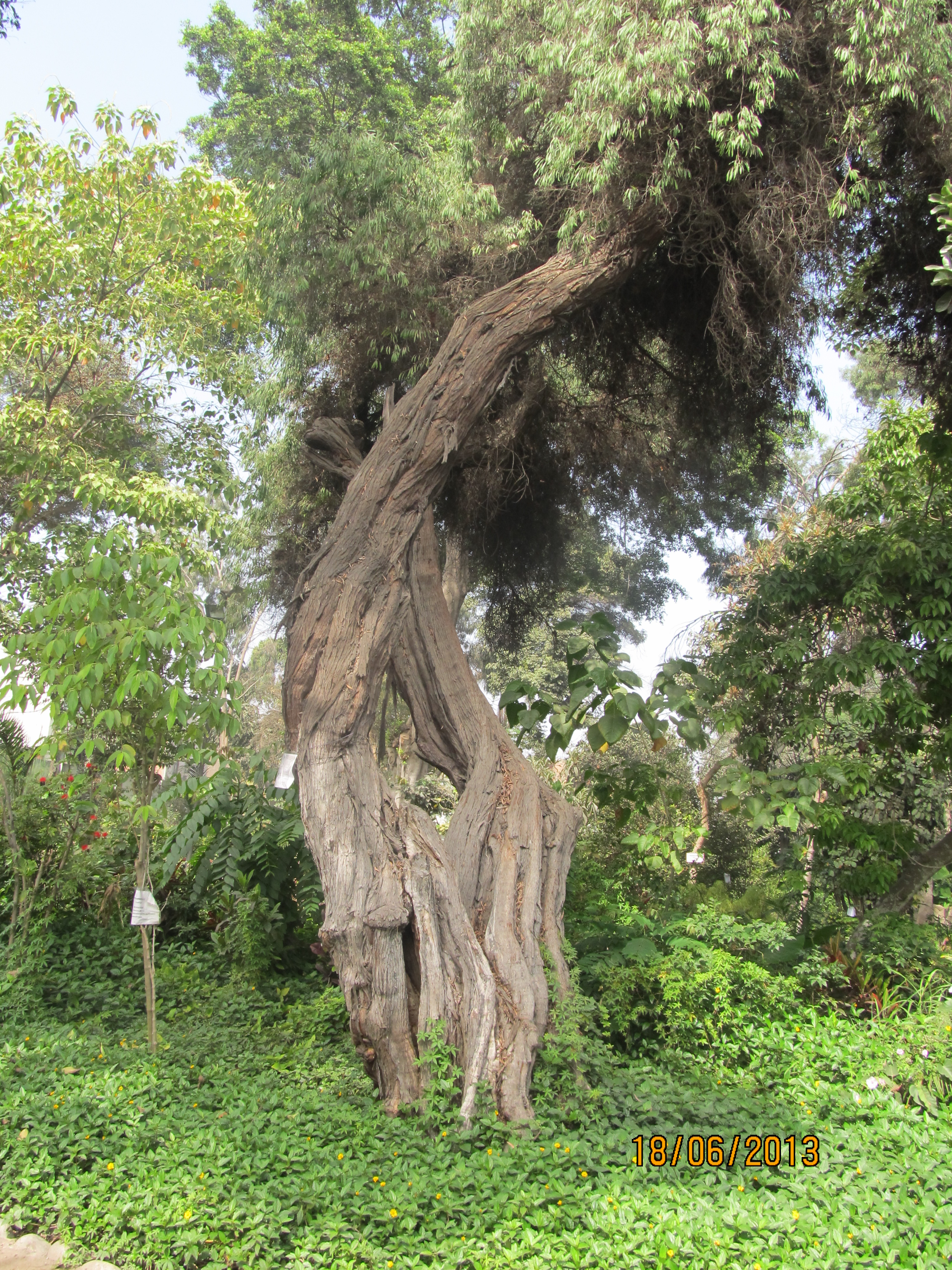

Conservation status
- Endangered (IUCN 3.1)

Scientific classification
- Kingdom: Plantae
- Clade: Tracheophytes
- Clade: Angiosperms
- Clade: Eudicots
- Clade: Rosids
- Order: Sapindales
- Family: Anacardiaceae
- Genus: Haplorhus; Engl.
- Species: H. peruviana

Binomial name
- Haplorhus peruviana Engl.

= Haplorhus =

Genus of flowering plants

Haplorhus is a genus of plants in the family Anacardiaceae. Haplorhus peruviana is the only species in the genus. It is found in dry ravines located in Chile and Peru.
