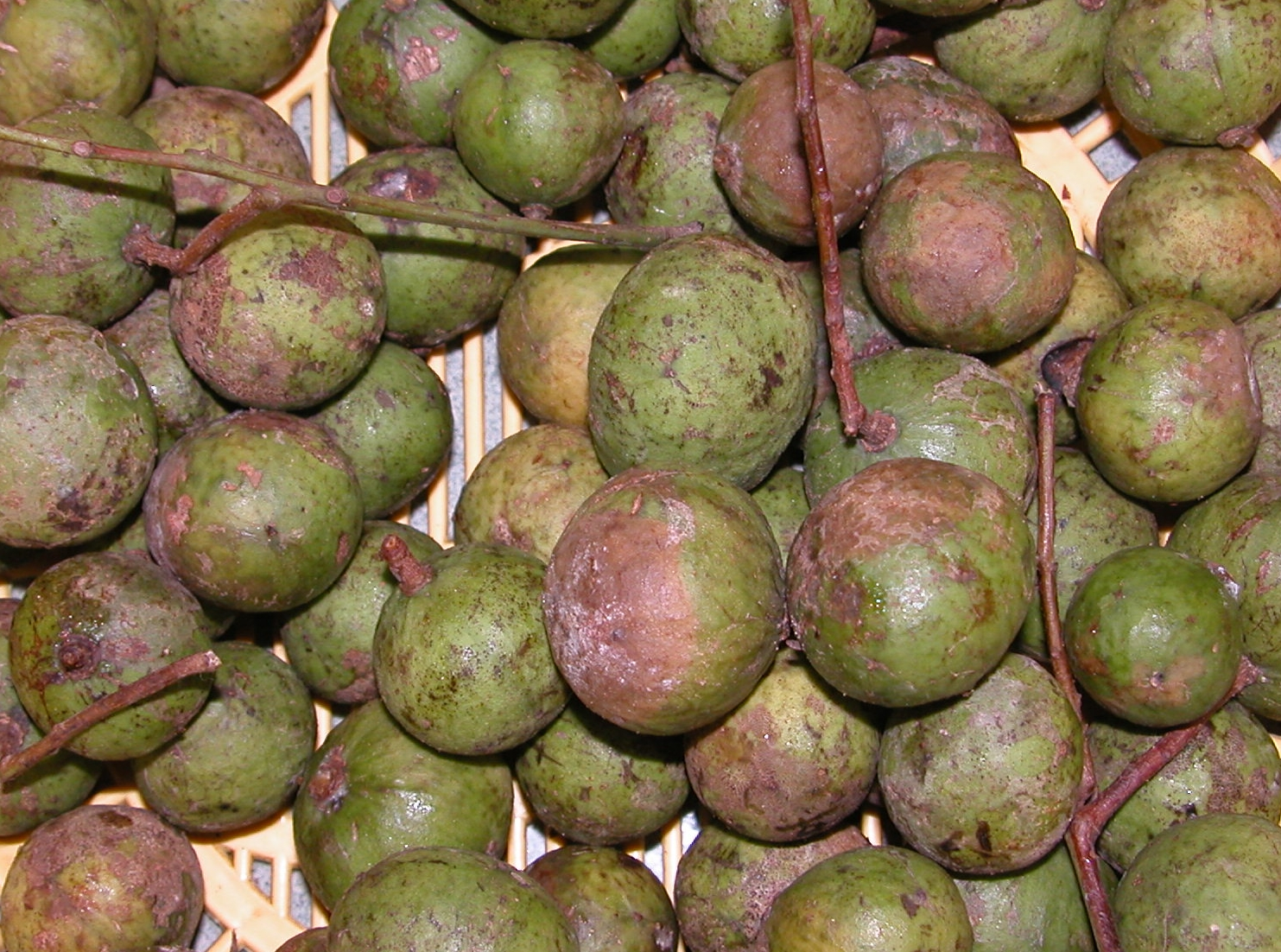
- Fruits of Dracontomelon duperreanum

Scientific classification
- Kingdom: Plantae
- Clade: Embryophytes
- Clade: Tracheophytes
- Clade: Spermatophytes
- Clade: Angiosperms
- Clade: Eudicots
- Clade: Rosids
- Order: Sapindales
- Family: Anacardiaceae
- Subfamily: Spondiadoideae
- Genus: Dracontomelon; Blume, 1850.

= Dracontomelon =

Genus of fruits and plants

Dracontomelon is a genus of flowering plants in the family Anacardiaceae, growing mostly in Southeast Asia and the Pacific islands. The fruit may be used in local cuisine, especially as a souring agent, including in Vietnam, where it is known as sấu.

== Species ==
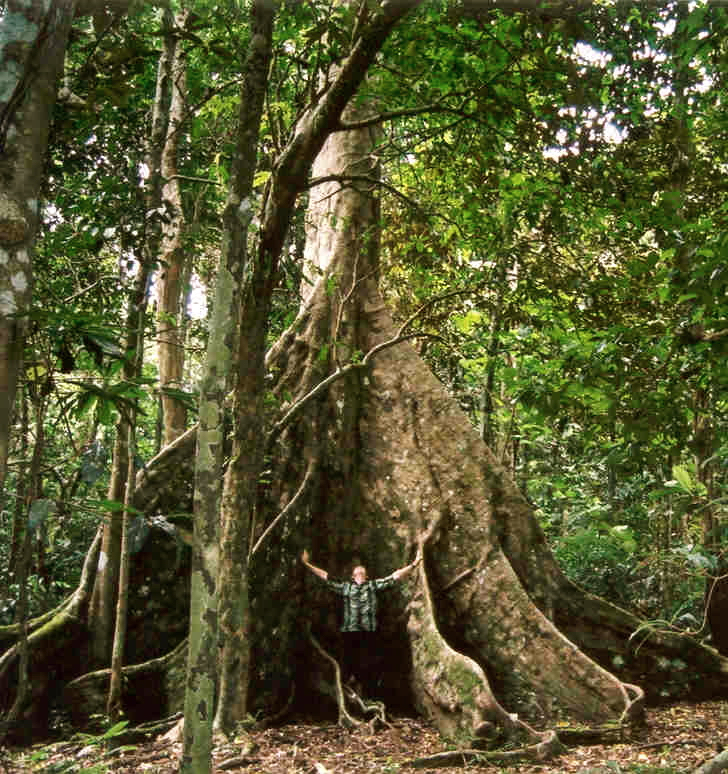
Dracontomelon vitiense − Espiritu Santo island, Vanuatu.

- Dracontomelon costatum Blume - Borneo, Sumatra
- Dracontomelon dao Merr. & Rolfe (many synonyms) - Southeast Asia to Solomon Islands
- Dracontomelon duperreanum Pierre (syn. D. sinense) - southern China and Vietnam
- Dracontomelon laoticum C.M.Evrard & Tardieu
- Dracontomelon lenticulatum Wilkinson - New Guinea
- Dracontomelon macrocarpum Li - China (Yunnan)
- Dracontomelon petelotii Tardieu - northern Vietnam
- Dracontomelon schmidii Tardieu - Vietnam
- Dracontomelon vitiense Engl. - Vanuatu, Fiji, Tonga, Western Samoa (Upolu)

=== Reclassified species ===
The following are known synonyms:

- Dracontomelon cuspidatum Blume: syn. of Dacryodes rostrata (Bl.) H. J. Lam
- D. laoticum Evrard & Tardieu: syn. of Protium serratum (Wall. ex Colebr.) Engl.
- D. pilosum Seem.: syn. of Didymocheton alliaceus (Miq.) Mabb.
- D. papuanum Lauterb.: syn. of Protium macgregorii (F.M.Bailey) Leenh.
- D. multijugum Radlk. (formerly C.DC.): syn. of Toona ciliata var. multijuga (Kurz) Panigrahi & S.C.Mishra

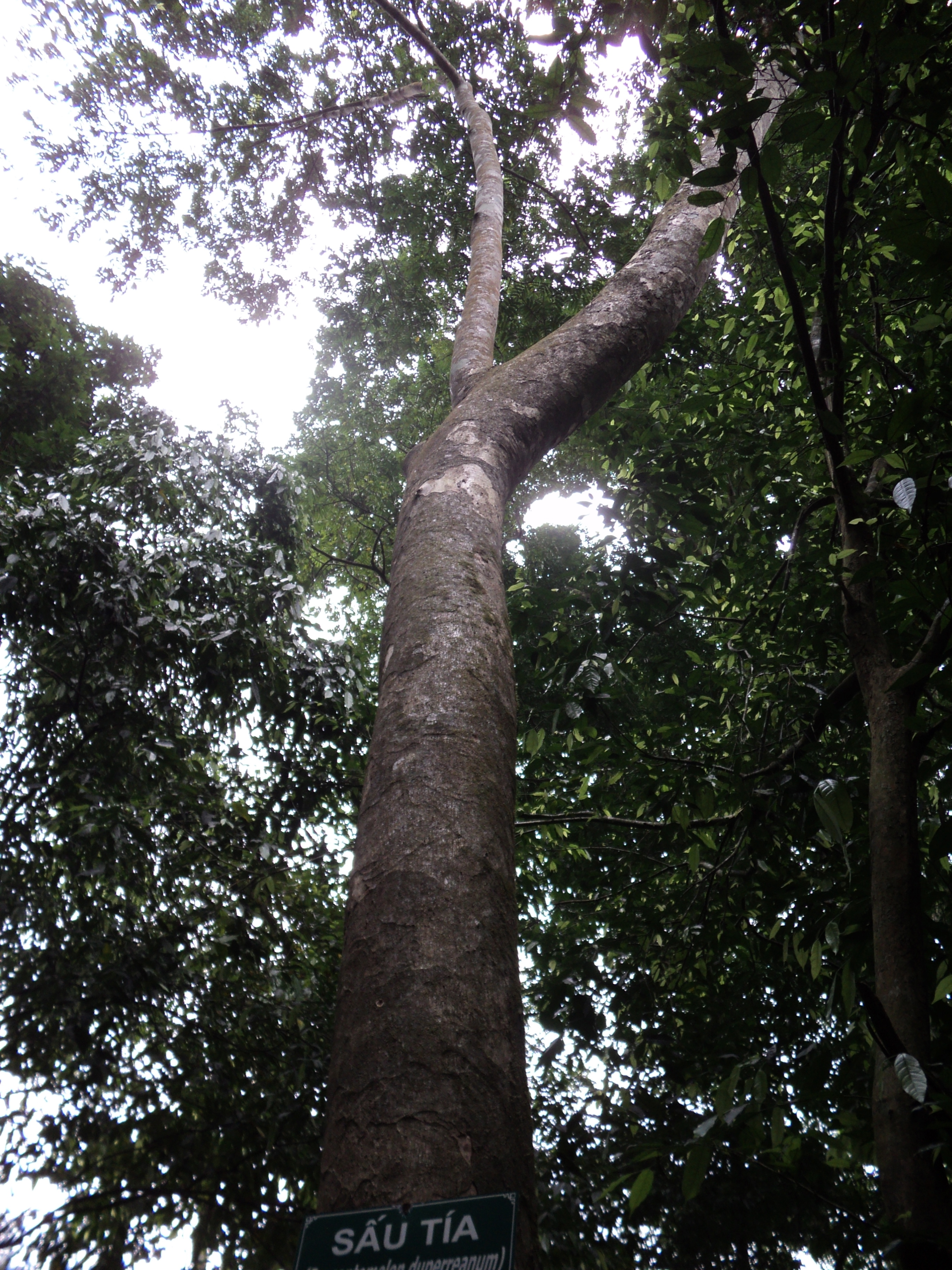
Dracontomelon duperreanum

== Culinary use ==
The most commonly eaten species is Dracontomelon duperreanum, which produces an edible fruit that is eaten in Cambodia, Vietnam and China. In Vietnamese, the plant is called cây sấu and is a common urban tree in Hanoi; the fruit is called quả sấu. The fruit is used in Vietnamese cuisine both as a souring agent and a candied treat similar to the Japanese umeboshi. The treat is popular among youths. In Chinese, the fruit is called 仁面.
