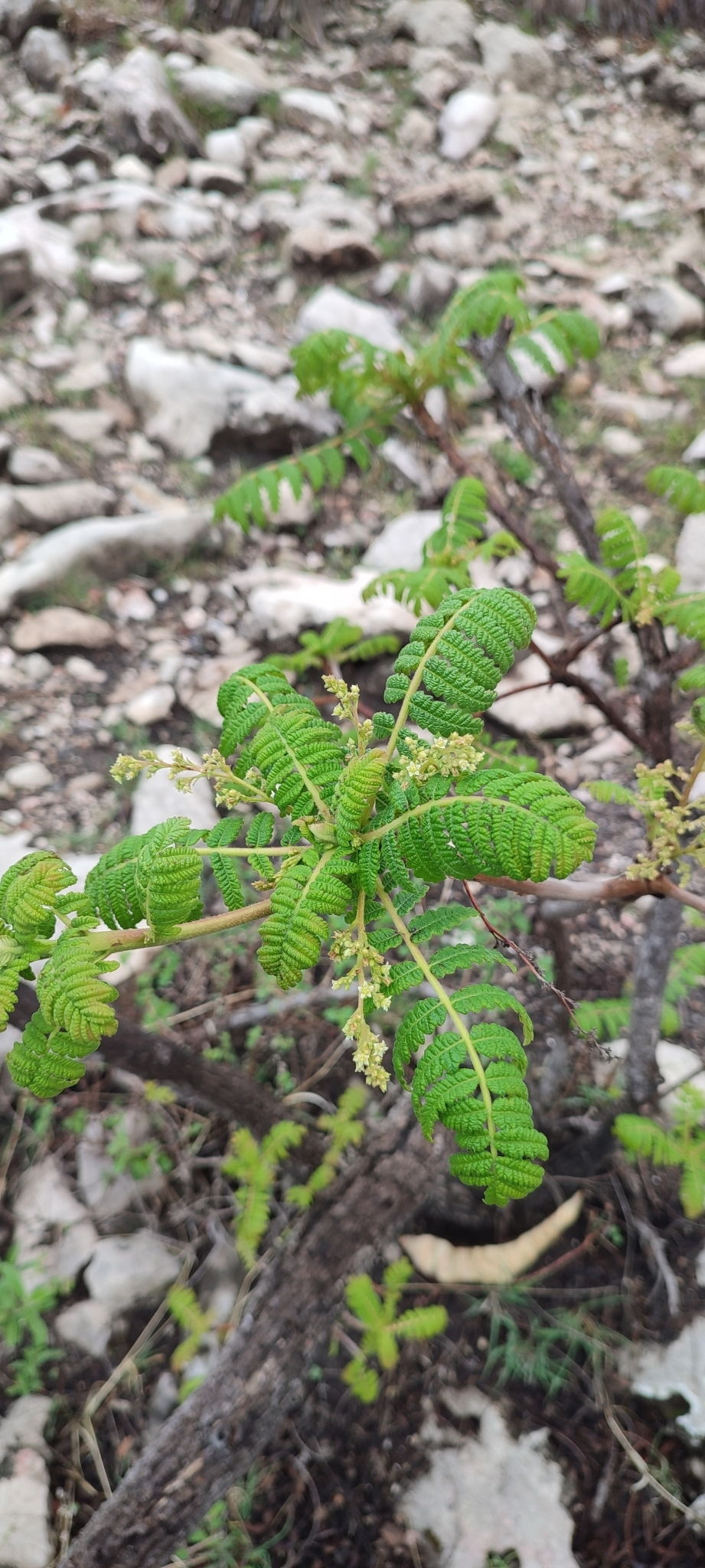

Scientific classification
- Kingdom: Plantae
- Clade: Tracheophytes
- Clade: Angiosperms
- Clade: Eudicots
- Clade: Rosids
- Order: Sapindales
- Family: Anacardiaceae
- Genus: Actinocheita; F.Barkley
- Species: A. filicina

Binomial name
- Actinocheita filicina (DC.) F.A.Barkley

= Actinocheita =

Genus of flowering plants

Actinocheita filicina, commonly known as palo tostado, is a plant species in the family Anacardiaceae, and the only living representative of the monotypic genus Actinocheita.

== Distribution ==
This species is distributed from central and southwest Mexico to Honduras.
