= Micronychia (plant) =

Scientific classification
- Kingdom: Plantae
- Clade: Embryophytes
- Clade: Tracheophytes
- Clade: Angiosperms
- Clade: Eudicots
- Clade: Rosids
- Clade: Malvids
- Order: Sapindales
- Family: Anacardiaceae
- Subfamily: Anacardioideae
- Genus: Micronychia; Oliv.

Species
- See text

Genus of flowering plants

Micronychia is a genus of flowering plants in the family Anacardiaceae, with all species endemic to Madagascar, usually on the eastern side of the island.

== Species ==
The following species are accepted:

- Micronychia acuminata Randrian.
- Micronychia bemangidiensis Randrian. & Lowry
- Micronychia benono Randrian. & Lowry
- Micronychia danguyana H.Perrier
- Micronychia kotozafii Randrian. & Lowry
- Micronychia macrophylla H.Perrier
- Micronychia madagascariensis Oliv.
- Micronychia minutiflora (H.Perrier) Randrian. & Lowry
- Micronychia striata Randrian. & Lowry
- Micronychia tsiramiramy H.Perrier
