= Haematostaphis =

Scientific classification
- Kingdom: Plantae
- Clade: Tracheophytes
- Clade: Angiosperms
- Clade: Eudicots
- Clade: Rosids
- Order: Sapindales
- Family: Anacardiaceae
- Genus: Haematostaphis; Hook.f. (1860)
- Species: H. barteri

Binomial name
- Haematostaphis barteri Hook.f. (1860)

Synonyms
- Haematostaphis purpurascens Engl. (1911)

Genus of plants

Haematostaphis barteri is a species of flowering plant belonging to the family Anacardiaceae. It is a tree which ranges from western Tropical Africa to Sudan. It is the sole species in genus Haematostaphis.
