= Solenocarpus =

Scientific classification
- Kingdom: Plantae
- Clade: Tracheophytes
- Clade: Angiosperms
- Clade: Eudicots
- Clade: Rosids
- Order: Sapindales
- Family: Anacardiaceae
- Genus: Solenocarpus; Wight & Arn. (1834)

Synonyms
- Skoliostigma Lauterb. (1920)

Genus of plants

Solenocarpus is a genus of flowering plants belonging to the family Anacardiaceae.

Its native range is Southern India to Malesia and New Guinea.

Species:

- Solenocarpus indicus Wight & Arn.
- Solenocarpus philippinensis (Elmer) Kosterm.
