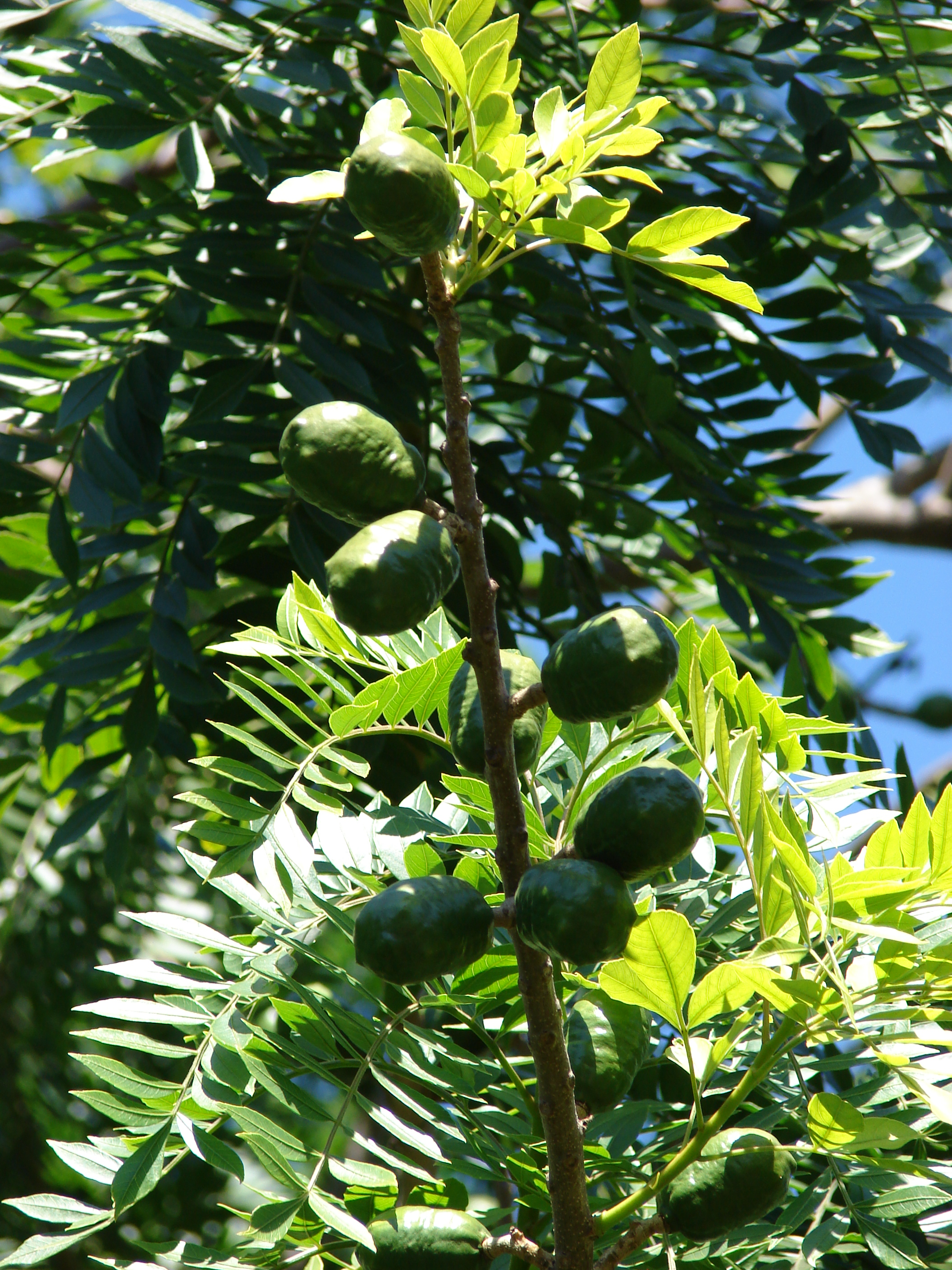
- Fruiting Spondias mombin

Scientific classification
- Kingdom: Plantae
- Clade: Tracheophytes
- Clade: Angiosperms
- Clade: Eudicots
- Clade: Rosids
- Order: Sapindales
- Family: Anacardiaceae
- Subfamily: Spondiadoideae
- Genus: Spondias; L.

Type species
- Spondias mombin L.

Species
- See text

Synonyms
- Chrysomelon G.Forst. ex A.Gray, pro syn.; Cytheraea Wight & Arn., nom. provis.; Evia Comm. ex Blume; Monbin Mill.; Warmingia Engl., nom. rej.; Wirtgenia Jungh. ex Hassk., not validly publ.

= Spondias =

Genus of fruit trees

Spondias is a genus of flowering plants in the cashew family, Anacardiaceae. The genus consists of 18 described species, eleven of which are native to the tropical Americas, six to Asia and one to Madagascar. They are commonly named hog plums, Spanish plums, Ciruelas in Cuba, libas in Bikol and in some cases golden apples for their brightly colored fruit which resemble an apple or small plum at a casual glance. They are only distantly related to apple and plum trees, however. A more unequivocal common name is mombins.

== Description ==
Members of this genus are deciduous trees with resinous exudates which can cause contact dermatitis in humans. The leaves are imparipinnate (bipinnate in Spondias bipinnata), and are arranged alternately on the branches. Leaflets have an intramarginal vein, i.e. a vein running close and parallel to the leaf margin.

The inflorescences are produced at the ends of the branches or in the leaf axils, and take the form of a panicle or raceme. Most species are hermaphroditic (having flowers with male and female organs, i.e. bisexual flowers) or polygamodioecious (having a combination of bisexual flowers plus either male flowers or female flowers), while the species S. pupurea is dioecious (having male and female flowers on separate plants).

The fruit are fleshy drupes which may be globular, elliptic or oblong; yellow, orange, red, purple or green; with a hard endocarp surrounded by a fibrous layer.

== Names ==
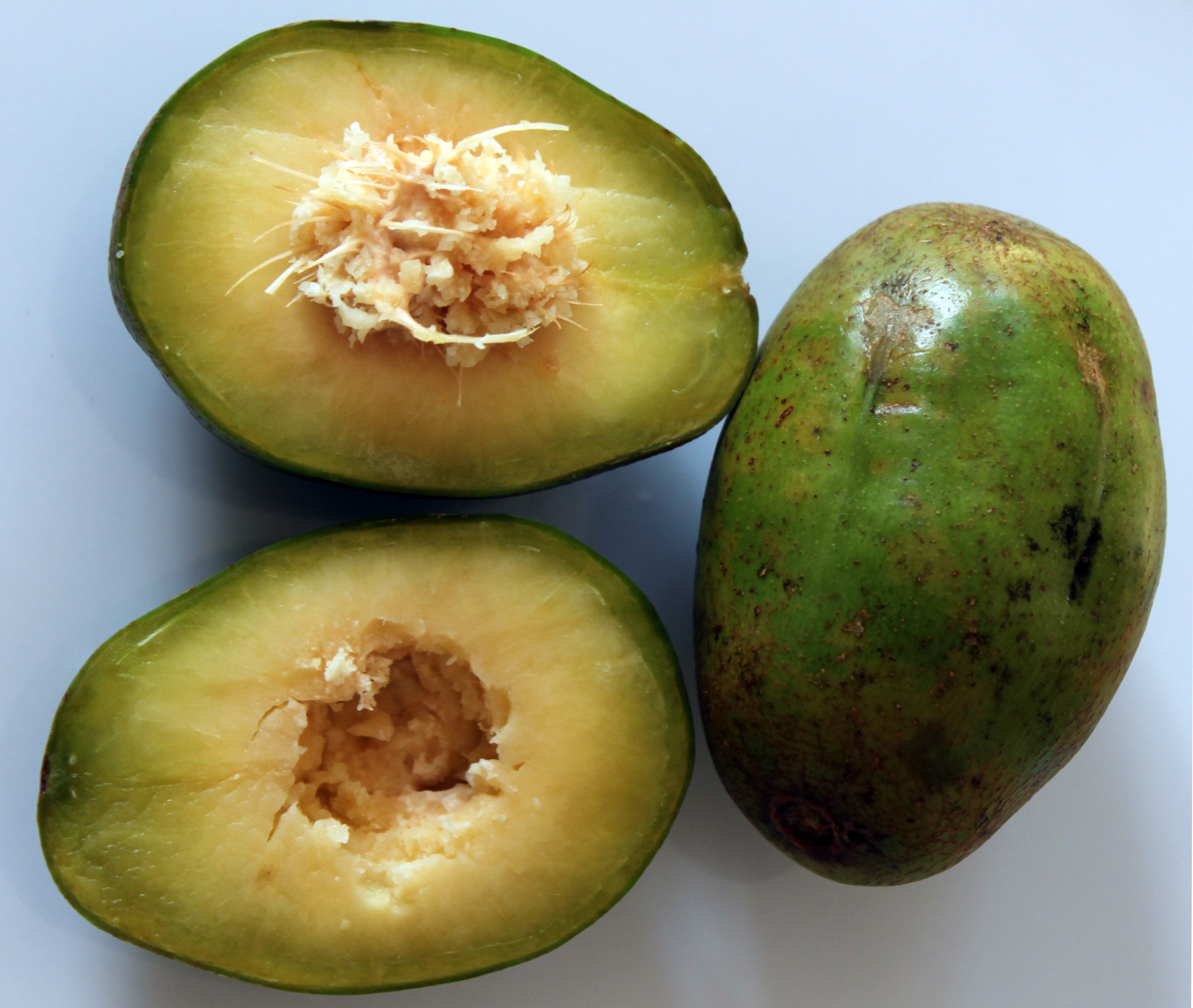
Spondias dulcis, fruit, section and seed

A theory regarding the name of the city of Bangkok, Thailand is that the name is derived from Thai: -มะกอกน้ำ; RTGS: makok nam 'water olive', the Thai name for the fruit of Spondias dulcis. In Cambodia, Spondias pinnata is called /pɷːn siː pʰlaɛ/ (ពោនស៊ីផ្លែ) or /məkaʔ prẹj/ (ម្កាក់ព្រៃ), and Spondias dulcis simply /məkaʔ/ (ម្កាក់). Spondias pinnata is called Pulicha kaai in the Tamil language, which means "sour fruit." It is also called "Amate Kaai" in the Kannada language, Ambade in Tulu and Konkani. In Sri Lanka it is called Amberella. In Bangladesh it is known as Aamra (আমড়া) and when served with seasonings it is a very popular street food.

== As food ==
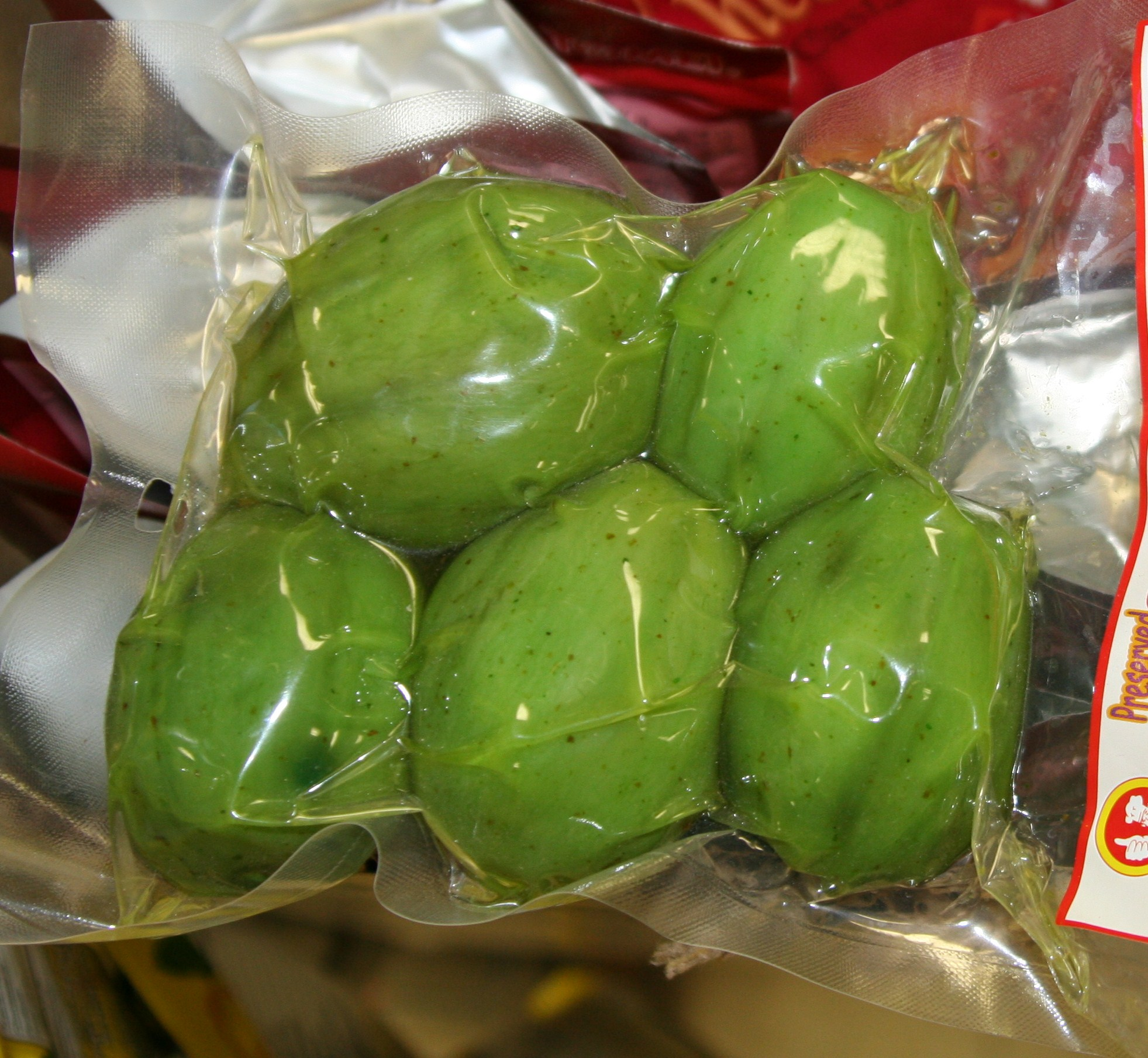
Preserved ma-kok, sweet and sour with chili

About 10 species of Spondias bear edible fruits and have been domesticated for fruit production. These fruits are also consumed by herbivorous mammals such as deer.

In the Western Ghats of Karnataka flower buds and tender fruits are used in pickle preparation. In Thai cuisine both the fruits and the tender leaves are eaten. In Odisha its called ambada, the fruit is used as a souring agent in curries.

== Species ==
As of January 2024, Plants of the World online accepts 18 species:

- Spondias admirabilis J.D.Mitch. & Daly – Brazil
- Spondias bahiensis P.Carvalho, Van den Berg & M.Machado – Brazil
- Spondias bipinnata Airy Shaw & Forman – Thailand
- Spondias dulcis Parkinson – Maluku to Solomon Islands
- Spondias expeditionaria J.D.Mitch. & Daly – Brazil
- Spondias globosa J.D.Mitch. & Daly – Brazil North, Bolivia
- Spondias macrocarpa Engl. – Brazil
- Spondias malayana Kosterm. – Indo-China to New Guinea
- Spondias mombin L. – Mexico to Tropical America
- Spondias novoguineensis Kosterm. – Maluku to Vanuatu
- Spondias pinnata (L.f.) Kurz – Indian Subcontinent to China and Lesser Sunda Islands
- Spondias purpurea L. – Mexico to northern Colombia
- Spondias radlkoferi Donn.Sm. – Mexico to Venezuela
- Spondias tefyi J.D.Mitch., Daly & Randrian. – Madagascar
- Spondias testudinis J.D.Mitch. & Daly – Bolivia, Brazil North, Peru
- Spondias tuberosa Arruda – Brazil
- Spondias venulosa (Mart. ex Engl.) Engl. – Brazil
- Spondias xerophila Kosterm. – Sri Lanka

Selected synonyms include:

- Spondias cytherea Sonn. — synonym of Spondias dulcis
- Spondias haplophylla Airy Shaw & Forman — synonym of Bouea oppositifolia (Roxb.) Meisn.
- Spondias indica (Wight & Arn.) Airy Shaw & Forman — synonym of Solenocarpus indicus Wight & Arn.
- Spondias lakonensis Pierre — synonym of Allospondias lakonensis (Pierre) Stapf
