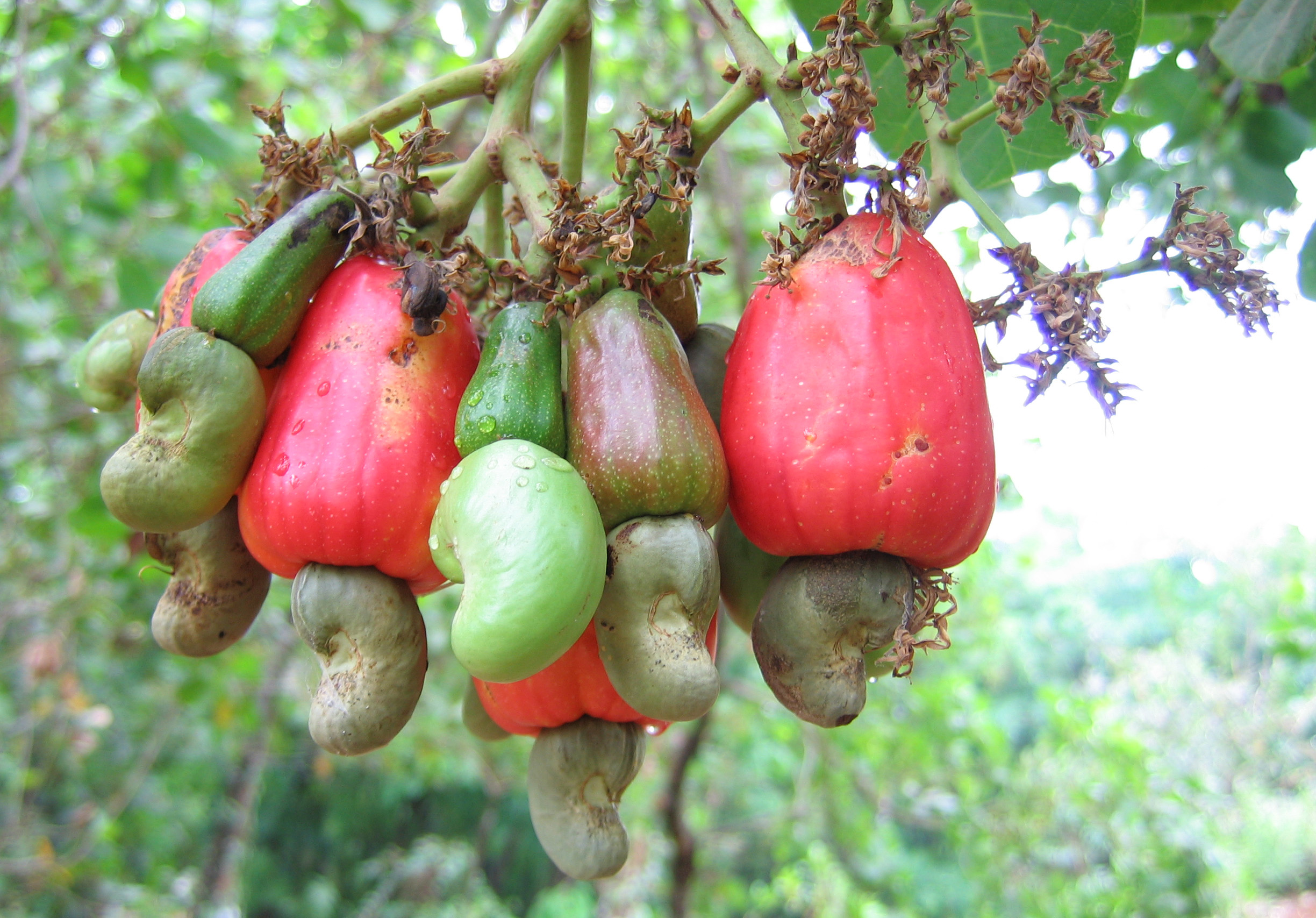
- Cashew (Anacardium occidentale)

Scientific classification
- Kingdom: Plantae
- Clade: Tracheophytes
- Clade: Angiosperms
- Clade: Eudicots
- Clade: Rosids
- Order: Sapindales
- Family: Anacardiaceae (R.Br.) Lindl.

Subfamilies
- Anacardioideae; Spondiadoideae

= Anacardiaceae =

Family of flowering plants that includes cashew and mango

The Anacardiaceae, commonly known as the cashew family or sumac family, are a family of flowering plants, including about 83 genera with about 860 known species. Members of the Anacardiaceae bear fruits that are drupes and in some cases produce urushiol, an irritant. The Anacardiaceae include numerous genera, several of which are economically important, notably cashew (in the type genus Anacardium), mango, Chinese lacquer tree, yellow mombin, Peruvian pepper, sumac, smoke tree, marula, and cuachalalate. The genus Pistacia (which includes the pistachio and mastic tree) is now included, but was previously placed in its own family, the Pistaciaceae.

The cashew family is more abundant in warm or tropical regions, with only a few species living in the temperate zones. Mostly native to tropical Americas, Africa, and India. Pistacia and some species of Rhus can be found in southern Europe, Rhus species can be found in much of North America, and Schinus inhabits South America exclusively.

== Description ==
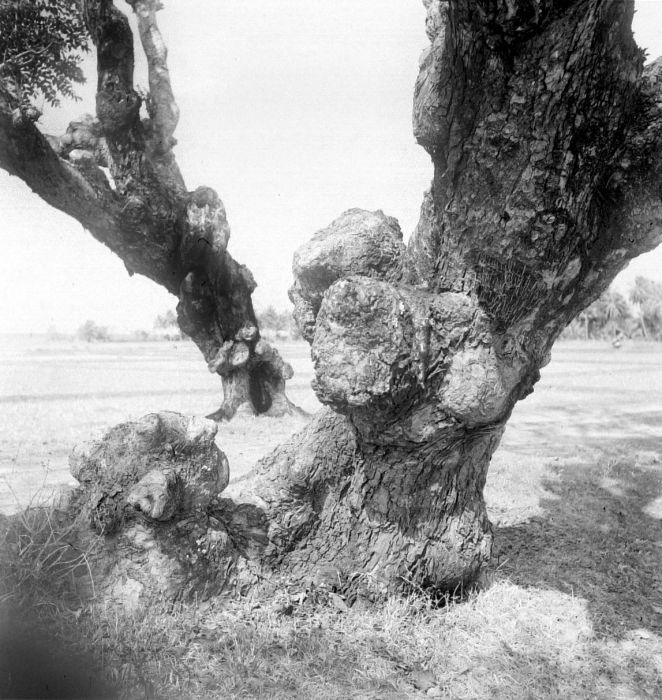
Lannea coromandelica (Lannea grandis) in Banten, Indonesia

Trees or shrubs, each has inconspicuous flowers and resinous or milky sap that may be highly poisonous, as in black poisonwood, and sometimes foul-smelling. Resin canals located in the inner fibrous bark of the fibrovascular system found in the plant's stems, roots, and leaves are characteristic of all members of this family; resin canals located in the pith are characteristic of many of the cashew family species and several species have them located in the primary cortex or the regular bark. Tannin sacs are also widespread among the family.

The wood of the Anacardiaceae has the frequent occurrence of simple, small holes in the vessels, occasionally in some species side by side with scalariform holes (in Campnosperma, Micronychia, and Heeria argentea (Anaphrenium argenteum). The simple pits are located along the vessel wall and in contact with the parenchyma.

Leaves are deciduous or evergreen, usually alternate (rarely opposite), estipulate (without stipule) and imparipinnate (rarely paripinnate or bipinnate), usually with opposite leaflets (rarely alternate), while others are trifoliolate or simple or unifoliolate (very rarely simple leaves are palmate). Leaf architecture is very diverse. Primary venation is pinnate (rarely palmate). Secondary venation is eucamptodromous, brochidodromous, craspedodromous or cladodromous (rarely reticulodromous) Cladodromous venation, if present is considered diagnostic for the Anacardiaceae.

Flowers grow at the end of a branch or stem or at an angle from where the leaf joins the stem and have bracts. Often with this family, bisexual and male flowers occur on some plants, and bisexual and female flowers are on others, or flowers have both stamens and pistils (perfect). A calyx with three to seven cleft sepals and the same number of petals, occasionally no petals, overlap each other in the bud. Stamens are twice as many or equal to the number of petals, inserted at the base of the fleshy ring or cup-shaped disk, and inserted below the pistil(s). Stamen stalks are separate, and anthers are able to move. Flowers have the ovary free, but the petals and stamen are borne on the calyx. In the stamenate flowers, ovaries are single-celled. In the pistillate flowers, ovaries are single or sometimes quadri- or quinticelled. One to three styles and one ovule occur in each cavity.

Fruits rarely open at maturity (exceptions include the pistachio) and are most often drupes.

Seed coats are very thin or are crust-like. Little or no endosperm is present. Cotyledons are fleshy. Seeds are solitary with no albumen around the embryo.

== Taxonomy ==
=== History ===
In 1759, Bernard de Jussieu arranged the plants in the royal garden of the Trianon at Versailles, according to his own scheme. That classification included a description of an order called the Terebintaceæ, which contained a suborder that included Cassuvium (Anacardium), Anacardium (Semecarpus), Mangifera, Connarus, Rhus, and Rourea. In 1789, Antoine Laurent de Jussieu, nephew of Bernard de Jussieu, published that classification scheme.

Robert Brown described a subset of the Terebintaceae called Cassuvlæ or Anacardeæ in 1818, using the herbarium that was collected by Christen Smith during a fated expedition headed by James Hingston Tuckey to explore the River Congo. The name and genera were based on the order with the same name that had been described by de Jussieu in 1759. The herbarium from that expedition contained only one genus from the family, Rhus.

Augustin Pyramus de Candolle in 1824, used Robert Brown's name Cassuvlæ or Anacardeæ, wrote another description of the group, and filled it with the genera Anacardium, Semecarpus, Holigarna, Mangifera, Buchanania, Pistacia, Astronium, Comocladia, and Picramnia.

John Lindley described the "essential character" of the Anacardiaceæ, the "Cashew Tribe" in 1831, adopting the order that was described by de Jussieu, but abandoning the name Terebintaceæ. He includes the genera that were found in de Candolle's Anacardieæ and Sumachineæ: Anacardium, Holigarna, Mangifera, Rhus, and Mauria.

=== Phylogeny ===
The genus Pistacia has sometimes been separated into its own family, the Pistaciaceae, based on the reduced flower structure, differences in pollen, and the feathery style of the flowers.The nature of its ovary, though, does suggest it belongs in the Anacardiaceae, a position supported by morphological and molecular studies, and recent classifications have included Pistacia in the Anacardiaceae. The genus Abrahamia was separated from Protorhus in 2004.(Pell 2004)

=== Subdivision ===
The family has been treated as a series of five tribes by Engler, and later into subfamilies by Takhtajan, as Anacardioideae (including tribes Anacardieae, Dobineae, Rhoideae, and Semecarpeae) and Spondiadoideae (including tribe Spondiadeae). Pell's (2008) molecular analysis reinstated the two subfamilies without further division into tribes (Pell 2004). Later, Min and Barfod, in the Flora of China (2008) reinstated the five tribes (four in Anacardioideae), and the single tribe Spondiadeae as Spondiadoideae.

=== Genera ===
81 genera are accepted:

- Abrahamia Randrian. & Lowry
- Actinocheita F.Barkley
- Allospondias (Pierre) Stapf
- Amphipterygium Schiede ex Standl.
- Anacardium L. – cashew
- Androtium Stapf
- Antrocaryon Pierre
- Astronium Jacq.
- Attilaea E.Martinez and Ramos
- Baronia Baker
- Blepharocarya F.Muell.
- Bonetiella Rzed.
- Bouea Meisn.
- Buchanania Spreng.
- Campnosperma Thwaites
- Campylopetalum Forman
- Cardenasiodendron F.A.Barkley
- Choerospondias B.L.Burtt & A.W.Hill
- Comocladia P.Browne
- Cotinus Mill. – smoke tree
- Cyrtocarpa Kunth
- Dobinea Buch.-Ham. ex D.Don
- Dracontomelon Blume
- Drimycarpus Hook.f.
- Euroschinus Hook.f.
- Faguetia Marchand
- Fegimanra Pierre
- Gluta L.
- Haematostaphis Hook.f.
- Haplorhus Engl.
- Harpephyllum Bernh.
- Heeria Meisn.
- Holigarna Buch.-Ham. ex Roxb.
- Koordersiodendron Engl. ex Koord.
- Lannea A.Rich.
- Laurophyllus Thunb.
- Lithraea Miers ex Hook. & Arn.
- Loxopterygium Hook.f.
- Loxostylis Spreng. ex Rchb.
- Malosma (Nutt.) Abrams
- Mangifera L. – mango
- Mauria Kunth
- Melanochyla Hook.f.
- Metopium P.Browne
- Micronychia Oliv.
- Mosquitoxylum Krug & Urb.
- Myracrodruon Allemão
- Nothopegia Blume
- Ochoterenaea F.A.Barkley
- Operculicarya H.Perrier
- Orthopterygium Hemsl.
- Ozoroa Delile
- Pachycormus Coville ex Standl.
- Parishia Hook.f.
- Pegia Colebr.
- Pentaspadon Hook.f.
- Pistacia L. – pistachio
- Pleiogynium Engl.
- Poupartia Comm. ex Juss.
- Poupartiopsis Capuron ex J.D.Mitch. & Daly
- Protorhus Engl.
- Pseudosmodingium Engl.
- Pseudospondias Engl.
- Rhodosphaera Engl.
- Rhus L. – sumac
- Schinopsis Engl.
- Schinus L. – peppertree
- Sclerocarya Hochst.
- Searsia F.A.Barkley
- Semecarpus L.f.
- Smodingium E.Mey. ex Sond.
- Solenocarpus Wight & Arn.
- Sorindeia Thouars
- Spondias L.
- Swintonia Griff.
- Tapirira Aubl.
- Thyrsodium Salzm. ex Benth.
- Toxicodendron Mill. – poison ivy, poison oak, poison sumac
- Trichoscypha Hook.f.
- Tumultivenia J.D.Mitch. & Daly
- Uniostium J.D.Mitch. & Daly

== Uses ==
Members of this family produce cashew and pistachio nuts, and mango and marula fruits.

Some members produce a viscous or adhesive fluid which turns black and is used as a varnish or for tanning and even as a mordant for red dyes. The sap of Toxicodendron vernicifluum is used to make lacquer for lacquerware and similar products.

== Etymology ==
The name Anacardium, originally from the Greek, refers to the nut, core or heart of the fruit, which is outwardly located: ana means "upward" and -cardium means "heart").

== Bibliography ==
- Aguilar-Ortigoza, Carlos; Sosa, Victoria; Angeles, Guillermo (April 2004). "Phylogenetic relationships of three genera in Anacardiaceae: Bonetiella, Pseudosmodingium, and Smodingium". Brittonia. 56 (2): 169–184. doi:10.1663/0007-196X(2004)056[0169:PROTGI]2.0.CO;2. S2CID 25623042.
- Andrés-Hernández, A. R.; Terrazas, Teresa (October 2009). "Leaf architecture of Rhus s.str. (Anacardiaceae)". Feddes Repertorium. 120 (5–6): 293–306. doi:10.1002/fedr.200911109. Archived from the original on 17 July 2021.
- Britton, Nathaniel Lord; Brown, Hon. Addison (1897). An Illustrated Flora of the Northern United States, Canada and the British Possessions From Newfoundland to the Parallel of the Southern Boundary of Virginia, and from the Atlantic Ocean Westward to the 102D Meridian. Vol. II, Portulacaceae to Menyanthaceae. Charles Scribner's Sons. Archived from the original on 20 February 2017.
- Brown, F.R.S., Robert; Tuckey, James Hingston; Christen, Smith (1818). "Observations, Systematical and Geographical, on Professor Christian Smith's Collection of Plants from the Vicinity of the River Congo". Narrative of an Expedition to Explore the River Zaire Usually Called the Congo, in South Africa, in 1816, Under the Direction of Captain J.H. Tuckey, R.N., to Which is Added, the Journals of Professor Smith; Some General Observations on the Country and Its Inhabitants; and an Appendix: Containing the Natural History of That Part of the Kingdom Congo Through Which the Zaire Flows. London: John Murray. Archived from the original on 12 October 2013.
- Candolle, Augustin Pyramus de; Candolle, Alphonse de (1825). Prodromus systematis naturalis regni vegetabilis: sive enumeratio contracta ordinum generum specierumque plantarum huc usque cognitarum, juxta methodi naturalis normas digesta. Pars Secunda (in Latin). Paris: Sumptibus Victoris Masson. Archived from the original on 21 February 2017.
- Jussieu, Bernard de (1789). Genera plantarum :secundum ordines naturales disposita, juxta methodum in Horto regio parisiensi exaratam, anno M.DCC.LXXIV (in Latin). Paris: Apud Viduam Herissant et Theophilum Barrois. Archived from the original on 18 April 2009.
- Kubitzki, Klaus, ed. (2011). The Families and Genera of Vascular Plants vol. x. Flowering Plants. Eudicots: Sapindales, Cucurbitales, Myrtaceae. Springer Science & Business Media. ISBN 978-3-642-14397-7. Archived from the original on 21 February 2017.
- Kunth, C. S. (1824). "Terebintacearum Genera: denuo ad examen revocare, characteribus magis accuratis distinguere, inque spetem familias, distribuere conatus est". Annales des Sciences Naturelles (in French). Tome Second. Paris: Chez Bechet Jeune. Archived from the original on 16 April 2009.
- Lindley, F.R.S., John; Torrey, M.D., John (1831). An Introduction to the Natural System of Botany: or A Systematic View of the Organization, Natural Affinities, and Geographical Distribution of the Whole Vegetable Kingdom; Together with the Uses of the Most Important Species in Medicine, the Arts and Rural or Domestic Economy (First American ed.). New York: G. & C. & H. Carvill. Archived from the original on 12 October 2013.
- Mitchell, John D.; Daly, Douglas C. (5 August 2015). "A revision of Spondias L. (Anacardiaceae) in the Neotropics". PhytoKeys (55): 1–92. doi:10.3897/phytokeys.55.8489. PMC 4547026. PMID 26312044.
- Moffett, R.O. (2007). "Name changes in the Old World Rhus and recognition of Searsia (Anacardiaceae". Bothalia. 37 (2): 165–175. doi:10.4102/abc.v37i2.311. Archived from the original on 21 February 2017.
- Müller, Hermann; Knuth, Dr. Paul; Davis, James Richard Ainsworth (1908). "XXXII. Order Anacardiaceae". Handbook of Flower Pollination Based Upon Hermann Müller's Work 'The Fertilisation of Flowers by Insects'. Vol. II, Ranunculaceae to Stylidieae. Oxford: Clarendon Press. pp. 258–259. Archived from the original on 20 February 2017.
- Pell, Susan Katherine (May 2004). Molecular systematics of the cashew family (Anacardiaceae) (PDF). Department of Biological Sciences, Louisiana State University. Archived from the original (PhD thesis) on 21 August 2008.
- Pell, Susan K.; Mitchell, John D.; Lowry, Porter P.; Randrianasolo, Armand; Urbatsch, Lowell E. (1 April 2008). "Phylogenetic Split of Malagasy and African Taxa of Protorhus and Rhus (Anacardiaceae) Based on cpDNA trnL–trnF and nrDNA ETS and ITS Sequence Data". Systematic Botany. 33 (2): 375–383. doi:10.1600/036364408784571545. S2CID 86329117.
- Pell, SK; Mitchell, JD; Miller, AJ; Lobova, TA (10 December 2010). Anacardiaceae R.Br. (1818). Springer. pp. 7–50. ISBN 9783642143977. Archived from the original on 21 February 2017., in Kubitzki (2011)
- Solereder, Hans; Scott, D. H. (1908). Systematic Anatomy of the Dicotyledons, A Handbook for Laboratories of Pure and Applied Botany. Vol. I, Introduction, Polypetalae, Gamopetalae. trans. Leonard A. Boodle, Felix Eugene Fritsch. Oxford: Clarendon Press. Archived from the original on 20 February 2017.
- Turpin, Pierre Jean François; Jussieu, Antoine-Laurent de (1828). "Térébintacées". Dictionnaire des Sciences Naturelles, Dans Lequel on Traite Méthodiquement des Différens Êtres de la Nature, Considérés Soit en Eux-Mêmes, d'Aprés l'État Actuel de nos Connoissances, soit Relativement à l'Utilité Qu'en Peuvent Retirer la Médecine, l'Agriculture, le Commerce et les Arts (in French). Vol. 53. Strasbourg: G. Levrault. pp. 120–126.
