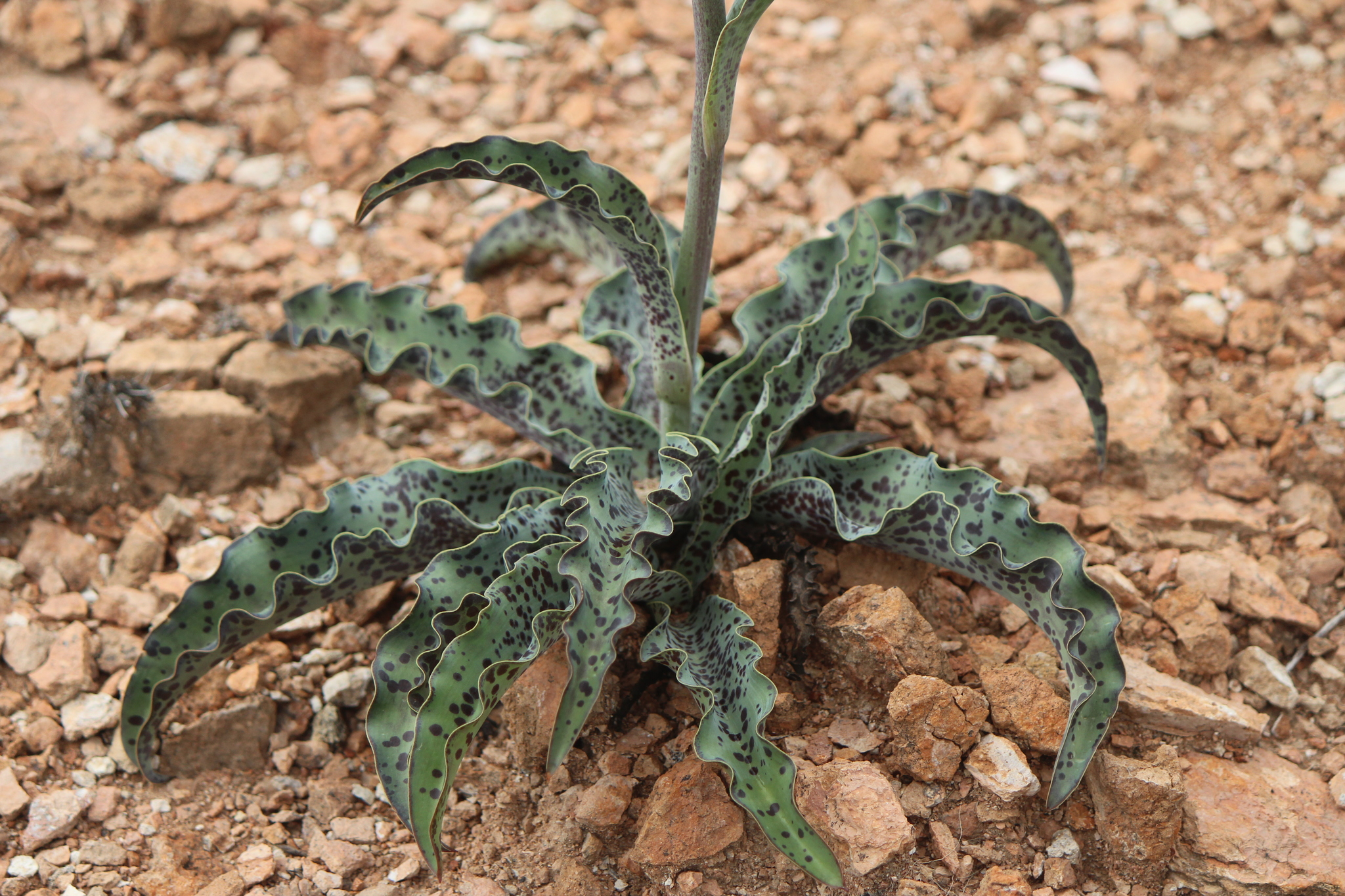
- Manfreda guttata

Scientific classification
- Kingdom: Plantae
- Clade: Tracheophytes
- Clade: Angiosperms
- Clade: Monocots
- Order: Asparagales
- Family: Asparagaceae
- Subfamily: Agavoideae
- Genus: Manfreda; Salisb.

Synonyms
- Allibertia Marion ex Baker; Leichtlinia H.Ross; Runyonia Rose

= Manfreda =

Genus of flowering plants

Manfreda is a genus of flowering plants in the family Asparagaceae, subfamily Agavoideae. Along with Polianthes, members are commonly called tuberoses. The generic name honours 14th-century Italian writer Manfredus de Monte Imperiale.

Manfreda species, like those in related genera Agave and Polianthes, have rosettes of leaves branching from a very short stem, and flowers at the end of a long stalk. The flowers are tubular and whitish, yellow, green, or brownish, with lengthy stamens.

== Taxonomy ==
Manfreda and close relatives have long presented significant taxonomic difficulty. With the advent of DNA sequencing, new karyologic and evolutionary phylogenetic studies showed that Manfreda, along with Polianthes and Prochnyanthes, were genetically nested within the traditional circumscription of Agave, rendering that genus paraphyletic. Early in the 21st century, these new phylogenetic results led to a reclassification of to include Manfreda, Polianthes and Prochnyanthes together as Agave subgenus Manfreda.

There was reaction against the changes from those who noted that the large morphological differences between the genera in this new Agave s.l. making them "counter-intuitive from a horticultural point of view". Manfreda morphologically differs from the classic Agave description in being herbaceous and bulbous. Thus, based on a wider consideration of previously established genetic, morphological, and estimated genetic divergence times, Vázquez-García et al. proposed a narrower circumscription of Agave, paving the way for a reconsideration of Manfreda as a genus.

== Species ==
Plants of the World Online currently accepts 38 species in genus Manfreda, listed here with their Agave synonyms.

- Manfreda arceliensis Art.Castro, J.G.Zavala & Cruz Durán
- Manfreda brunnea (S.Watson) Rose = Agave brunnea
- Manfreda bulbulifera Castillejos & E.Solano = Agave bulbulifera
- Manfreda chamelensis E.J.Lott & Verh.-Will. = Agave chamelensis
- Manfreda elongata Rose = Agave gracillima
- Manfreda fusca Ravenna = Agave fusca
- Manfreda galvaniae A.Castañeda, S.Franco & García-Mend. = Agave galvaniae
- Manfreda guerrerensis Matuda = Agave guerrerensis
- Manfreda guttata (Jacobi & C.D.Bouché) Rose = Agave guttata
- Manfreda hauniensis (J.B.Petersen) Verh.-Will. = Agave hauniensis
- Manfreda involuta McVaugh = Agave involuta
- Manfreda jaliscana Rose = Agave jaliscana
- Manfreda justosierrana García-Mend., A.Castañeda & S.Franco = Agave justosierrana
- Manfreda littoralis García-Mend. = Agave littoralis
- Manfreda longibracteata Verh.-Will. = Agave longibracteata
- Manfreda longiflora (Rose) Verh.-Will. = Agave longiflora
- Manfreda maculata (Mart.) Rose = Agave stictata
- Manfreda maculosa (Hook.) Rose = Agave maculata
- Manfreda nanchititlensis Matuda = Agave nanchititlensis
- Manfreda occidentalis Art.Castro & Aarón Rodr.
- Manfreda paniculata L.Hern., R.A.Orellana & Carnevali = Agave paniculata
- Manfreda parva Aarón Rodr. = Agave parva
- Manfreda petskinil R.A.Orellana, L.Hern. & Carnevali = Agave petskinil
- Manfreda planifolia (S.Watson) Rose = Agave planifolia
- Manfreda potosina (B.L.Rob. & Greenm.) Rose = Agave potosina
- Manfreda pringlei Rose = Agave debilis
- Manfreda pubescens (Regel & Ortgies) Verh.-Will. ex Espejo & López-Ferr. = Agave pubescens
- Manfreda revoluta (Klotzsch) Rose = Agave revoluta
- Manfreda rubescens Rose = Agave pratensis
- Manfreda santana-michelii Art.Castro, Aarón Rodr. & P.Carrillo
- Manfreda scabra (Ortega) McVaugh = Agave scabra
- Manfreda sileri Verh.-Will. = Agave sileri
- Manfreda singuliflora (S.Watson) Rose = Agave singuliflora
- Manfreda umbrophila García-Mend. = Agave umbrophila
- Manfreda undulata (Klotzsch) Rose = Agave undulata
- Manfreda variegata (Jacobi) Rose = Agave variegata
- Manfreda verhoekiae García-Mend. = Agave verhoekiae
- Manfreda virginica (L.) Salisb. ex Rose = Agave virginica
