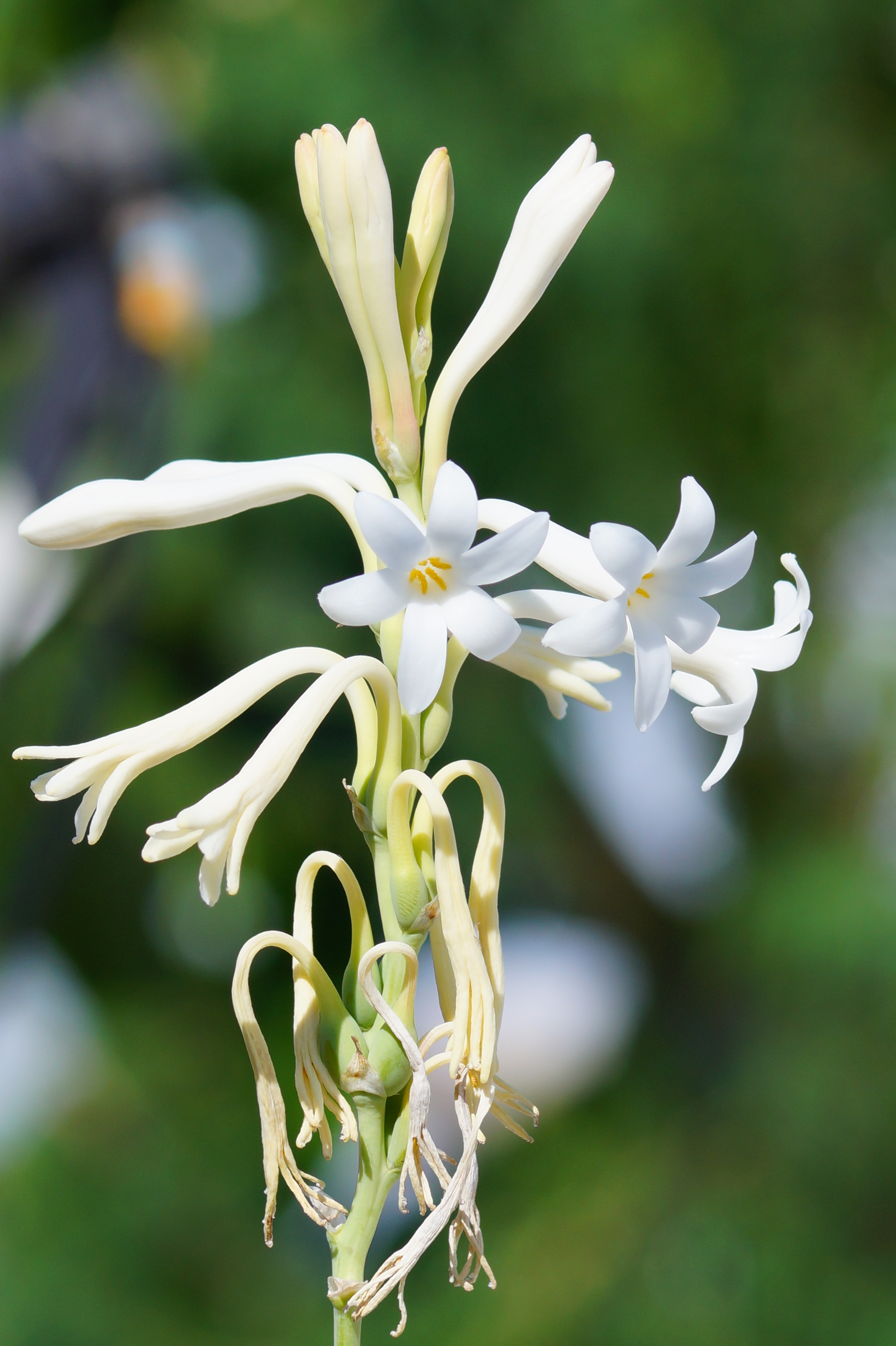

Scientific classification
- Kingdom: Plantae
- Clade: Tracheophytes
- Clade: Angiosperms
- Clade: Monocots
- Order: Asparagales
- Family: Asparagaceae
- Subfamily: Agavoideae
- Genus: Polianthes
- Species: P. tuberosa

Binomial name
- Polianthes tuberosa L.

Synonyms
- List: Agave amica (Medik.) Thiede & Govaerts; Agave polianthes Thiede & Eggli, nom. superfl.; Agave tuberosa (L.) Thiede & Eggli, nom. illeg.; Crinum angustifolium Houtt.; Polianthes gracilis Link; Polianthes tuberosa var. gracilis (Link) Beurl.; Polianthes tuberosa f. plena Moldenke; Tuberosa amica Medik.

= Polianthes tuberosa =

tuberose

Species of plant

Polianthes tuberosa, the tuberose, is a perennial plant in the family Asparagaceae, subfamily Agavoideae, extracts of which are used as a note in perfumery. Now widely grown as an ornamental plant, the species is native to Mexico.

== Etymology ==
The common name derives from the Latin tuberosa through French tubéreuse, meaning swollen or tuberous in reference to its root system.

== Description ==
The tuberose is herbaceous, growing from underground tubers or tuberous roots. It produces offsets. The leaves are a dull green and about 1–1.5 ft (30–50 cm) long and up to 0.5 in (13 mm) wide at the base. They are slightly succulent. The inflorescence is a spike, reaching up to 3 ft (1 m) high, with pure white waxy flowers. The flowers are tubular, with a tube up to 2.5 in (6 cm) long, separating into six flaring segments (tepals) at the end, and are strongly fragrant. There are six stamens, inserted into the tube of the flower, and a three-part stigma.

The double-flowered cultivar 'The Pearl' has broader and darker leaves, and shorter flower spikes, usually reaching only 1.5–2 ft (50–60 cm). Orange-flowered forms of the species have been reported. As well due to crossing with other species there are now yellow, pink, red and greenish forms.

== Taxonomy ==
The species was first described for science by Carl Linnaeus in 1753. In 1790, Friedrich Kasimir Medikus moved the species to the genus Tuberosa as Tuberosa amica. When morphological and molecular phylogenetic studies concluded that Polianthes is embedded within the larger genus Agave, the genus was included in a broadly circumscribed Agave. Two incorrect attempts were made to name the species when transferred to Agave. In 1999, Joachim Thiede and Urs Eggli published the name "Agave tuberosa". However, Philip Miller had published this name in 1768, for the species now called Furcraea tuberosa, so it could not be used again, and Thiede and Eggli's name is illegitimate. In 2001, Thiede and Eggli published a replacement name (nomen novum), "Agave polianthes". However, since Medikus's Tuberosa amica is considered to be a synonym of Polianthes tuberosa, its epithet is the second oldest and according to the International Code of Nomenclature for algae, fungi, and plants should be used when the older epithet is unavailable. Hence Thiede and Eggli's second name is superfluous, and the correct name for the species within Agave is Agave amica, as was explained by Thiede and Rafaël Govaerts when they published this combination in 2017.

In 2024 Vázquez-García et al. reinstated the genera Manfreda, Polianthes, and Prochnyanthes, which together form a distinct clade, and described the three new genera Echinoagave, Paraagave, and Paleoagave, to leave a monophyletic Agave sensu stricto.

== Distribution ==
The tuberose is believed to be native to central and southern Mexico. It is no longer found in the wild, probably as a result of being domesticated by the Aztecs. It is currently grown in many tropical and temperate countries. Polianthes tuberosa is the only one of the species in genus Polianthes in commercial cultivation.

== Uses ==
=== In perfumery ===
The overwhelming fragrance of the tuberose has been distilled for use in perfumery since the 17th century, when the flower was first transported to Europe. French Queen Marie Antoinette used a perfume called Sillage de la Reine, also called Parfum de Trianon, containing tuberose, orange blossom, sandalwood, jasmine, iris and cedar. It remains a popular floral note for perfumes, either in stand-alone Tuberose fragrances or mixed floral scents, but it generally must be used in moderation because the essence is overpowering and can become sickly to the wearer.

=== Others ===
In Indonesia, tuberose flowers are also used in cooking.

In Hawaii, they are one of the main flowers used in the construction of leis. Some others are plumerias, ginger, orchids, and pikake (jasmine).

== Cultivation ==
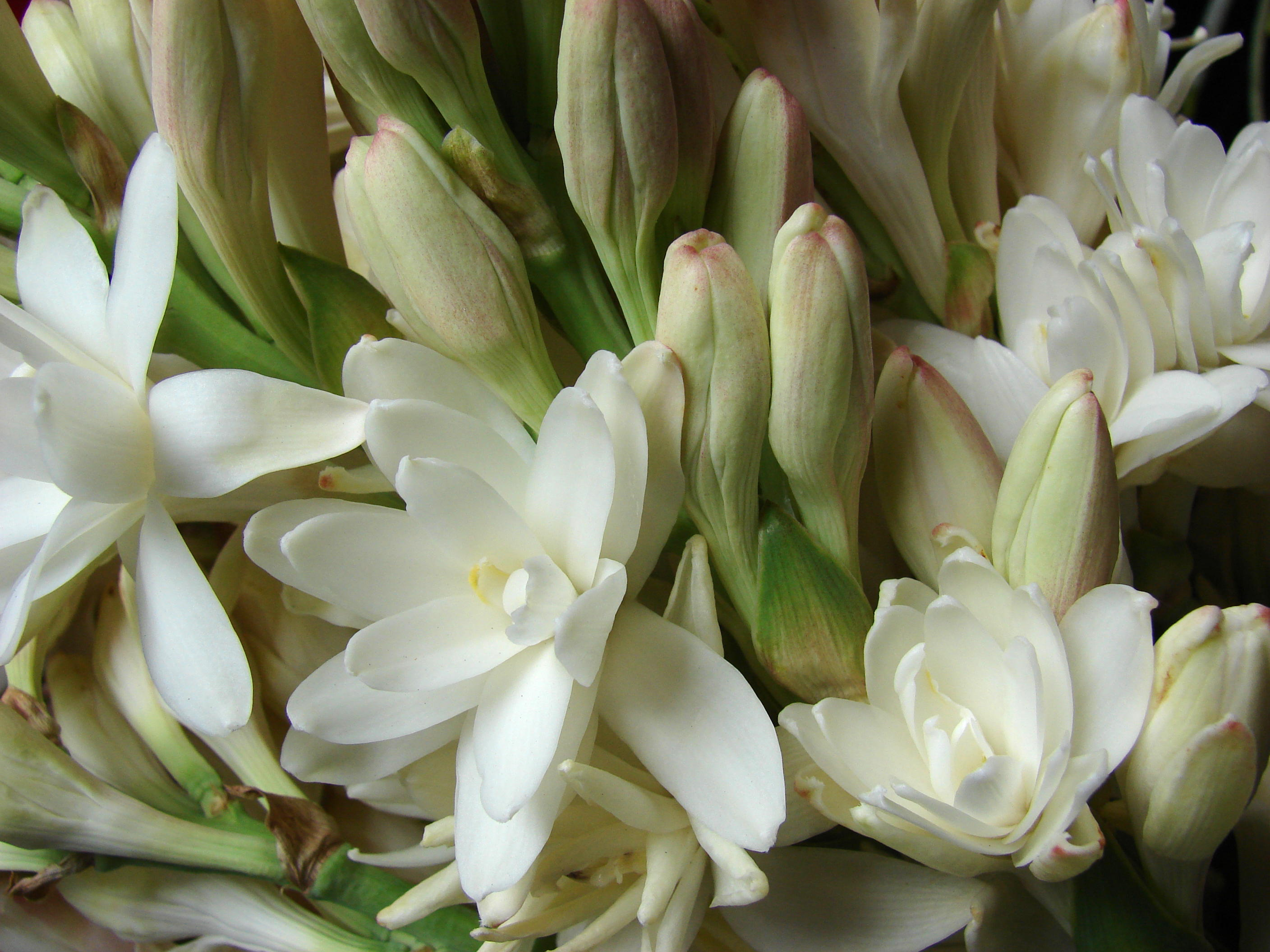
Flowers of the double-flowered cultivar 'The Pearl'

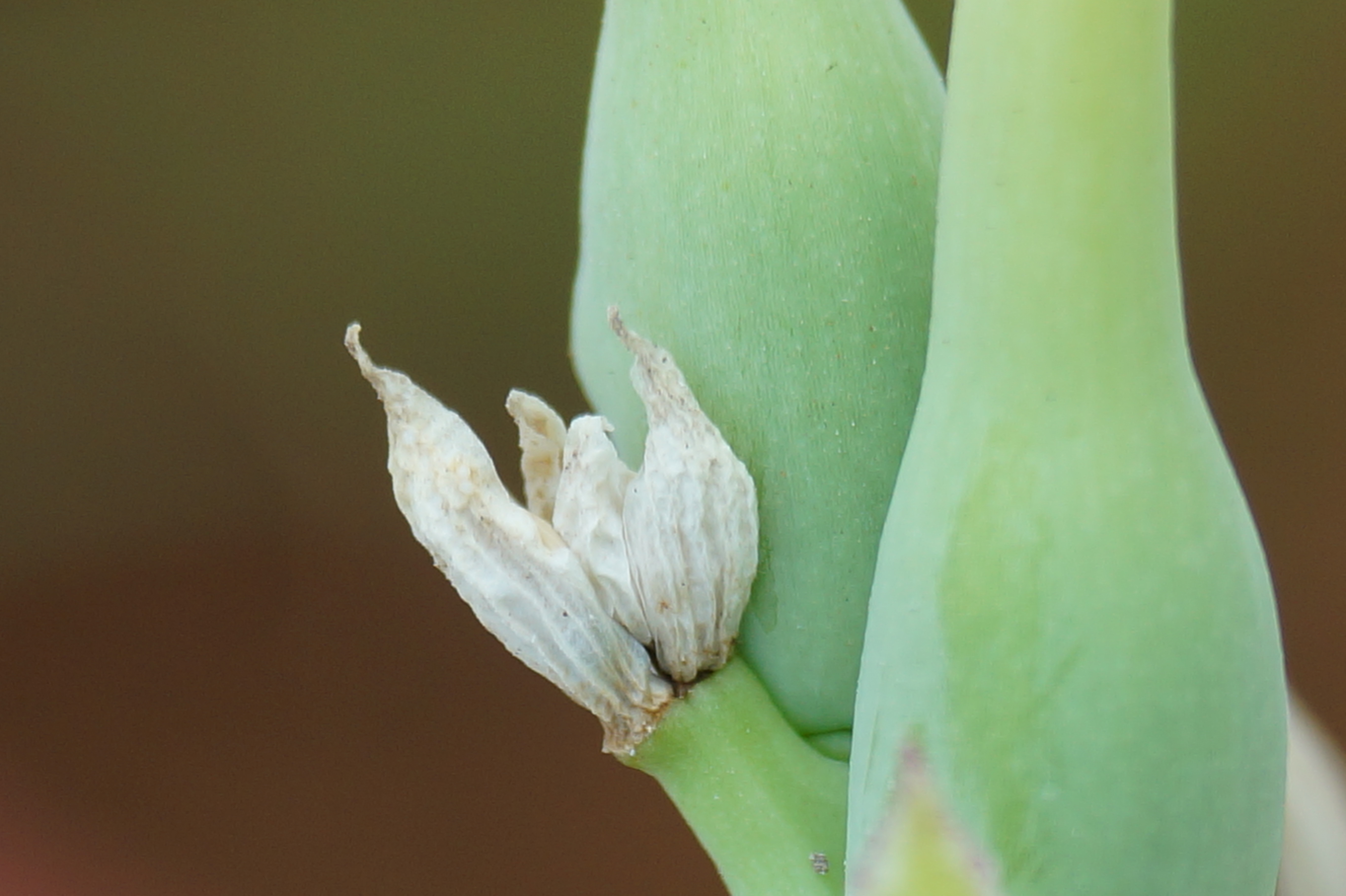
Tuberose seeds

Tuberoses can be overwintered outdoors in hardiness zones 8-10. In colder zones, tuberoses are grown as summer annuals, in pots or mixed-flower borders where they can be enjoyed for their scent. To flower the plants require around 4 months of warm temperatures from the time the rhizome is planted. Gardeners usually start the rhizomes in pots in greenhouses beginning in late-winter or early spring, moving them outdoors in late spring once frost danger has passed. If they are started directly in the ground at this time, they may not bloom until September, greatly reducing the period in which their blooms may be enjoyed. Once the foliage begins to yellow in October, the leaves should be clipped, the rhizomes dug and stored in a cool, dry and dark place for the winter.

The most popular variety is a double-flowered cultivar known as 'The Pearl' that grows to 2.5 ft (76 cm) tall and features pale pink buds opening to cream. The more common variety is called 'Mexican Single', which, although not as decorative as 'The Pearl', makes for a longer lasting cut flower.

Tuberoses were especially beloved by Louis XIV of France, who had them planted in the hundreds in the flower beds of the Grand Trianon at Versailles so that the scent was overpowering, which no doubt helped cover the smells from the poor sanitation of the palace. They were grown in clay pots and planted directly in the ground; to keep the perfume consistently strong new specimens were rotated in, sometimes daily.

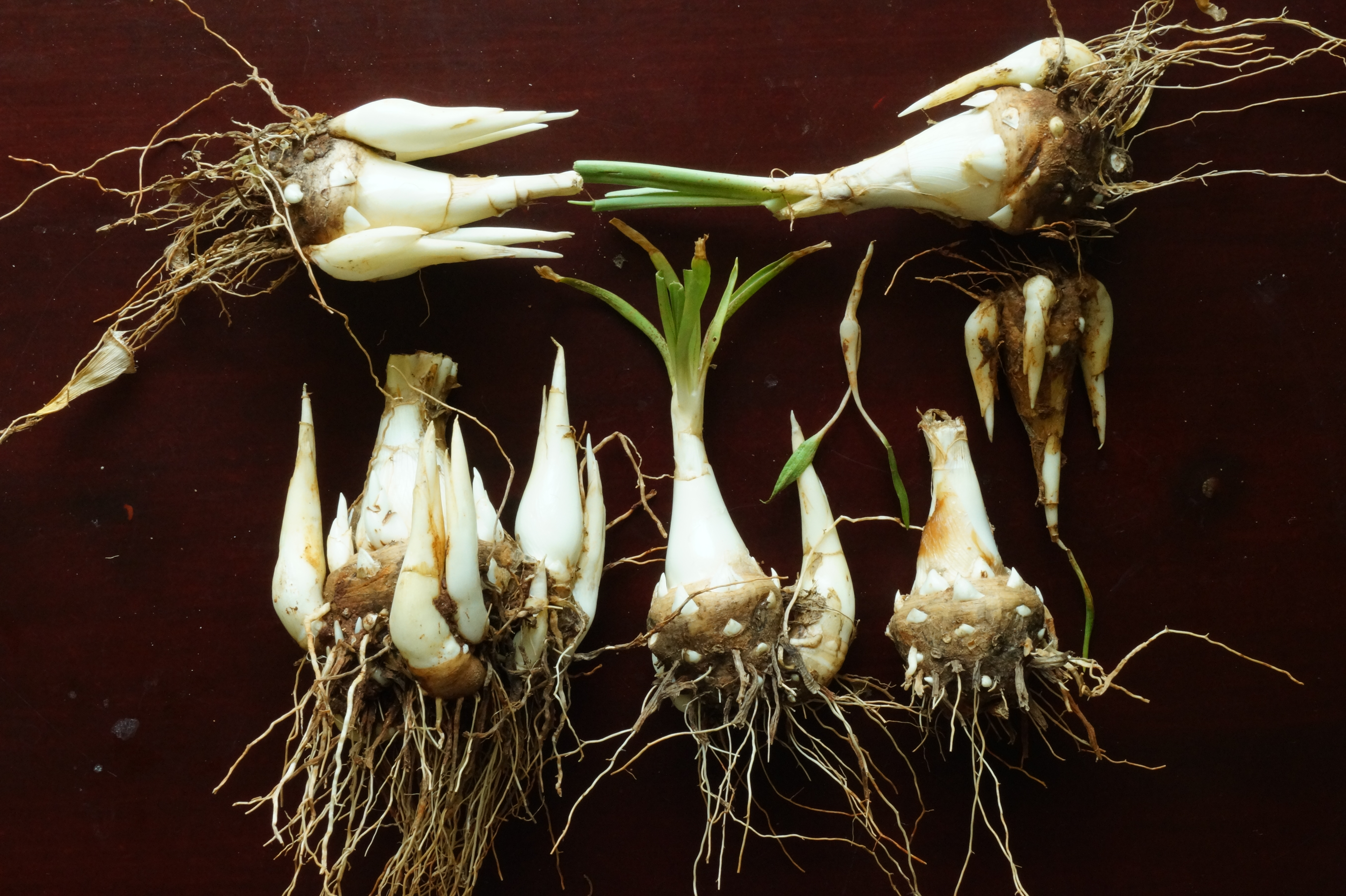
Tuberose bulbs taken out for seasonal replantation

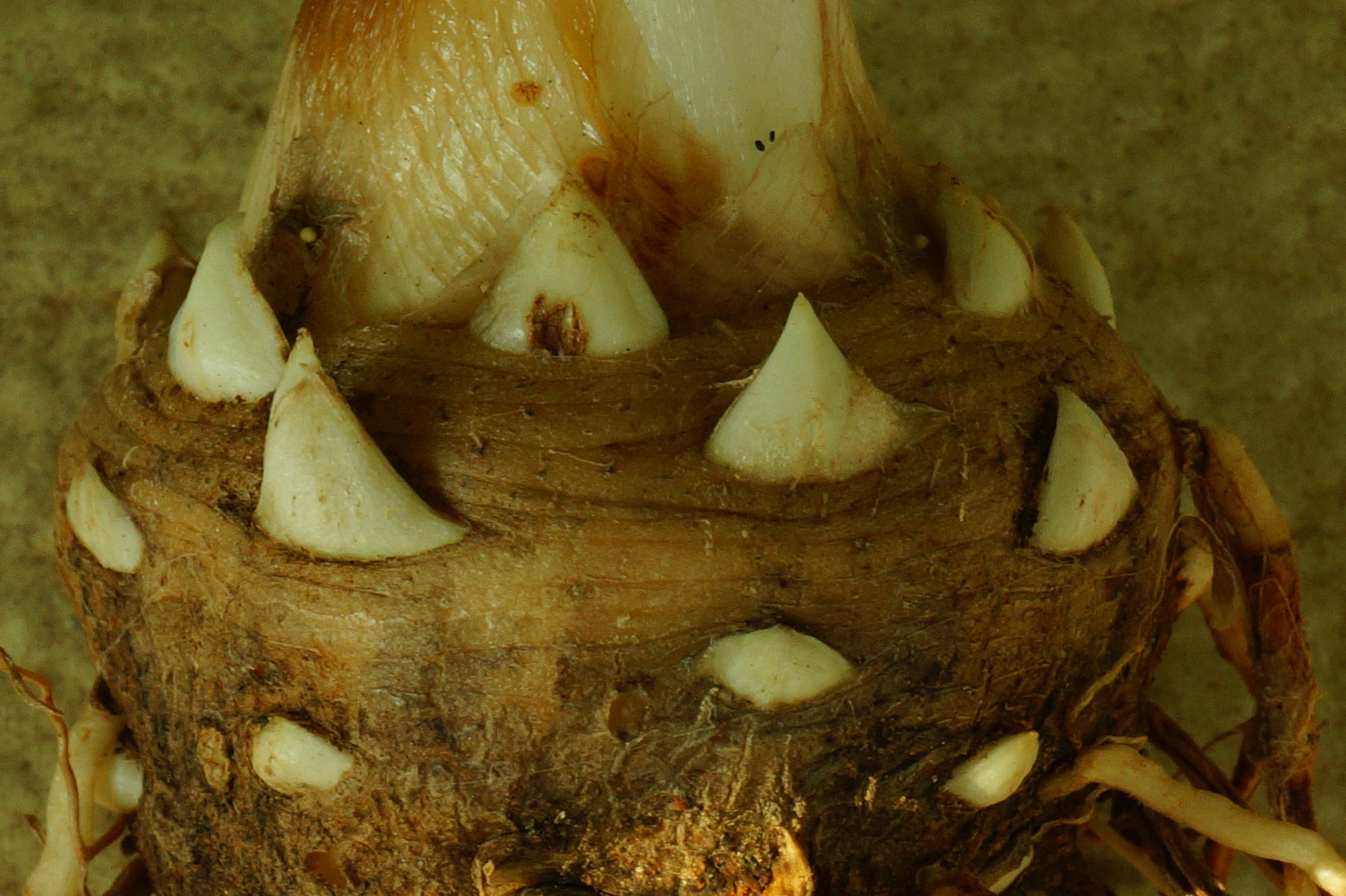
New shoots emerging from the bulbs of tuberose

== Cultural significance ==
In 1885, Oscar Wilde and the French poet Marc-André Raffalovich corresponded via letters in The Pall Mall Gazette on whether the name tuberose should be pronounced with two syllables (as 'tube rose') or three. Raffalovich stressed that its derivation from Latin tuberosa, meaning 'knobbly-rooted', meant the latter was correct. Wilde responded defending the flower's beauty:

I am deeply distressed to hear that tuberose is so called from its being a 'lumpy flower'. It is not at all lumpy, and, even if it were, no poet should be heartless enough to say so. Henceforth there really must be two derivations for every word, one for the poet and one for the scientist. And in the present case the poet will dwell on the tiny trumpets of ivory into which the white flower breaks, and leave to the man of science horrid allusions to its supposed lumpiness and indiscreet revelations of its private life below ground.

== Gallery ==
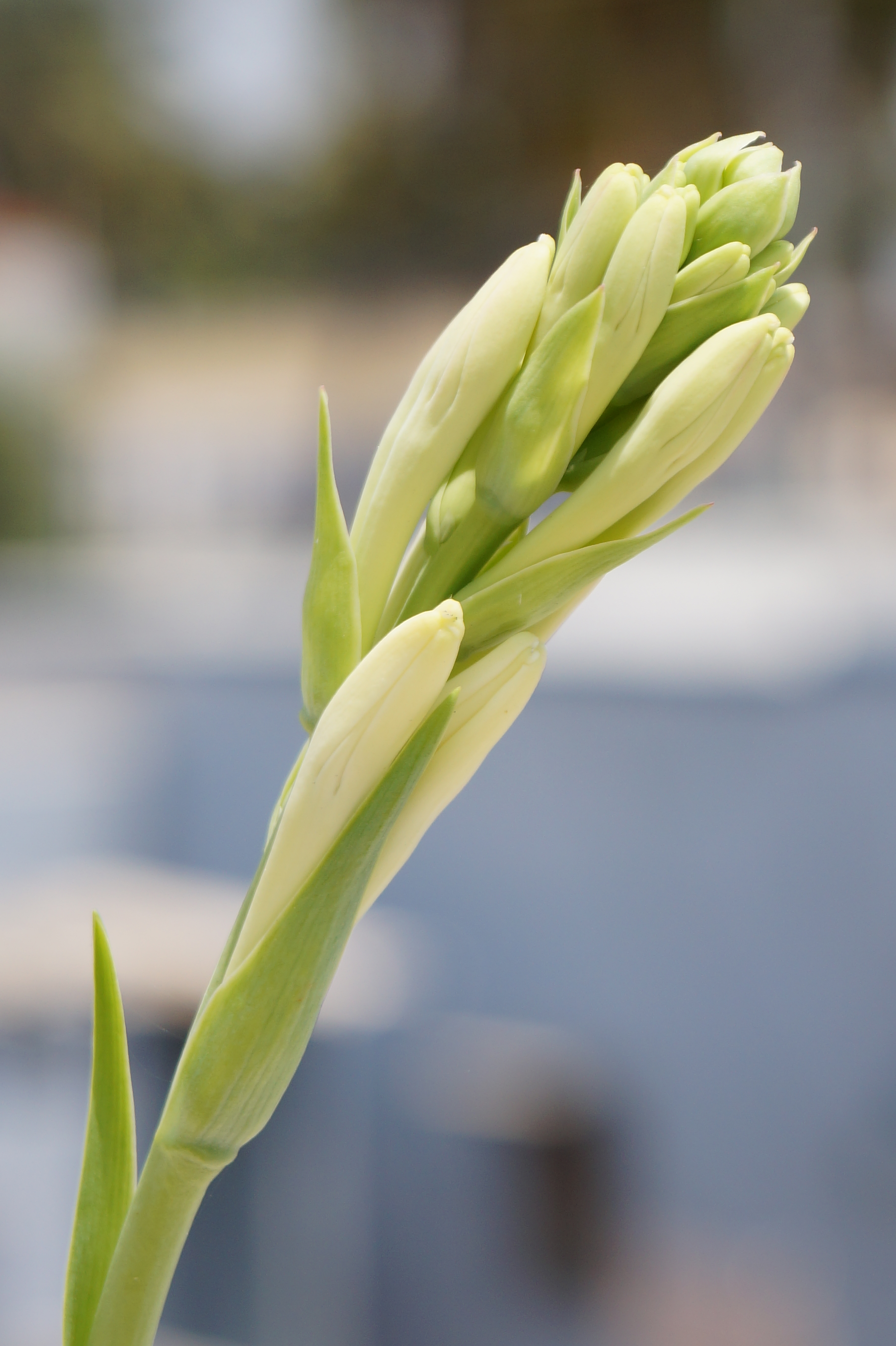
Buds

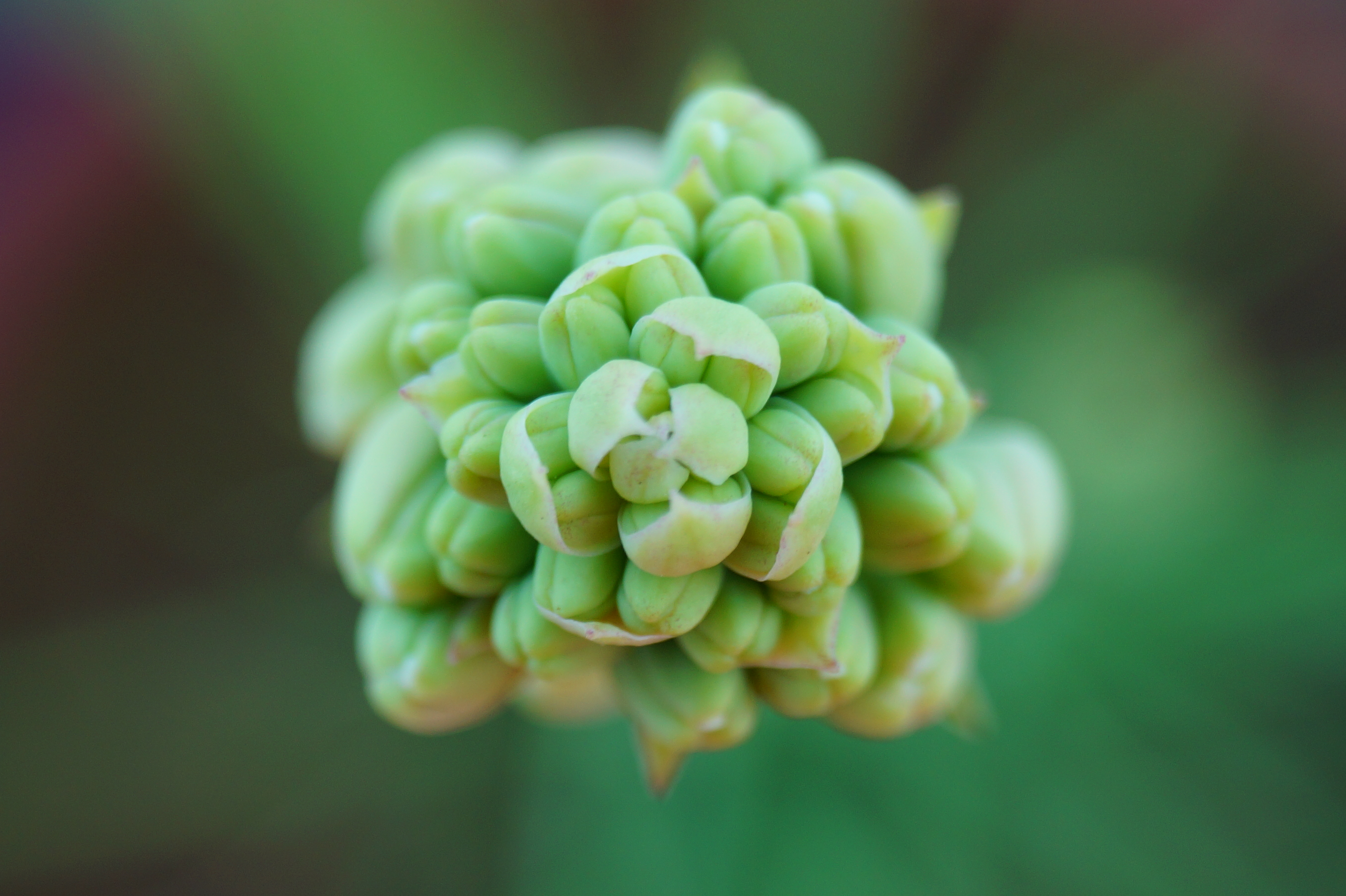
Top view of buds before blooming

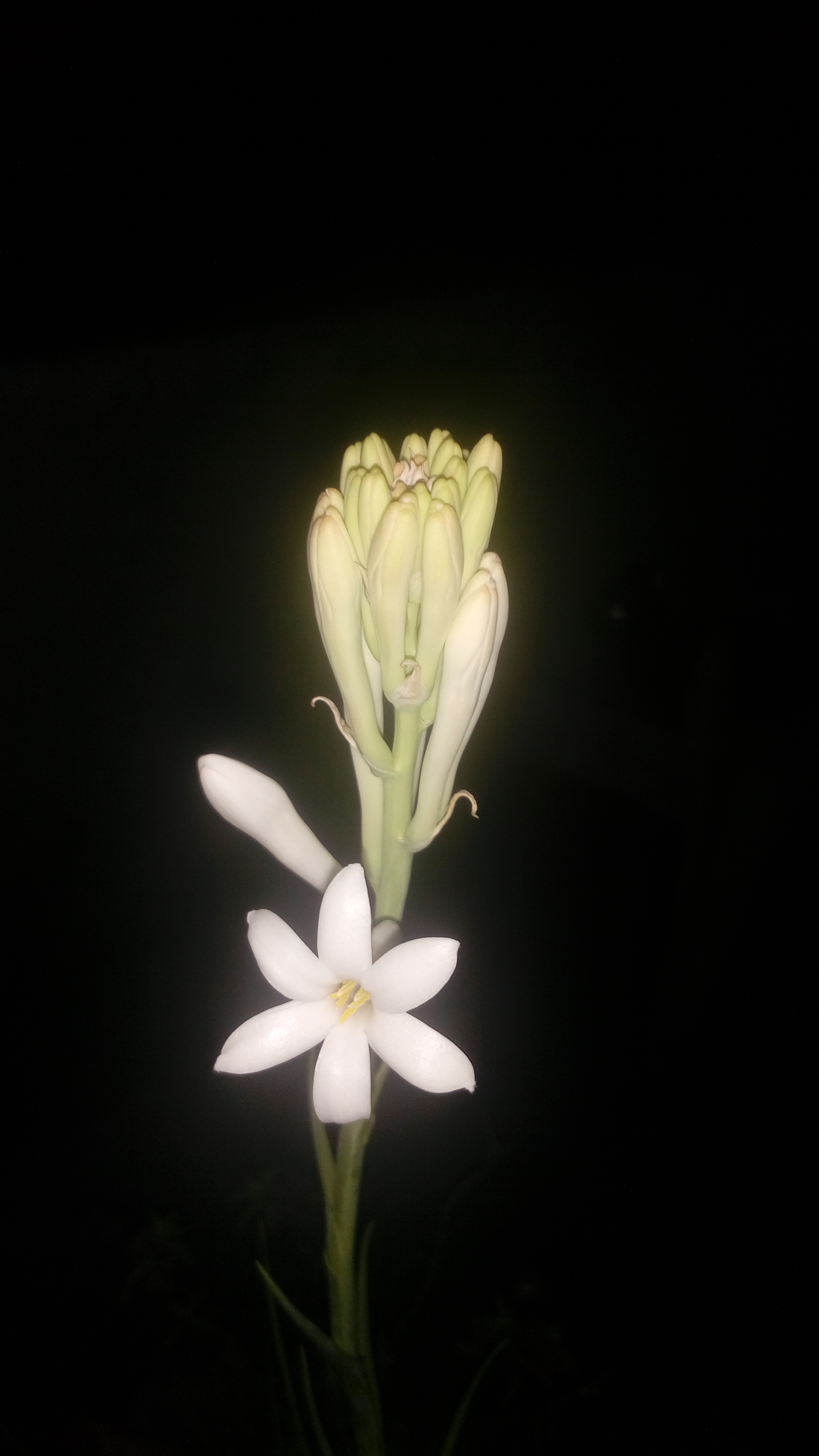
Night view of the flower

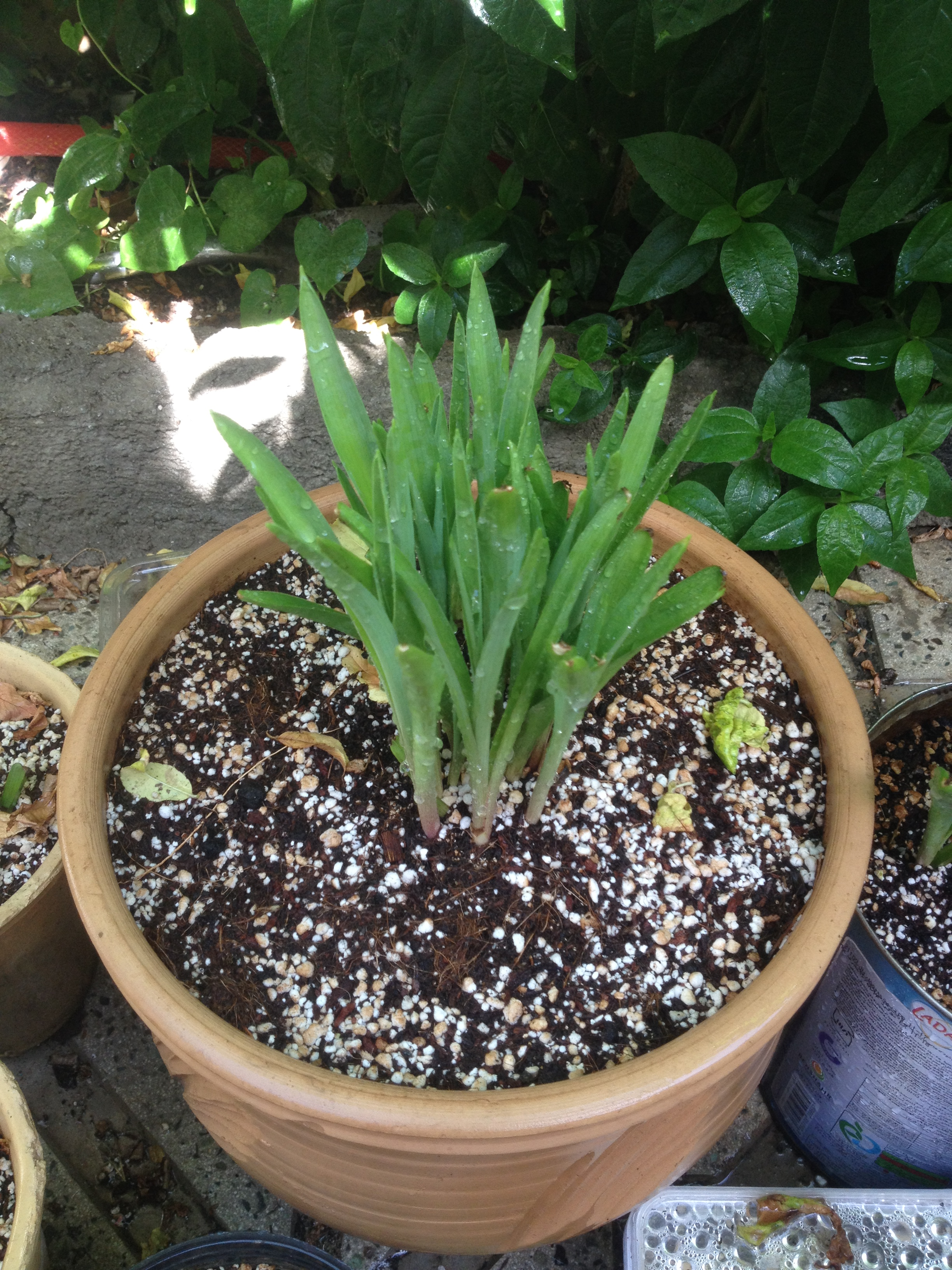
Condition after about 3 weeks
