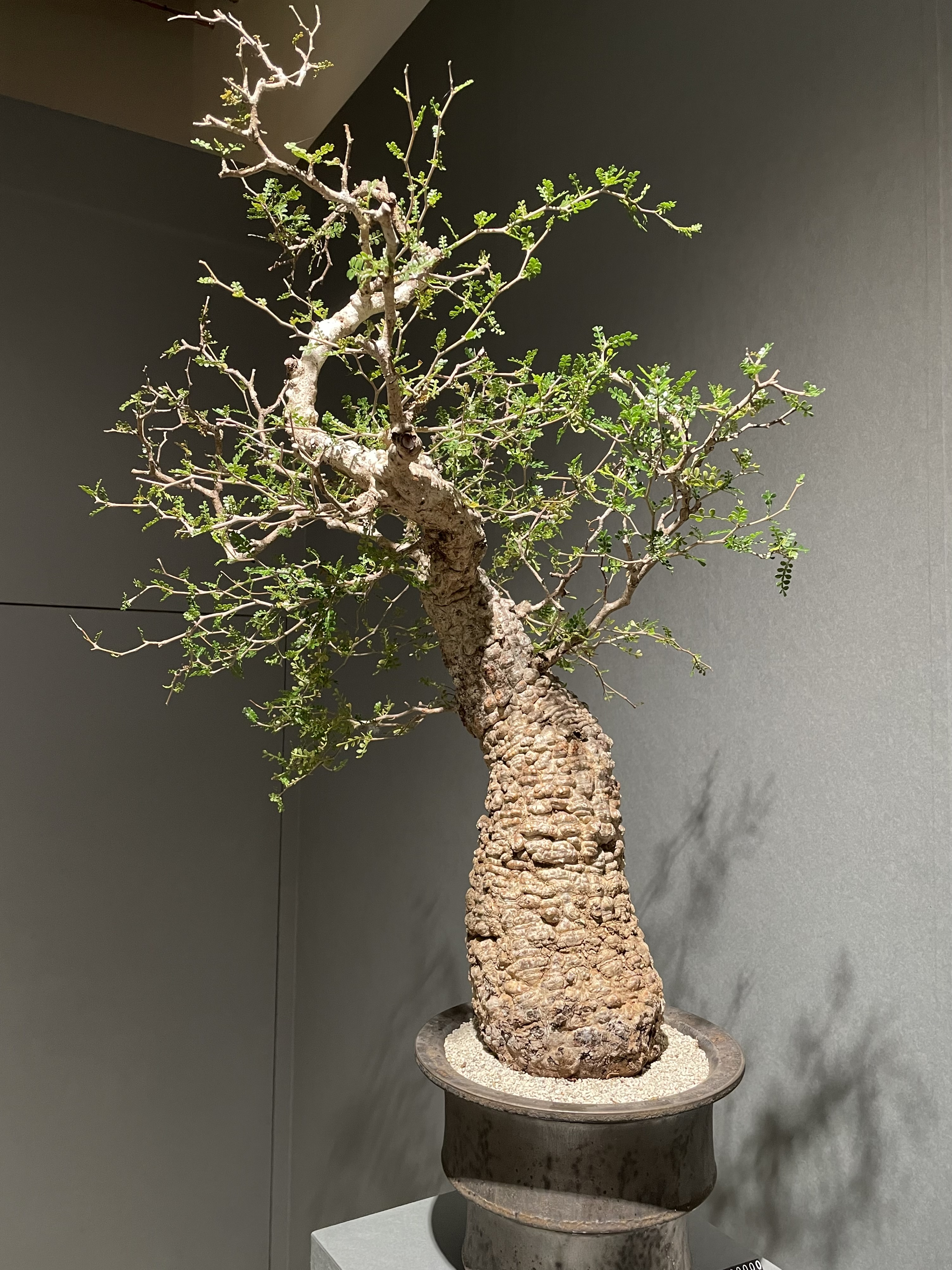

Conservation status
- Endangered (IUCN 3.1)

Scientific classification
- Kingdom: Plantae
- Clade: Tracheophytes
- Clade: Angiosperms
- Clade: Eudicots
- Clade: Rosids
- Order: Sapindales
- Family: Anacardiaceae
- Genus: Operculicarya
- Species: O. pachypus

Binomial name
- Operculicarya pachypus Eggli

= Operculicarya pachypus =

Species of flowering plant

Operculicarya pachypus, also known as elephant bush, is a species of Operculicarya native to Madagascar.
