= Bad Hair Day (disambiguation) =

Bad Hair Day is a 1996 album by "Weird Al" Yankovic.

Bad Hair Day may also refer to:

== Television and film ==
- "Bad Hare Day" (Brandy & Mr. Whiskers), a television episode of Brandy & Mr. Whiskers
- "Bad Hare Day" (Ruby Gloom), a television episode of Ruby Gloom
- "Bad Hair Day" (Courage the Cowardly Dog), a television episode of Courage the Cowardly Dog
- "Bad Hair Day" (Modern Family), a television episode of Modern Family
- "Bad Hair Day" (Sailor Moon), a television episode of Sailor Moon
- Bad Hair Day (2015 film), a Disney television movie
- Bad Hair Day (2024 film), a Spanish comedy film
- "Bad Hair Day", an episode of season 3 of Phineas and Ferb
- "Bad Hair Day", an episode of Donkey Kong Country

== Other uses ==
- Agave 'Bad Hair Day', a variety of Mangave

== See also ==
- Bad Hair (disambiguation)
- Bad Hare Day, a Goosebumps book
