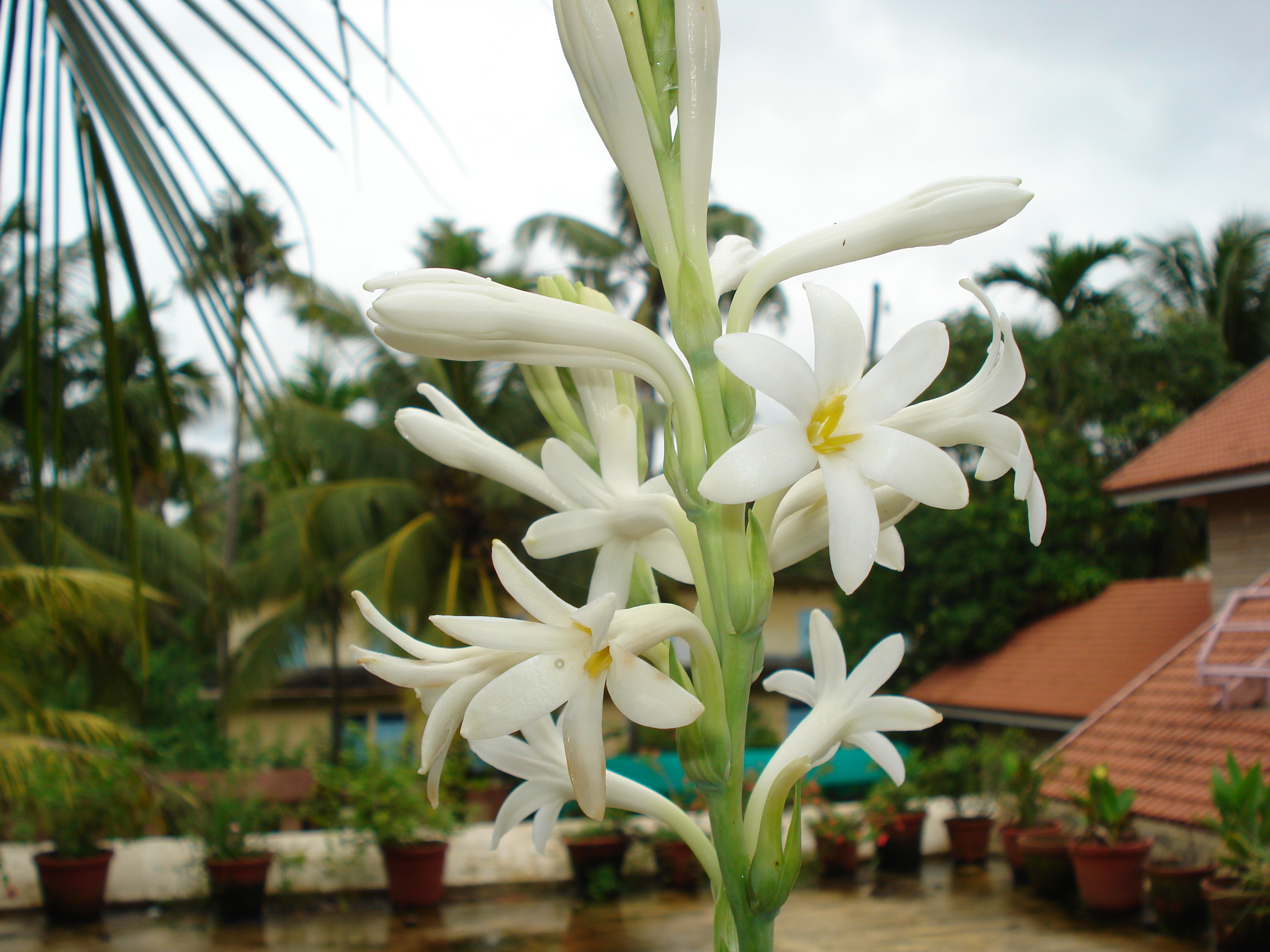
- Polianthes tuberosa

Scientific classification
- Kingdom: Plantae
- Clade: Tracheophytes
- Clade: Angiosperms
- Clade: Monocots
- Order: Asparagales
- Family: Asparagaceae
- Subfamily: Agavoideae
- Genus: Polianthes; L.

Synonyms
- × Bravanthes Cif. & Giacom.; Bravoa Lex.; Coetocapnia Link & Otto; Pothos Adans.; Pseudobravoa Rose; Robynsia Drapiez; Tuberosa Heist. ex Fabr.; Zetocapnia Link & Otto

= Polianthes =

Genus of flowering plants

Polianthes /ˌpɒliˈænθiːz/ is a genus of flowering plants in family Asparagaceae. It includes 23 species native to Mexico. One of its species is the tuberose, Polianthes tuberosa, a plant that is commonly used in perfume making.

== Taxonomy ==
Polianthes and close relatives have long presented significant taxonomic difficulty. With the advent of DNA sequencing, new karyologic and evolutionary phylogenetic studies showed that Polianthes, along with Manfreda and Prochnyanthes, were genetically nested within the traditional circumscription of Agave, rendering that genus paraphyletic. Early in the 21st century, these new phylogenetic results led to a reclassification of to include Polianthes, Manfreda and Prochnyanthes together as Agave subgenus Manfreda.

There was reaction against the changes from those who noted that the large morphological differences between the genera in this new Agave s.l. making them "counter-intuitive from a horticultural point of view". Polianthes morphologically differs from the classic Agave description in that they are deciduous with narrow leaves and no spines. Mexican taxonomists have continued to adhere to the traditional classifications and have published new species of Polianthes. Thus, based on a wider consideration of previously established genetic, morphological, and estimated genetic divergence times, Vázquez-García et al. proposed a narrower circumscription of Agave, paving the way for a reconsideration of Polianthes as a genus.

== Species ==
23 species are accepted.

- Polianthes aarodriguezii Art.Castro
- Polianthes alboaustralis E.Solano & Ríos-Gómez
- Polianthes bicolor E.Solano, Camacho & García-Mend.
- Polianthes cernua Art.Castro, J.G.González & Aarón Rodr.
- Polianthes densiflora (B.L.Rob. & Fernald) Shinners
- Polianthes elongata Rose
- Polianthes geminiflora (Lex.) Rose
- Polianthes graminifolia Rose
- Polianthes howardii Verh.-Will.
- Polianthes longiflora Rose
- Polianthes michoacana M.Cedano, Delgad. & Enciso
- Polianthes montana Rose
- Polianthes multicolor E.Solano & Dávila
- Polianthes nelsonii Rose
- Polianthes oaxacana García-Mend. & E.Solano
- Polianthes palustris Rose
- Polianthes platyphylla Rose
- Polianthes pringlei Rose
- Polianthes quilae Art.Castro & Aarón Rodr.
- Polianthes sessiliflora (Hemsl.) Rose
- Polianthes tuberosa L.
- Polianthes venustuliflora E.Solano, García-Mend. & Ríos-Gómez
- Polianthes zapopanensis E.Solano & Ríos-Gómez
