= Manfreda undulata =

- "Cherry Chocolate Chip" cultivar

Scientific classification
- Kingdom: Plantae
- Clade: Tracheophytes
- Clade: Angiosperms
- Clade: Monocots
- Order: Asparagales
- Family: Asparagaceae
- Subfamily: Agavoideae
- Genus: Manfreda
- Species: M. undulata

Binomial name
- Manfreda undulata (Klotzsch) Rose

Synonyms
- Agave undulata Klotzsch; Agave drimiifolia Baker

Species of flowering plant

Manfreda undulata is a species of tuberose natively found in Tamaulipas. It grows best in a subtropical climate. It is not considered invasive. This species includes the popular houseplant and garden cultivar commonly known as the Cherry Chocolate Chip.

== Description ==
Manfreda undulata displays leaves that are distinctly wavy with sharp tips. The leaf colors range in shades of green, brown, and red. Ituses a geophyte system, allowing it to survive mild to moderate winters. The plant is also rhizomatous. The species is polycarpic, flowering multiple times before dying.
