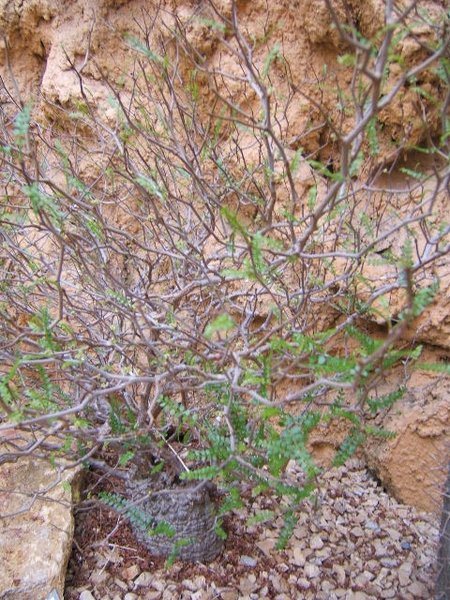

Conservation status
- Least Concern (IUCN 3.1)
- CITES Appendix II

Scientific classification
- Kingdom: Plantae
- Clade: Tracheophytes
- Clade: Angiosperms
- Clade: Eudicots
- Clade: Rosids
- Order: Sapindales
- Family: Anacardiaceae
- Genus: Operculicarya
- Species: O. decaryi

Binomial name
- Operculicarya decaryi H.Perrier

= Operculicarya decaryi =

Species of tree

Operculicarya decaryi, known as elephant tree or jabily, is a thick stemmed succulent plant species in the family Anacardiaceae, named after the botanical collector Raymond Decary. It is found in Madagascar and is also grown as a bonsai tree.

It has small (less than 2 mm) red flowers in winter. The inflorescence is at the end of short branches and often consist of about five flowers. Woody cuttings need a soil mixture kept uniformly moist for propagation. It can also be propagated using pieces of the tuberous roots.

It is drought tolerant and does well in full sun in most places. It cannot tolerate freezing conditions.
