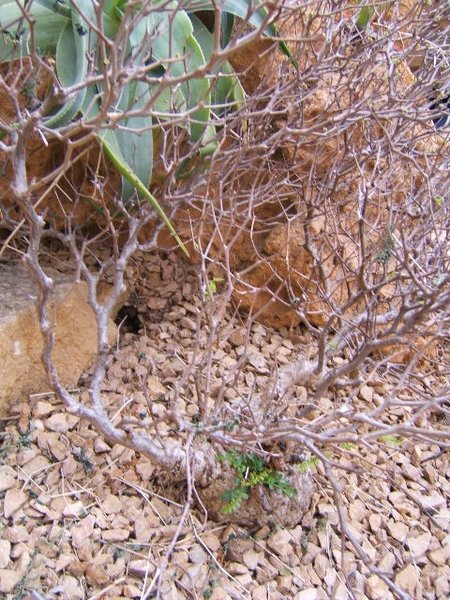
- Operculicarya decaryi
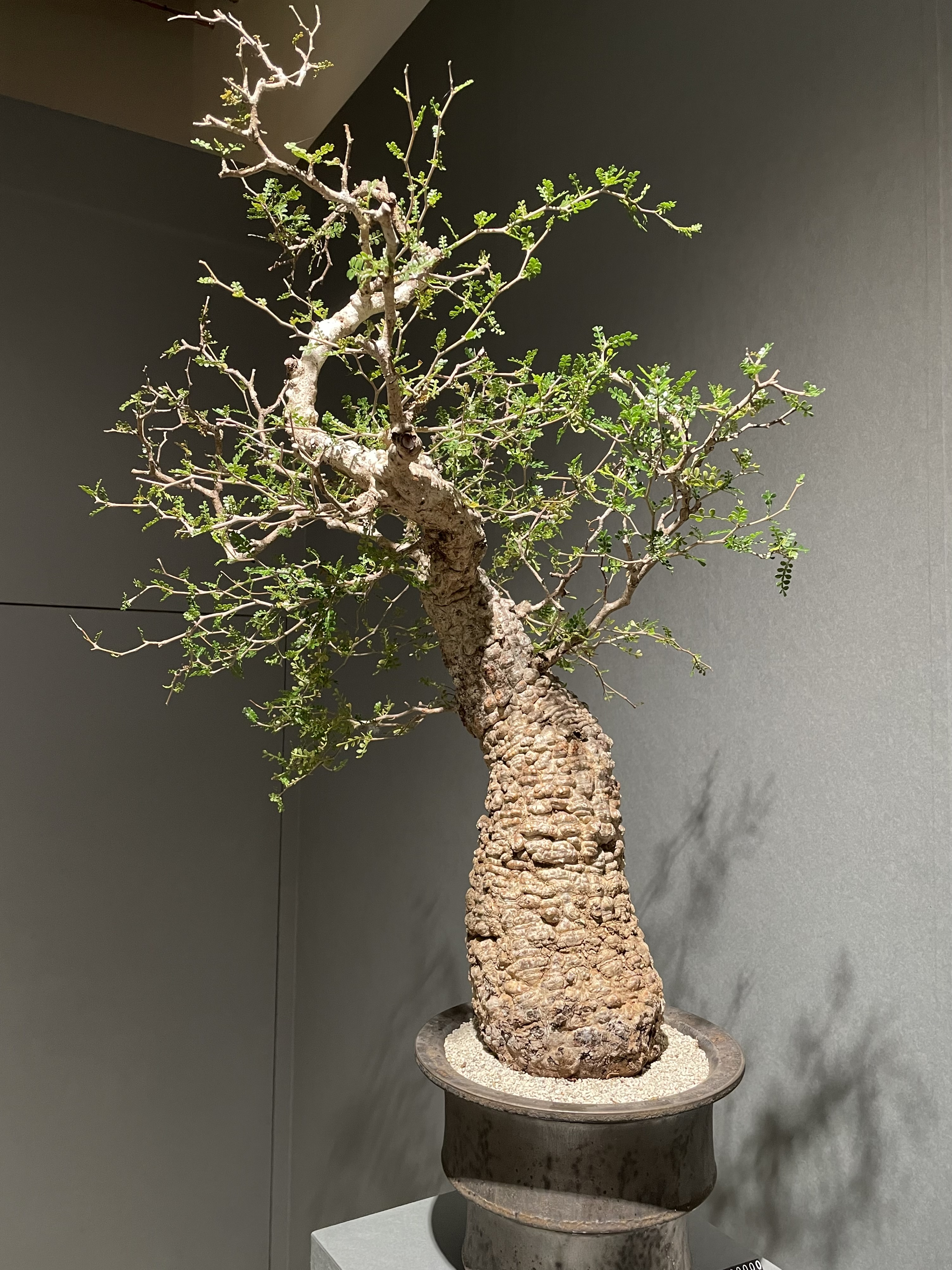
- Operculicarya pachypus

Scientific classification
- Kingdom: Plantae
- Clade: Tracheophytes
- Clade: Angiosperms
- Clade: Eudicots
- Clade: Rosids
- Order: Sapindales
- Family: Anacardiaceae
- Subfamily: Spondiadoideae
- Genus: Operculicarya; H.Perrier

Species
- Operculicarya borealis; Operculicarya decaryi; Operculicarya gummifera; Operculicarya hirsutissima; Operculicarya hyphaenoides; Operculicarya pachypus

= Operculicarya =

Genus of plants

Operculicarya (also Operculicaria) is a plant genus in the family Anacardiaceae, native to Madagascar, the Comoro Islands, and Aldabra. They are small dioecious pachycaul trees which mainly grow in dry, rocky areas.

== Taxonomy ==
=== Species ===
As of July 2020, Plants of the World online has 8 accepted species:

- Operculicarya borealis Eggli
- Operculicarya calcicola Randrian. & Lowry
- Operculicarya capuronii Randrian. & Lowry
- Operculicarya decaryi H.Perrier
- Operculicarya hirsutissima Eggli
- Operculicarya hyphaenoides H.Perrier
- Operculicarya multijuga Randrian. & Lowry
- Operculicarya pachypus Eggli

== Gallery ==
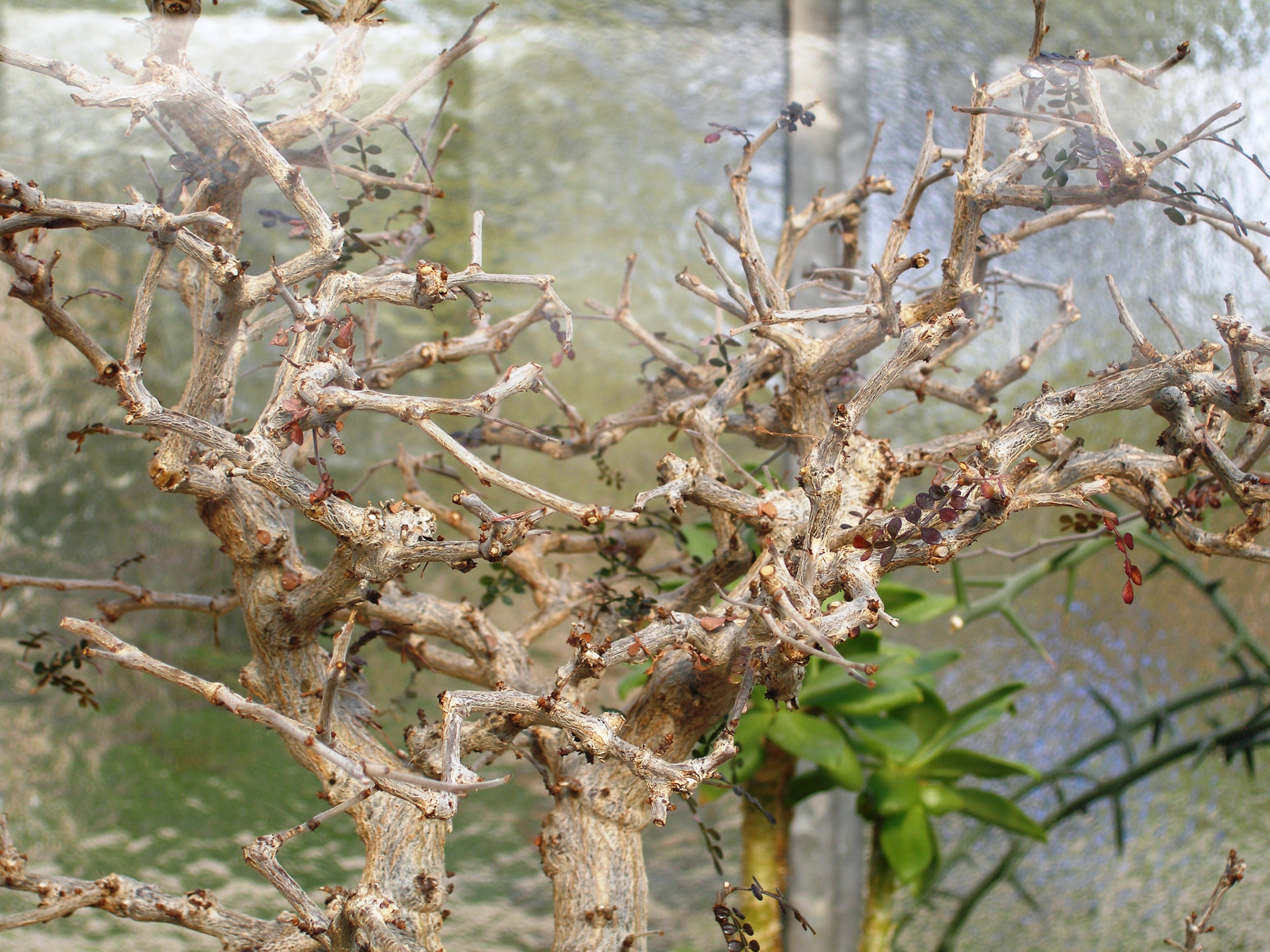

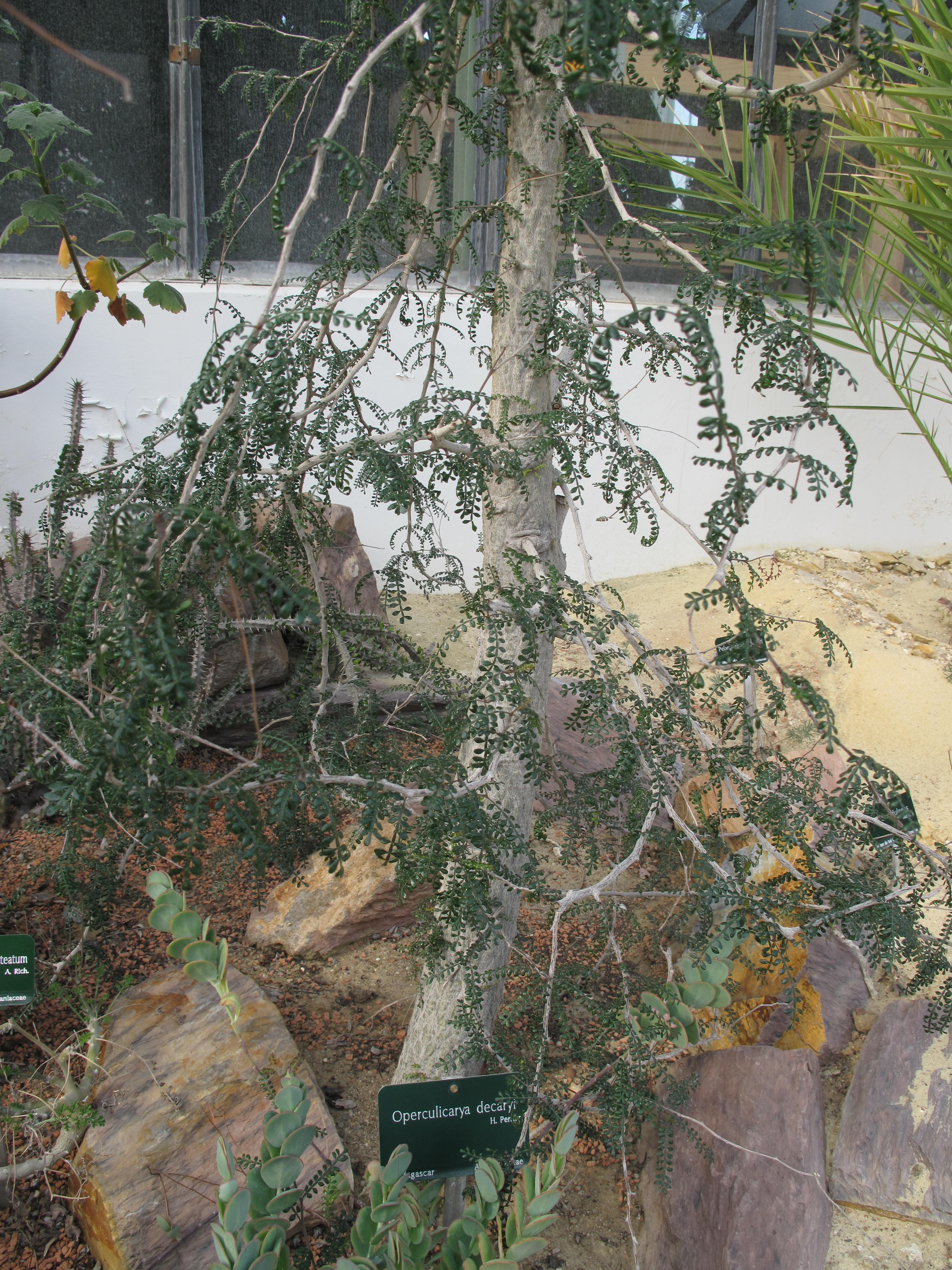

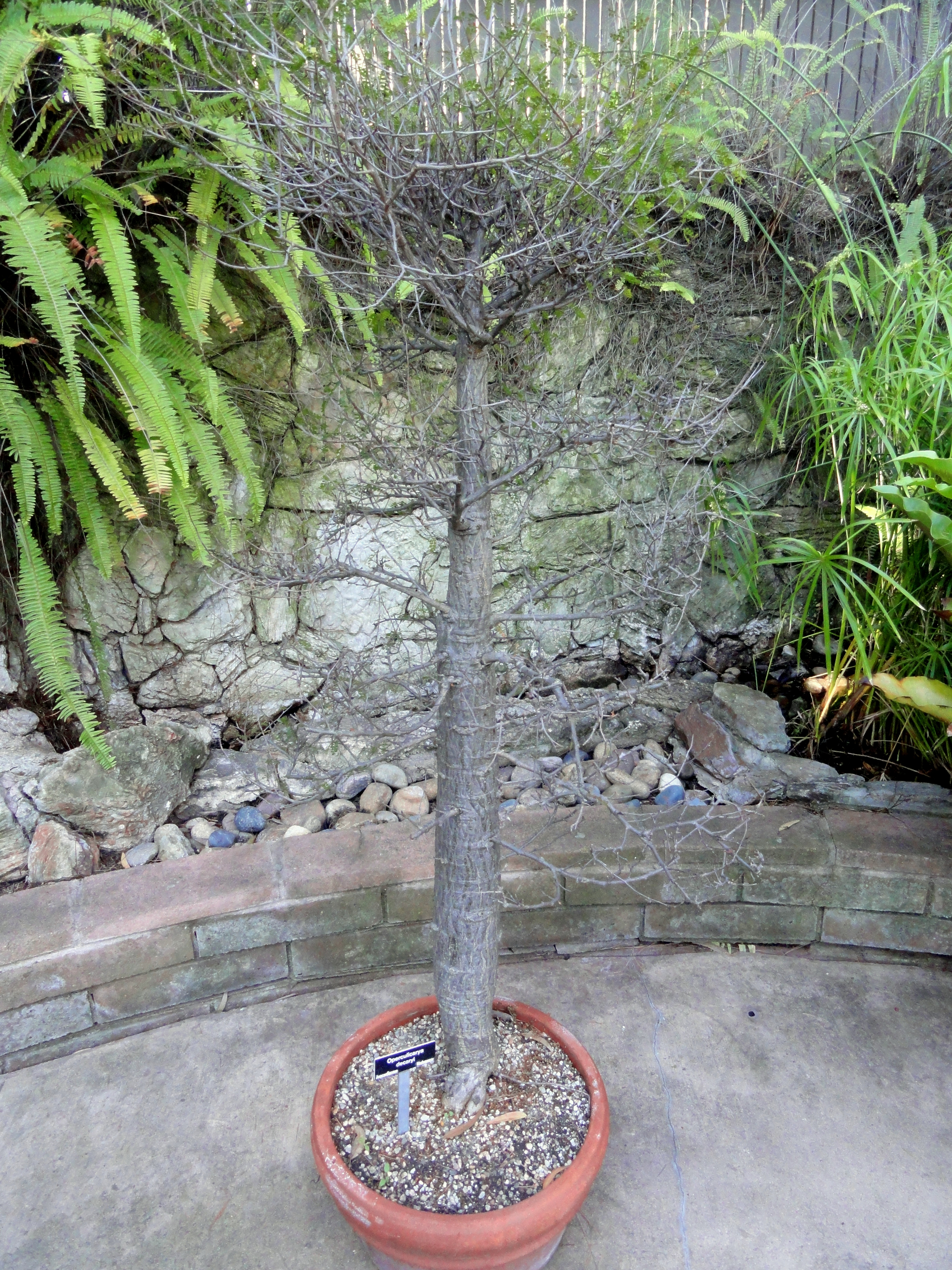

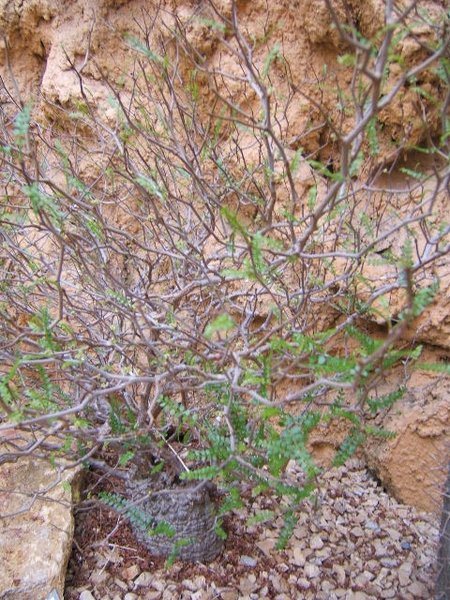

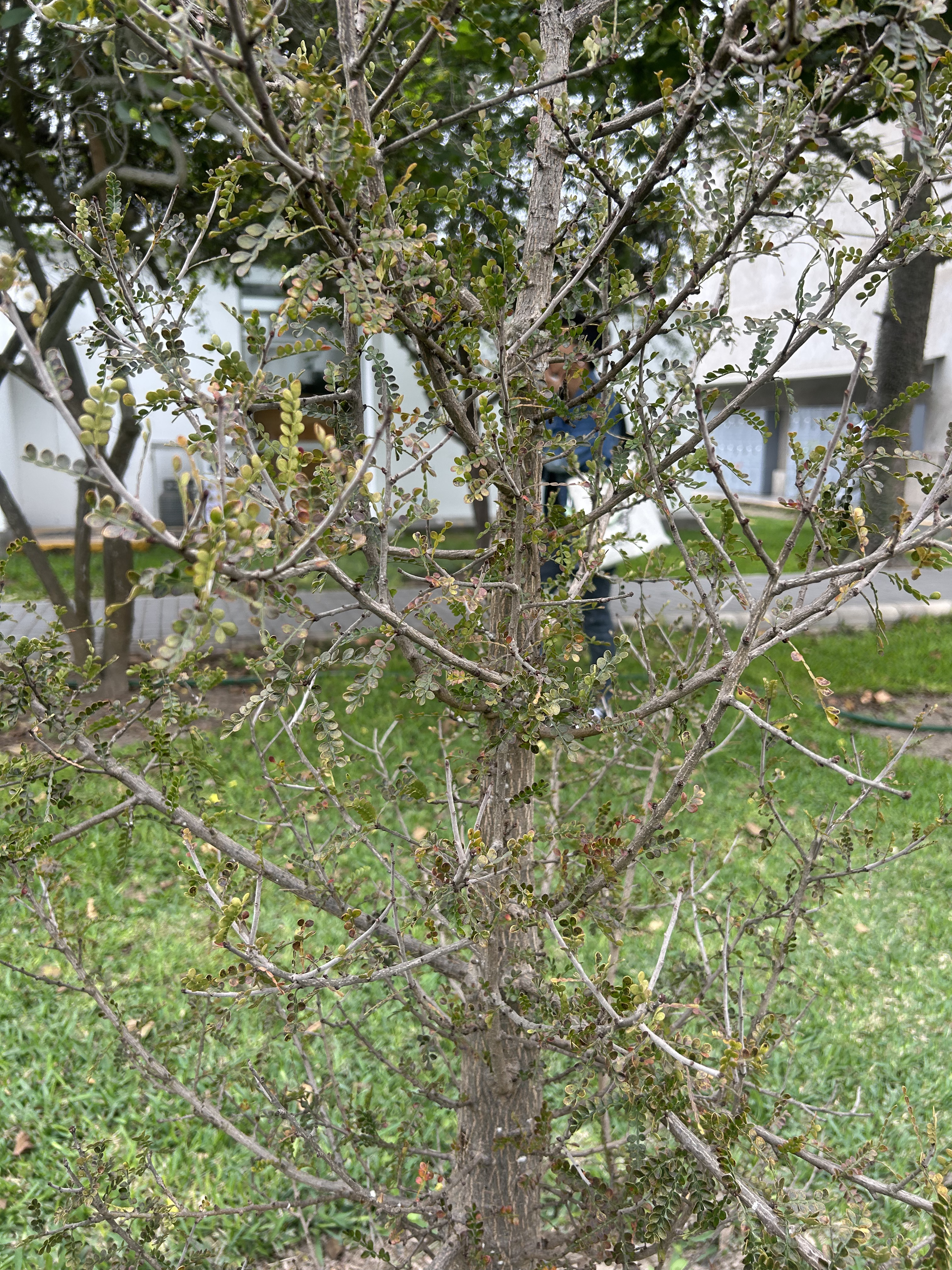

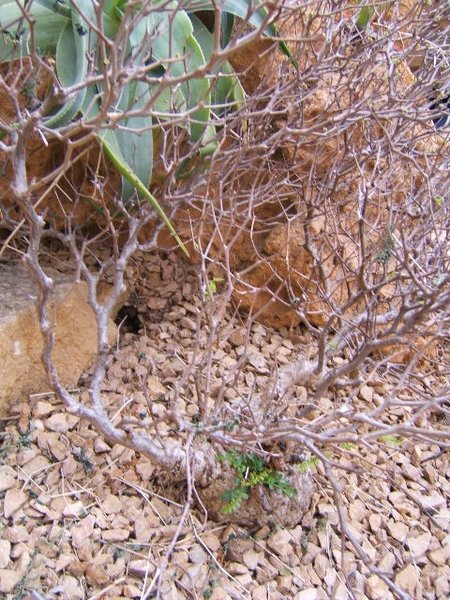

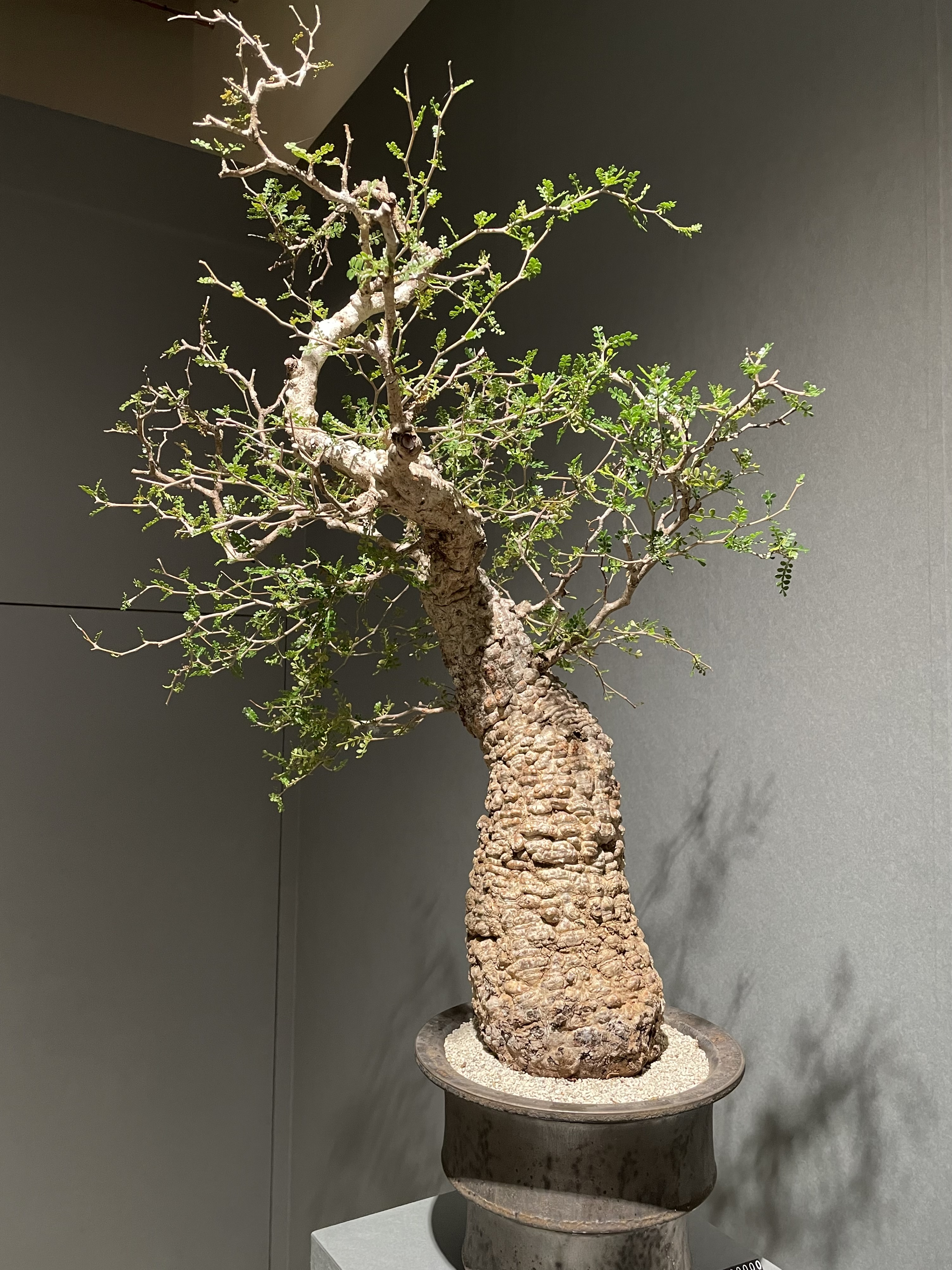
