= Mangave =

Genus of flowering plants

Mangaves
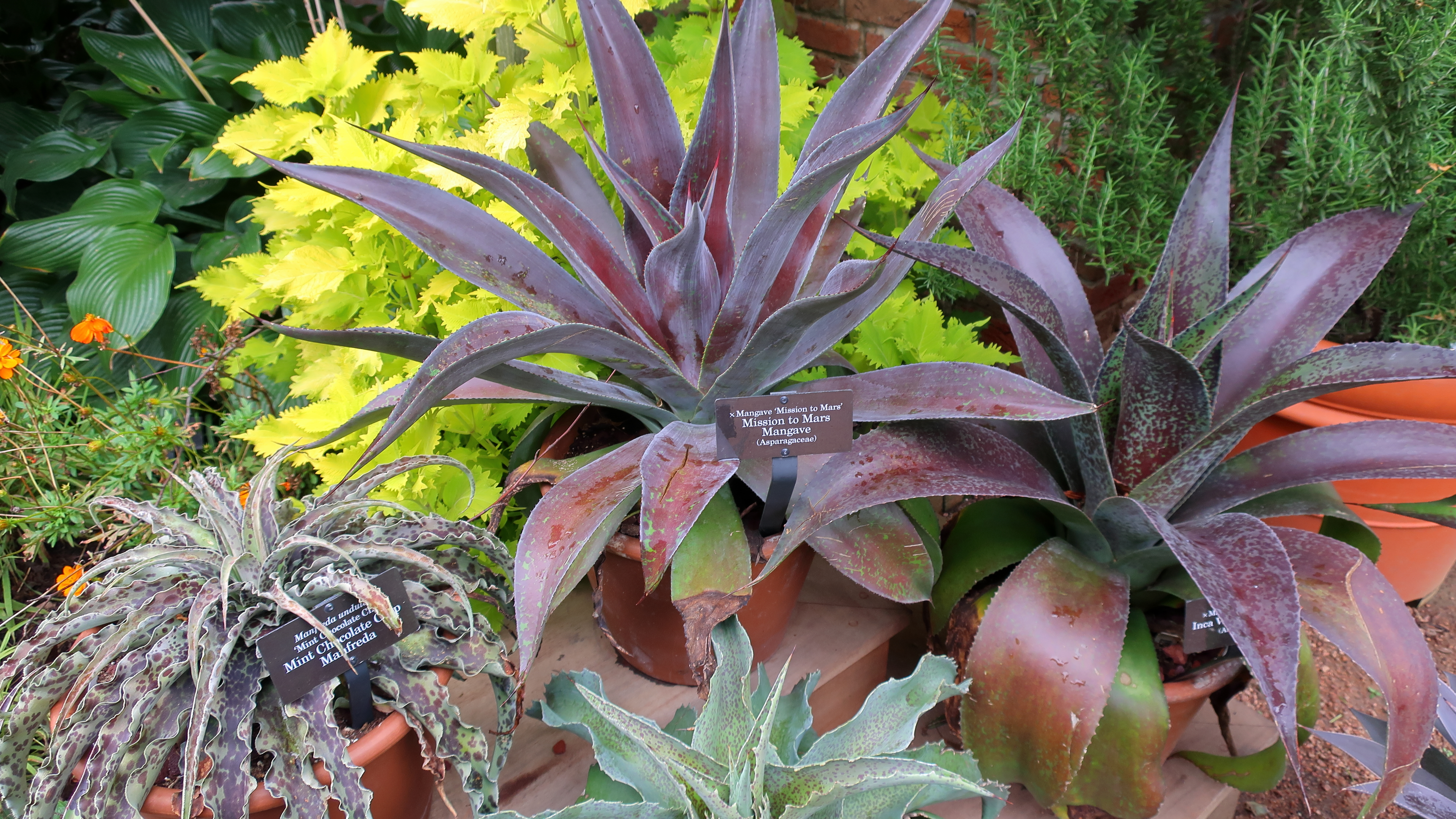
- Mangave cultivars in the Chicago Botanic Garden
- Genus: Agave
- Cultivar group: mangaves (informal name)

Mangaves are plants formerly given the nothogenus name × Mangave. They are derived from hybridizing species in the genus Agave and the former genus Manfreda. Manfreda is now included in Agave, so the scientific name is obsolete. Mangaves are often employed as ornamental plants in dry environments, as they possess traits of durability found in both parents. Around 30–40 cultivars were available as of 2020.

== Development ==
The name × Mangave was first coined in 2005 by Tony Avent of Plant Delights Nursery and Carl Schoenfeld and Wade Roitsch of Yucca Do Nursery to describe two plants growing at Yucca Do Nursery in Hempstead, Texas. The plants originated from seed collected as Manfreda in the wild in Northern Mexico that were growing adjacent to plants of Agave mitis (A. celsii). Only two seedlings from the original seed batch were hybrids. Another cultivar of the plant, 'Bloodspot', was the product of breeding Agave maculata (then known as Manfreda maculosa) and Agave macroacantha in Japan.

Around the same time that 'Bloodspot' was being developed, these crosses were being made by others including Dr. John Lindstrom of the University of Arkansas and Tony Avent of Plant Delights Nursery/Juniper Level Botanic Garden in Raleigh, North Carolina. Two breakthroughs in the development of the hybrids came when Hans Hansen of Shady Oaks Nursery in Minnesota became the first person to successfully micropropagate mangaves. Both 'Bloodspot' and 'Macha Mocha' were tissue cultured in vitro, resulting in both becoming more widespread in cultivation. Tissue culture also resulted in two new cultivars derived from a mutation of 'Macho Mocha'. These were named 'Espresso' and 'Cappucino'.

Upon moving from Minnesota to Michigan to become a plant breeder for Walters Gardens, Hans Hansen dived deeper into mangave breeding, creating over 40 cultivars as of 2018.

== Description ==
Mangaves resemble compact, symmetrical agaves with succulent leaves. They typically grow to 8–24 in (20–60 cm) high and up to 18 in (50 cm) wide, although some can grow up to 4 ft (120 cm) high and 6 ft (180 cm) wide. The leaves of the plant are stiff, sometimes fragile, and variable in foliage color and patterns. Mangaves flower in June and July, producing brown flowers.

Mangaves inherit the drought-resisting traits of their parent plants. They can resist high temperatures and direct sunlight, but prefer shade. The plant can survive below freezing temperatures, but can become damaged if the temperature drops below -6 degrees Celsius. Although their drought resistance makes them particularly desirable plants in hot, dry places such as California, they can also be cultivated in parts of countries like the United Kingdom. They lack the dangerous spines of many species of Agave.

== Cultivars ==
About 30 cultivars were available as of November 2020. Examples include:

- Agave 'Bad Hair Day' – compact, rosette arches
- Agave 'Bloodspot' – grey-green leaves heavily marked with cranberry red spots and with maroon edges
- Agave 'Cappucino' - white-centered leaves; mutation of 'Macha Mocha'
- Agave 'Espresso' - white-edged leaves; mutation of 'Macha Mocha'
- Agave 'Lavender Lady' – purple-silver rosettes, more frost-sensitive
- Agave 'Macha Mocha' – gray-green leaves with brown-purple spots, coming together at the tips
- Agave 'Pineapple Express' – spotted leaves
- Agave 'Silver Fox' – pale grey, almost white leaves

Some cultivars have originated as sports of non-variegated varieties. A recent example of this phenomenon is Agave 'Ben's Dream', a variegated sport of Agave 'Snow Leopard' found in a California nursery.
