= Bad Hair =

Bad Hair may refer to:

- Bad Hair (2013 film), a Venezuelan drama film
- Bad Hair (2020 film), an American satirical comedy horror film
- Bad Hair (album), a 2016 album by Nasty C

== See also ==
- Bad Hair Day (disambiguation)
