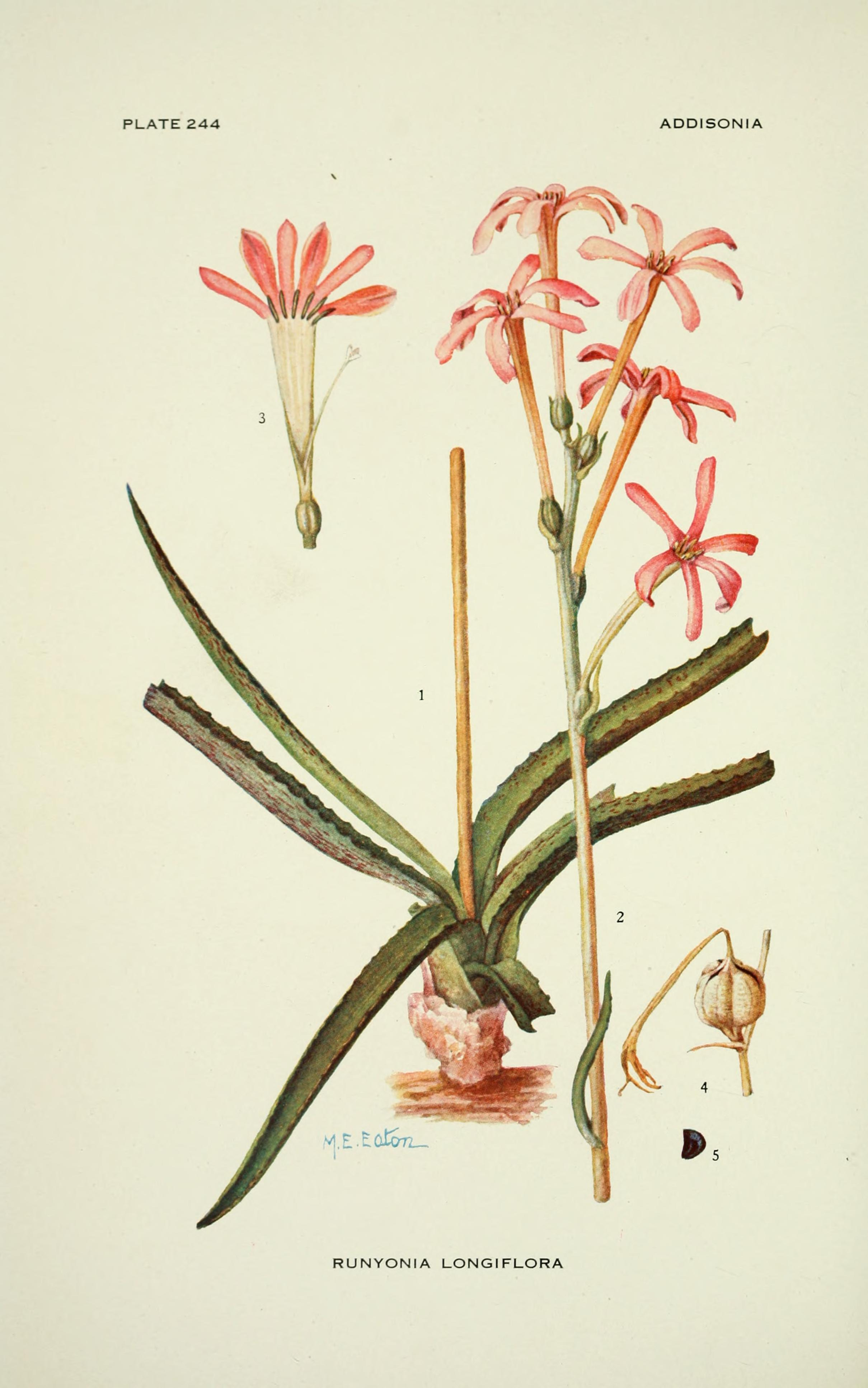

Conservation status
- Imperiled (NatureServe)

Scientific classification
- Kingdom: Plantae
- Clade: Embryophytes
- Clade: Tracheophytes
- Clade: Angiosperms
- Clade: Monocots
- Order: Asparagales
- Family: Asparagaceae
- Subfamily: Agavoideae
- Genus: Agave
- Species: A. longiflora

Binomial name
- Agave longiflora (Rose) G.D.Rowley

Synonyms
- Manfreda longiflora (Rose)Verh.-Will. Polianthes runyonii Shinners; Runyonia longiflora Rose

= Agave longiflora =

Species of plant

Agave longiflora (synonym Manfreda longiflora) is a species of flowering plant in the family Asparagaceae that is native to the Lower Rio Grande Valley of Texas in the United States and northern Tamaulipas in Mexico. Common names include amole de río, longflower tuberose, and Runyon's huaco. The type specimens were sent by botanist and photographer Robert Runyon (1881–1968) to the New York Botanical Garden in 1921. Consequently, the species was initially placed in a monotypic genus named in his honour, Runyonia, by Joseph Nelson Rose. The species has been placed in the genus Manfreda, now absorbed into Agave. A. longiflora is a rhizomatous perennial with 3–7 prostrate leaves in a basal rosette. It inhabits hills, terraces and slopes in the semi-arid Tamaulipan mezquital.
