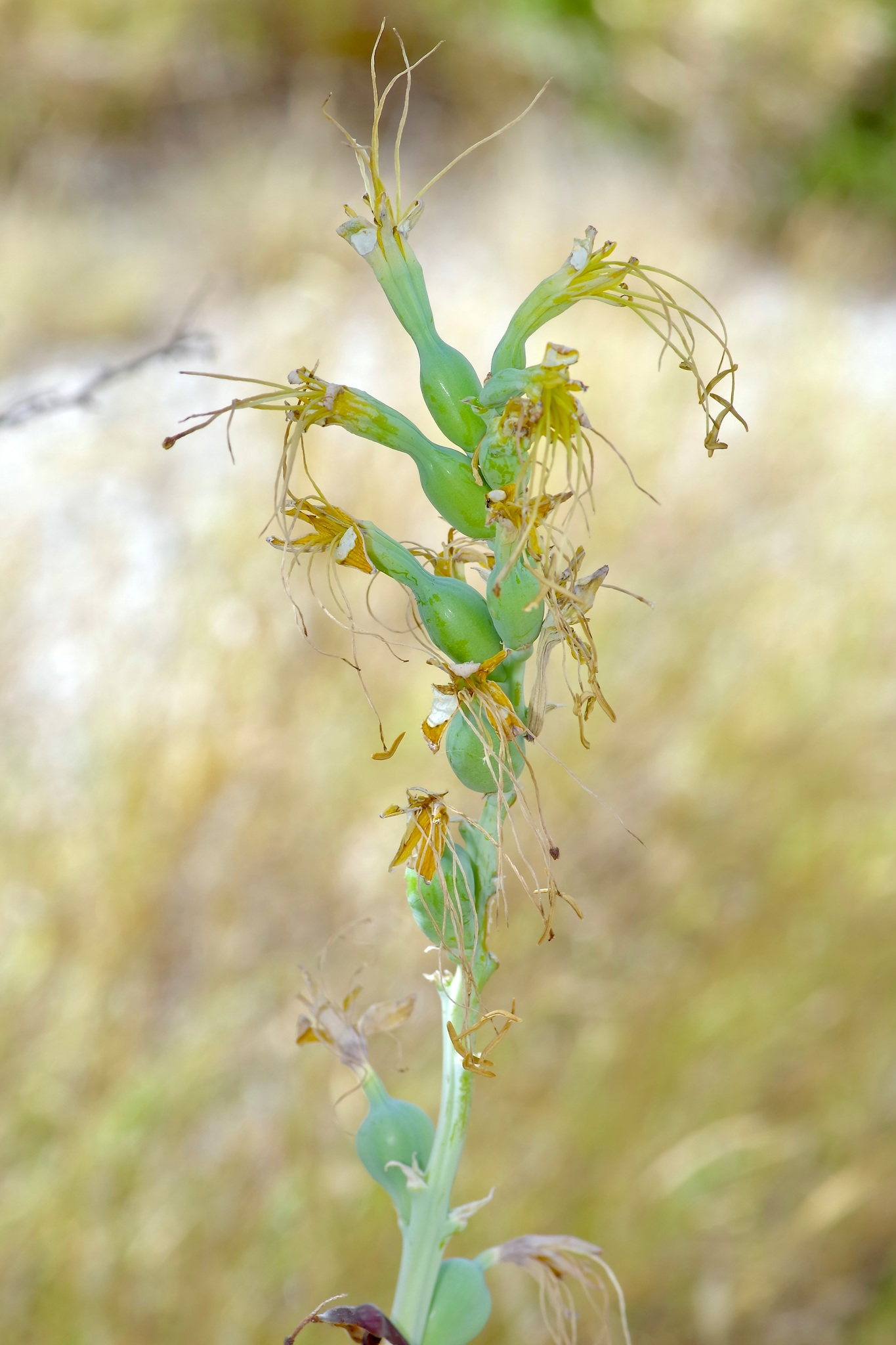

Scientific classification
- Kingdom: Plantae
- Clade: Tracheophytes
- Clade: Angiosperms
- Clade: Monocots
- Order: Asparagales
- Family: Asparagaceae
- Subfamily: Agavoideae
- Genus: Agave
- Species: A. sileri

Binomial name
- Agave sileri (Verh.-Will.) Thiede & Eggli

Synonyms
- Manfreda sileri Verh.-Will.

= Agave sileri =

Species of flowering plant

Agave sileri (synonym Manfreda sileri) is a species of Agave known only from coastal areas in the States of Texas and Tamaulipas. It grows on open locations with clay soil, at elevations below 100 m (330 feet). Siler's tuberose is a common name.

Agave sileri is a perennial herb spreading by means of globose underground rhizomes. It produces rosettes of waxy, light green leaves mottled with dark green or brown spots. The flowering stalk can reach a height of up to 220 cm (7.2 feet), with as many as 80 greenish-yellow flowers bearing large yellow anthers.
