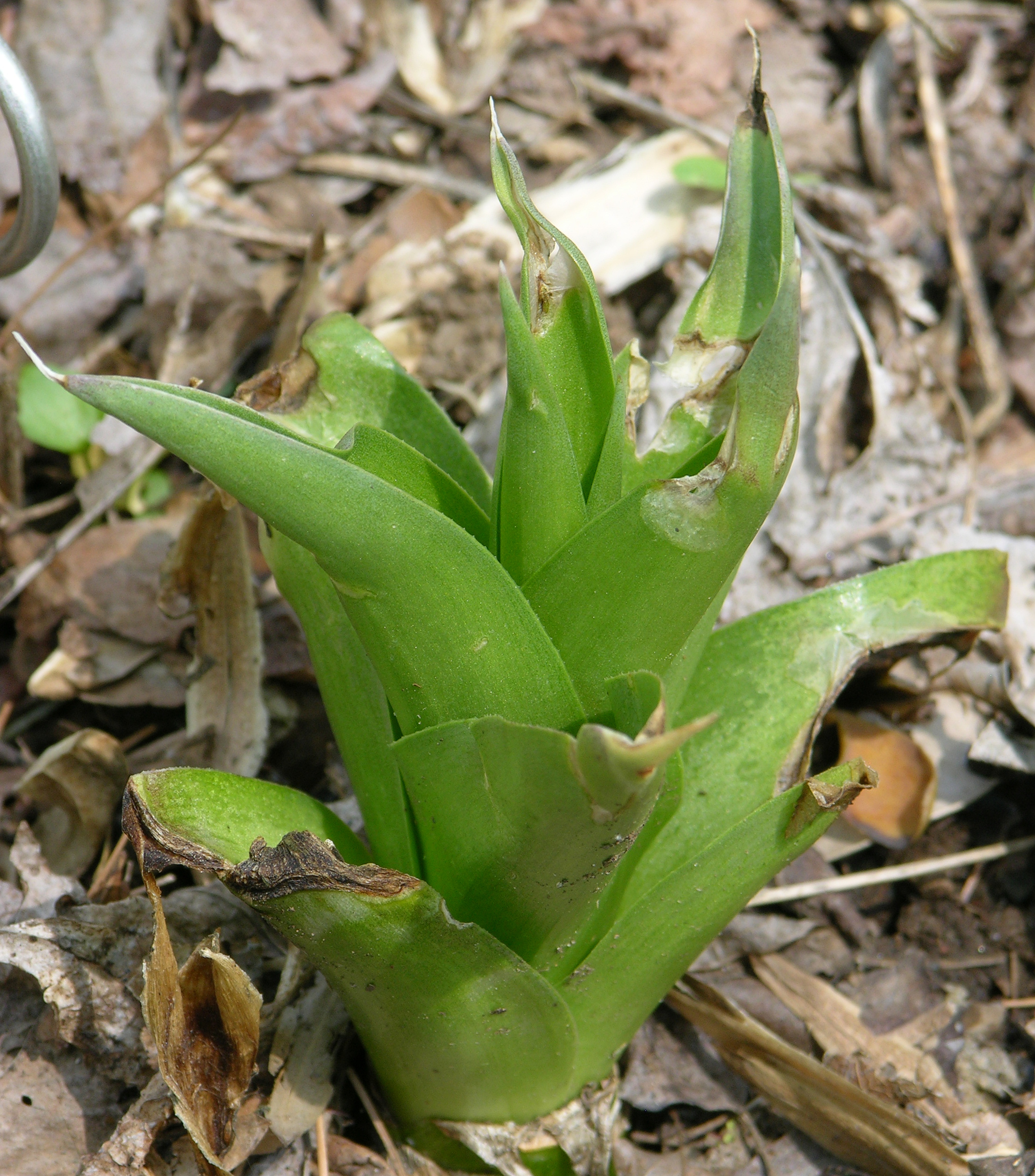

Conservation status
- Secure (NatureServe)

Scientific classification
- Kingdom: Plantae
- Clade: Tracheophytes
- Clade: Angiosperms
- Clade: Monocots
- Order: Asparagales
- Family: Asparagaceae
- Subfamily: Agavoideae
- Genus: Agave
- Species: A. virginica

Binomial name
- Agave virginica L.

Synonyms
- List: Agave alibertii Baker; Agave conduplicata Jacobi & C.D.Bouché; Agave lata Shinners; Agave pallida Salisb.; Agave tigrina (Engelm.) Cory; Agave virginica Baker; Allibertia intermedia Marion ex Baker; Aloe caroliniana Hill; Aloe virginica (L.) Crantz; Manfreda alibertii (Baker) Rose; Manfreda conduplicata (Jacobi & C.D.Bouché) Rose; Manfreda tigrina (Engelm.) Small; Manfreda virginica (L.) Salisb. ex Rose; Polianthes lata (Shinners) Shinners; Polianthes virginica (L.) Shinners

= Agave virginica =

Species of flowering plant

Agave virginica, synonym Manfreda virginica, commonly known as the false aloe, American aloe, Virginia agave, and eastern agave, is a species of agave. Older references occasionally used rattlesnake master to refer to Manfreda virginica, though current usage of rattlesnake master primarily refers to Eryngium yuccifolium. It is native to the central and southeastern United States and northeastern Mexico, where it is found in prairies, upland rocky glades, and sandy open woods.

== Description ==
False aloe is acaulescent, meaning the stem is extremely short. Leaves and flowering stems grow from a bulbous herbaceous caudex. The fleshy green leaves, usually spotted or speckled with maroon, are 10–46 cm (4–18 in) long and 1–6 cm (0.5–2.25 in) across. The leaf margins have fine teeth and leaves taper to a non-spiny tip. Leaf shape and size in Agave virginica vary with soil type, amount of shade, length of cold period, and position of leaf in the rosette. Speckles and spots occur frequently on some leaves in most populations, and some authors have used the informal designation "forma tigrina" for such variants.

In early summer, leafless flower stalks emerge from the basal rosettes of leaves, growing rapidly up to 2.1 m (7 ft) tall. The inflorescence appears June to August, with 10–61 closely spaced flowers grouped in a spike that is about 15–61 cm (6–24 in) long. Each flower, 2–3 cm (0.75–1.25 in) long, is whitish green or yellowish green, essentially tubular, nearly erect, and slender, with a fragrant sweet fruity odor. Seed capsules are spherical and 1–1.7 cm (0.4–0.7 in) in diameter.

== Distribution and habitat ==
It is native to an area stretching from North Carolina west to Texas and north to Illinois in the United States and south to Nuevo León and Tamaulipas in Mexico. Its habitat is sunny, well-drained areas in prairies, upland rocky glades, and sandy open woods. It is the only Agave species north of Texas.

== Ecology ==
Agave virginica is adapted primarily to nocturnal pollination by medium-sized moths and larger sphinx moths. Diurnal pollination by large bees results in significantly less seed set than nocturnal and open pollination. Ruby-throated hummingbirds are also attracted to the blooms.

== Gallery ==
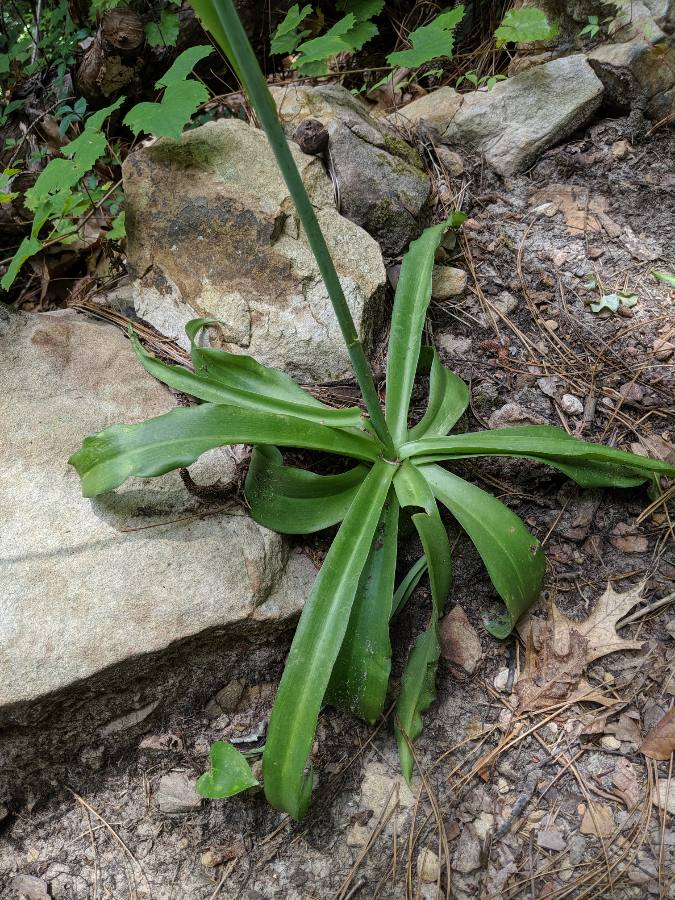
Leaves

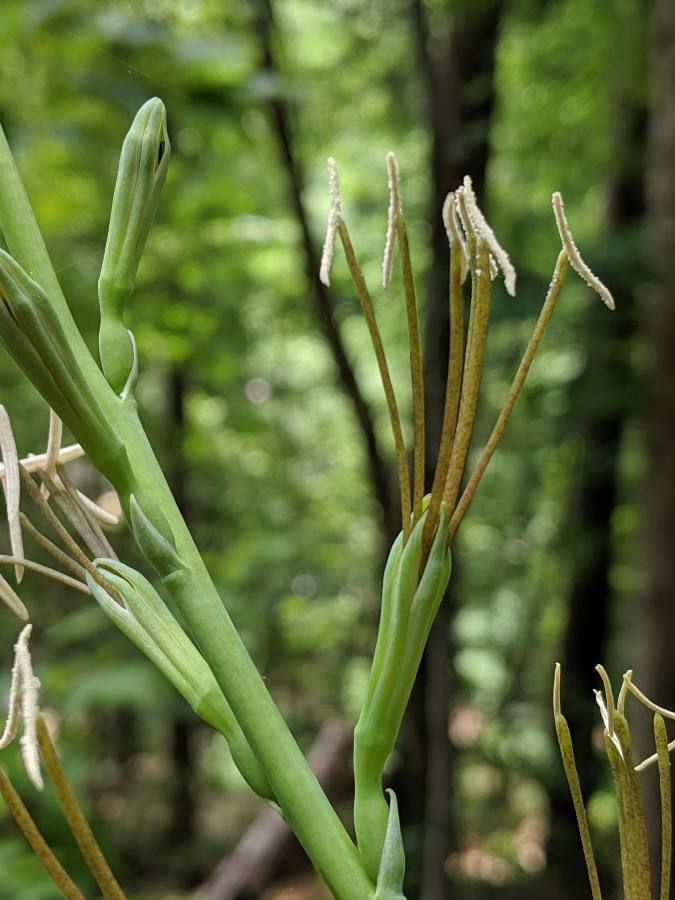
Flowers

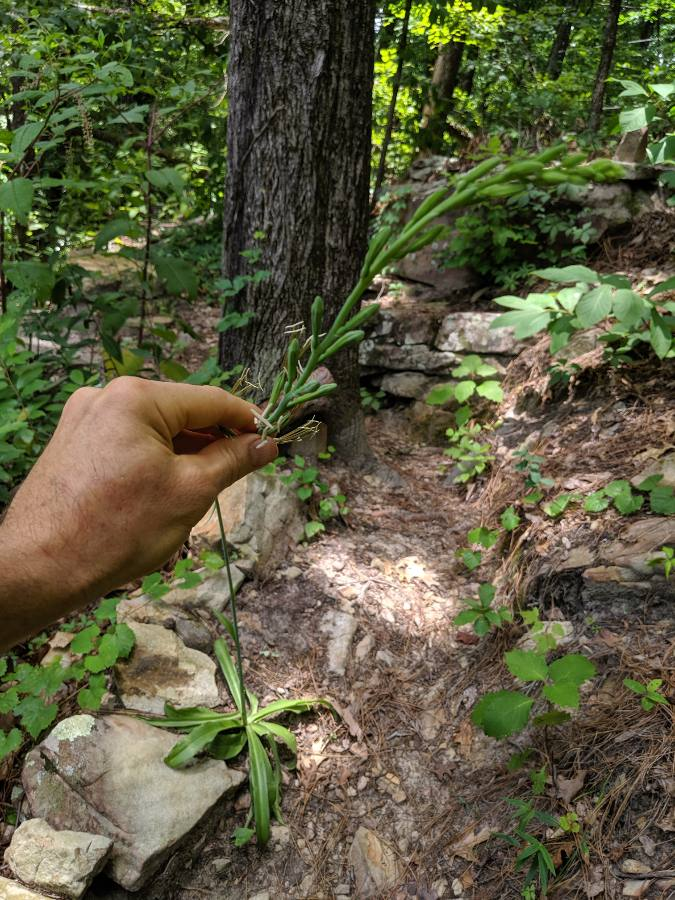
Stem with flowers
