= Prochnyanthes =

Scientific classification
- Kingdom: Plantae
- Clade: Tracheophytes
- Clade: Angiosperms
- Clade: Monocots
- Order: Asparagales
- Family: Asparagaceae
- Subfamily: Agavoideae
- Genus: Prochnyanthes; S.Watson
- Species: P. mexicana

Binomial name
- Prochnyanthes mexicana (Zucc.) Rose

Synonyms
- Agave bulliana (Baker) Thiede & Eggli; Bravoa bulliana Baker; Prochnyanthes bulliana (Baker) Baker; Polianthes mexicana Zucc. (1837) (basionym); Prochnyanthes viridescens S.Watson

Genus of flowering plants

Prochnyanthes is a genus of flowering plants in the family Asparagaceae. It includes a single species, Prochnyanthes mexicana, a tuberous geophyte native to northeastern and southwestern Mexico.

== Taxonomy ==
Prochnyanthes and close relatives have long presented significant taxonomic difficulty. With the advent of DNA sequencing, new karyologic and evolutionary phylogenetic studies showed that Prochnyanthes, along with Manfreda and Polianthes, were genetically nested within the traditional circumscription of Agave, rendering that genus paraphyletic. Early in the 21st century, these new phylogenetic results led to a reclassification of to include Prochnyanthes, Manfreda and Polianthes together as Agave subgenus Manfreda.

There was reaction against the changes from those who noted that the large morphological differences between the genera in this new Agave s.l. making them "counter-intuitive from a horticultural point of view". Thus, based on a wider consideration of previously established genetic, morphological, and estimated genetic divergence times, Vázquez-García et al. proposed a narrower circumscription of Agave, paving the way for a reconsideration of Prochnyanthes as a genus.
