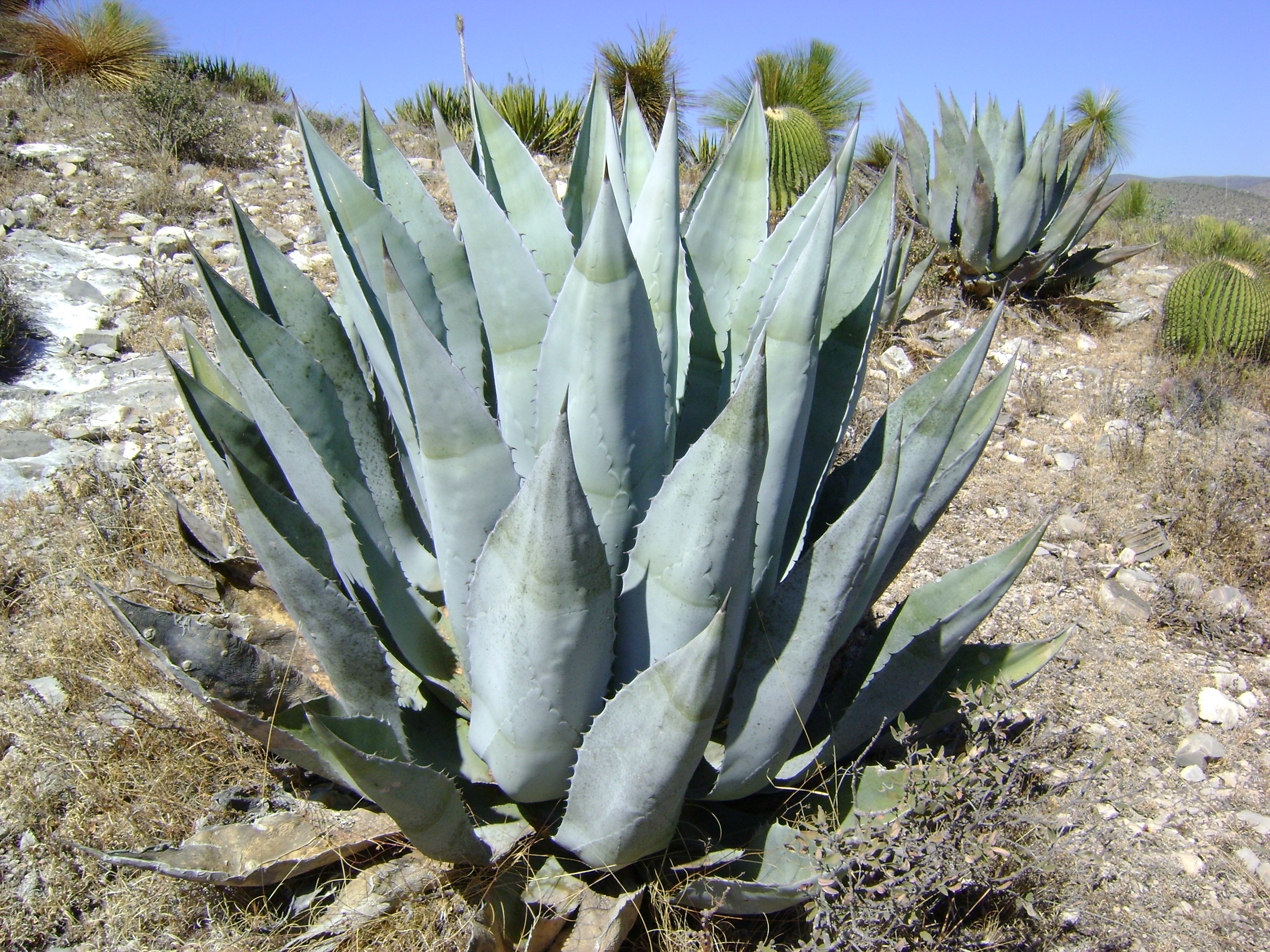

Scientific classification
- Kingdom: Plantae
- Clade: Tracheophytes
- Clade: Angiosperms
- Clade: Monocots
- Order: Asparagales
- Family: Asparagaceae
- Subfamily: Agavoideae
- Genus: Agave
- Species: A. scabra

Binomial name
- Agave scabra Ortega

Synonyms
- Agave brachystachys Cav.; Agave humilis M.Roem.; Agave langlassei André; Agave oliveriana (Rose) A.Berger; Agave polianthoides M.Roem.; Agave polyanthoides Schltdl. & Cham.; Agave saponaria Lindl.; Agave sessiliflora Hemsl.; Agave spicata DC., nom. illeg.; Manfreda brachystachys (Cav.) Rose; Manfreda malinaltenangensis Matuda; Manfreda oliveriana Rose; Manfreda scabra (Ortega) McVaugh; Manfreda sessiliflora (Hemsl.) Matuda; Polianthes brachystachys (Cav.) Shinners; Polianthes oliveriana (Rose) Shinners

= Agave scabra =

Species of flowering plant

Agave scabra (synonym Manfreda scabra), also known as rough leaved agave, is a member of the subfamily Agavoideae.

== Description ==
Agave scabra has rosettes growing 0.7–1 metre (2.3–3.3 ft) in height and 1.5–2 metres (4.9–6.6 ft) in width. It is similar in form to many other agaves. The rosettes are suckering.

The glaucous bluish-green leaves are mostly reflexed and rough (like sand-paper). The inflorescence is up to 4.5 metres (15 ft) in height, with yellow flowers during the summer.

== Distribution ==
It is native to the Chihuahuan Desert and surrounding regions, in northeastern Mexico and Texas. It grows at elevations of 500–1,500 metres (1,600–4,900 ft).
