= Urs Eggli =

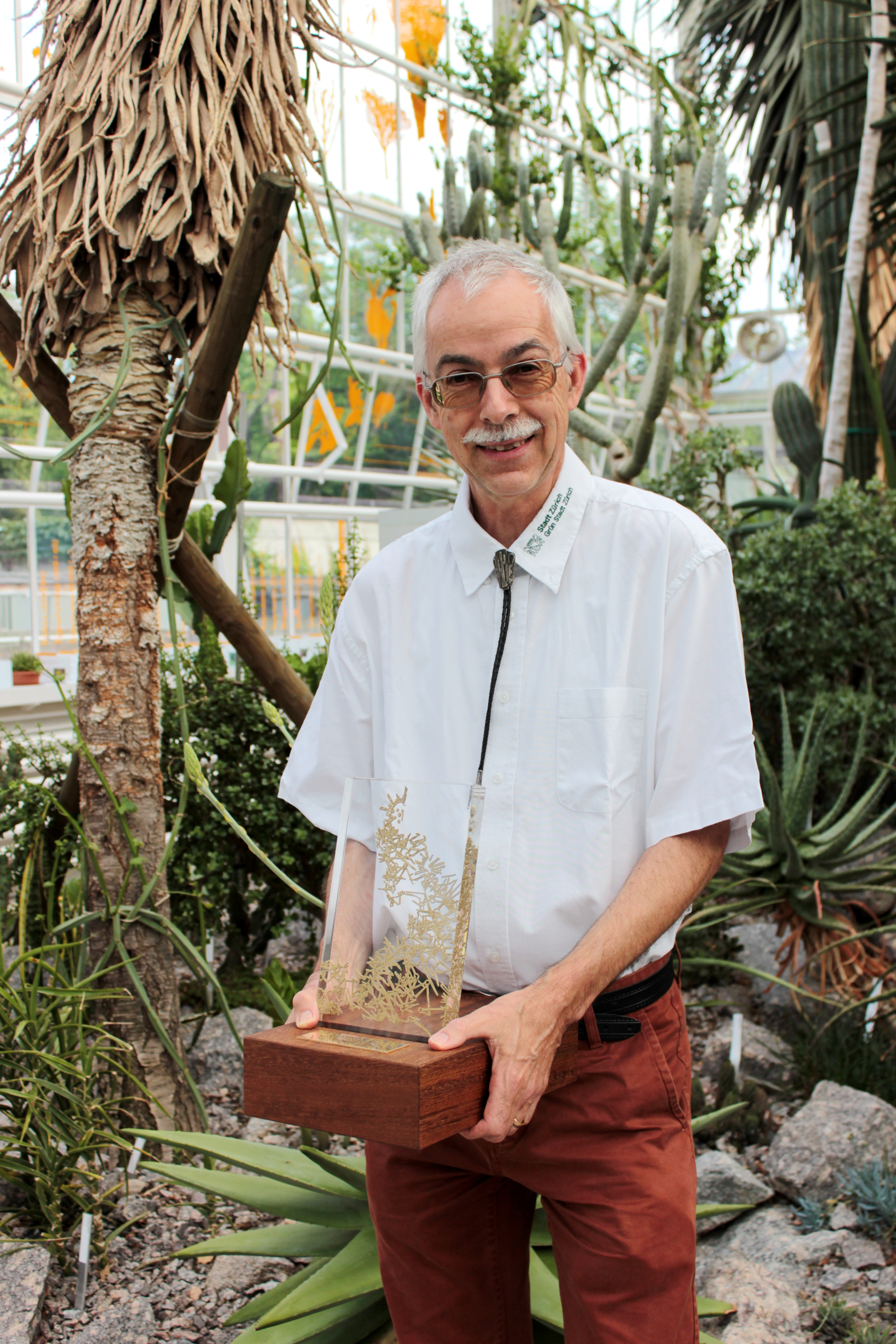
- Eggli in 2015
- Born: February 11, 1959 near Zürich, Switzerland
- Education: University of Zurich
- Known for: Systematics and nomenclature of succulent plants and Cactaceae
- Scientific career
- Fields: Botany, Plant systematics
- Workplaces: Succulent Collection Zurich

Urs Eggli (born 11 February 1959) is a Swiss botanist and non-fiction author specializing in succulent plants, particularly cacti. Since 1986, he has worked as a scientific staff member at the Succulent Collection Zurich, a specialized department of Grün Stadt Zürich.

== Biography ==
Eggli completed his secondary education in 1978 and subsequently studied biology with a focus on systematic botany at the University of Zurich. He completed his master's degree in 1983 with a thesis entitled The stomata of the Cactaceae.

Between 1983 and 1987, Eggli pursued doctoral studies at the University of Zurich under the supervision of Karl Urs Kramer, earning a PhD. His dissertation, A monographic study of the genus Rosularia (Crassulaceae), was published in 1988 as a supplement to volume 6 of Bradleya, the yearbook of the British Cactus and Succulent Society.

Since 1986, Eggli has been employed as a scientific collaborator at the Succulent Collection Zurich. He served as editor of the multi-volume reference series Illustrated Handbook of Succulent Plants, published between 2001 and 2003.

Since 1984, Eggli has also served as editor of the annual Repertorium Plantarum Succulentarum, published by the International Organization for Succulent Plant Study (IOS). His research interests focus on the systematics, nomenclature, evolution, and biodiversity of succulent plants.

Eggli has conducted extensive field research in Argentina, Brazil, Chile, and Uruguay, contributing empirical data on succulent diversity and evolution in South America.

== Honors and awards ==
In 2007, Eggli was named a Fellow of the Cactus and Succulent Society of America in recognition of his scientific and editorial contributions to succulent plant research.

In 2014, the International Organization for Succulent Plant Study nominated Eggli for the Cactus d’Or, awarded by the Principality of Monaco. He received the award in June 2015 at the Jardin Exotique de Monaco.

== Selected works ==
=== Books ===
- A Type Specimen Register of Cactaceae in Swiss Herbaria (1987)
- A monographic study of the genus Rosularia (Crassulaceae) (1988)
- Glossary of Botanical Terms with Special Reference to Succulent Plants (1993)
- Sukkulenten (1994; 2nd ed. 2008)
- Cactaceae of South America. The Ritter Collections (1995), with Mélica Muñoz-Schick and Beat Ernst Leuenberger
- The CITES Checklist of Succulent Euphorbia Taxa (1997), with Susan Carter
- Etymological Dictionary of Succulent Plant Names (2004), with Leonard Eric Newton

=== Selected articles ===
- “Living under temporarily arid conditions – succulence as an adaptive strategy” (2009)
- “Disintegrating Portulacaceae” (2010)
- “An up-to-date familial and suprafamilial classification of succulent plants” (2010)
- “A farewell to dated ideas and concepts: molecular phylogenetics and a revised suprageneric classification of the family Cactaceae” (2010)
