= Rhus sp. nov. A =

Conservation status
- Vulnerable (IUCN 3.1)

Scientific classification
- Kingdom: Plantae
- Clade: Tracheophytes
- Clade: Angiosperms
- Clade: Eudicots
- Clade: Rosids
- Order: Sapindales
- Family: Anacardiaceae
- Subfamily: Anacardioideae
- Genus: Rhus
- Species: R. sp. nov. A

Binomial name
- Rhus sp. nov. A

Synonyms
- Searsia sp. nov. A

Species of flowering plant

Rhus sp. nov. A is a species of flowering plant in the cashew family, Anacardiaceae, that is endemic to the Socotra Archipelago in Yemen. It can be found on the rocky slopes of wadis in drought-deciduous woodlands and succulent shrublands.
