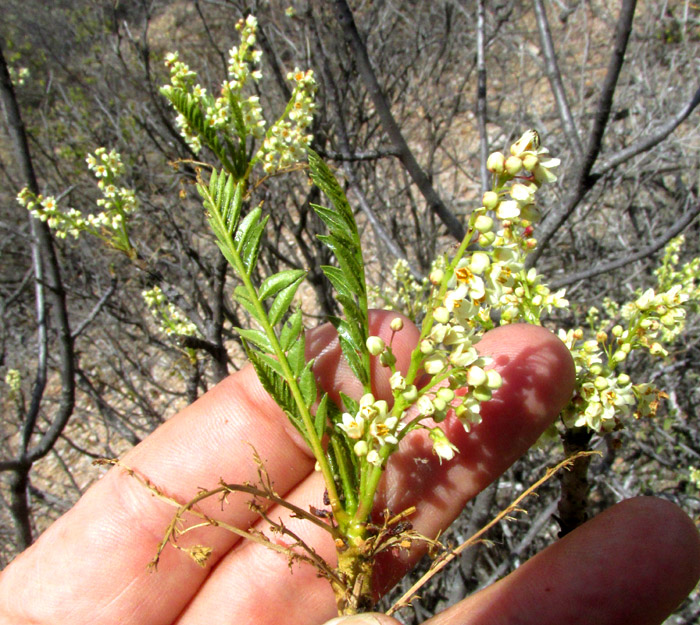
- Pseudosmodingium andrieuxii, emerging inflorescence and leaves

Scientific classification
- Kingdom: Plantae
- Clade: Tracheophytes
- Clade: Angiosperms
- Clade: Eudicots
- Clade: Rosids
- Order: Sapindales
- Family: Anacardiaceae
- Genus: Pseudosmodingium
- Species: P. andrieuxii

Binomial name
- Pseudosmodingium andrieuxii (Baill.) Engl., 1881

Synonyms
- Smodingium andrieuxii Baill (1874); Pseudosmodingium multifolium Rose (1897)

= Pseudosmodingium andrieuxii =

Species of plant

Pseudosmodingium andrieuxii is a flowering plant belonging to the family Anacardiaceae.

== Description ==
Pseudosmodingium andrieuxii, with no English name, is a bush or small tree up to 6m tall (~20 feet). It is hairless, or essentially so. Within the family Anacardiaceae and in common with other surviving species of Pseudosmodingium, P. andrieuxii is characterized by this combination of features:

- Leaves are divided into leaflets, with the rachis tipped with a leaflet (imparipinate)
- Flowers are arranged in panicles.
- Plants bear either all male or all female flowers, thus the plants are dioecious, or else they produce mostly flowers of only one sex along with a few flowers of the other sex, and possibly with some flowers developing both male and female parts, in which case the plants are said to be "polygamodioecious".
- Fruits are drupe-type and develop two papery wings.

Within the genus Pseudosmodingium, P. andrieuxii is distinguished by these features:

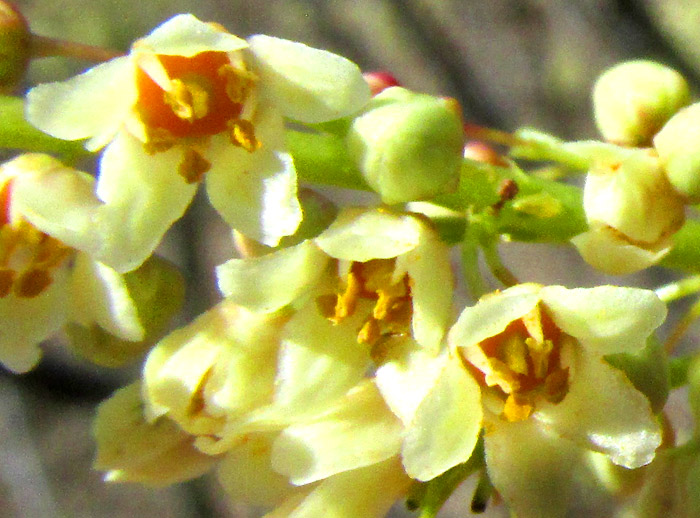
Pseudosmodingium andrieuxii male flowers with stamens arising from beneath a pink, flattened ring-shaped nectary disc

- Leaves are divided into 13 or more leaflets.
- Panicles are only up to about 10cm long (~4 inches)
- Flowers are yellow at the bases of their corollas.
- Drupes are pale.

Other noteworthy general features include that each flower, with petals up 3 mm (0.12 in) long, stands atop a slender petiole up to 7 mm (0.28 in) long. The drupes are a little flattened but almost orbicular, usually straw-colored, hairless, shiny, and up to 8 mm (0.31 in) long and about 10 mm (0.39 in) wide. The leaves, which arise singly from their stems and are up to 20 cm (7.9 in) long, may bear glands or appear as if they are varnished (viscid).

== Distribution ==
On the iNaturalist page for Pseudosmodingium andrieuxii, the map showing locations of observations of the species by citizen scientists documents that it is endemic just to Mexico's central and southern regions.

== Habitat ==
In central Mexico, Pseudosmodingium andrieuxii grows on soils derived from limestones and shales. The vegetation of the area can be described as Central Mexican matorral.

== As an allergenic ==
Note: Handle Pseudosmodingium andrieuxii with caution because contact can cause an acute allergic reaction; it is among the most toxic species in its genus.

Among the Zapotec peoples of southern Mexico, Pseudosmodingium andrieuxii is called hinchahuevos, which loosely means "testicle-sweller", because of its "... notorious propensity for producing soreness, inflammation, and swelling of the testicles." Presumably the swelling occurs after handling the bush, then scratching oneself.

In a study of toxic phenols occurring in various species of the family Anacardiaceae it was found that Pseudosmodingium andrieuxii contains urushiol, which is known to produce allergenic effects, especially dermatitis, in such species as Poison Ivy, Poison Sumac and Poisonwood.

== Taxonomy ==
Before 2004, Pseudosmodingium andrieuxii and P. multifolium were considered separate taxa, but now the later has been merged into P. andrieuxii.

== Etymology ==
The genus name Pseudosmodingium, beginning with the Late Latin prefix pseudo-, meaning "false", indicates that the taxon is a "false Smodingium," which is an African shrub or small tree bearing leaves a little like our taxon, and produces sap which is toxic to the skin; sometimes it is called African Poison Ivy. The name Smodingium is said to derive from the Greek, meaning "an indurated mark", referring to the hard fruit.

In the original 1874 description of Pseudosmodingium andrieuxii, treated there as Smodingium andrieuxii, it appears that the species name andrieuxii was chosen to honor a plant collector, a certain Andrieux, who during a visit to Mexico in 1834 collected the plant that became the type specimen. The author, Henri Ernest Baillon, wrote in Latin: "Species in herbarüs valde manca, in ditione mexicana, ano 1834, ab Andrieus (exs., n.184) lecta fuit (Herb. Mus. par.)." It is known that a G. Andrieux, who sent his collected specimens to de Candolle, Delessert and others, was active in southern Mexico in 1834.

== Gallery ==
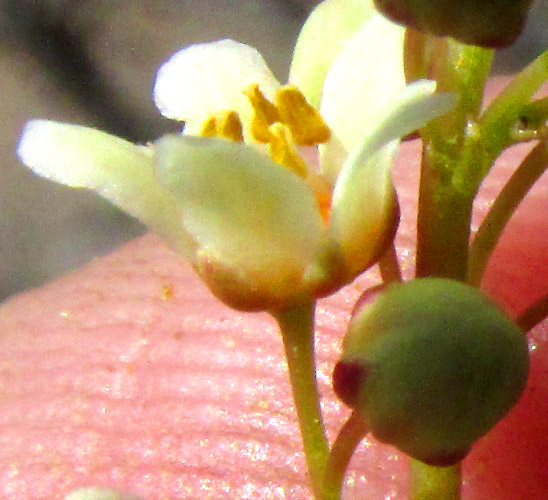
Pseudosmodingium andrieuxii flower from side

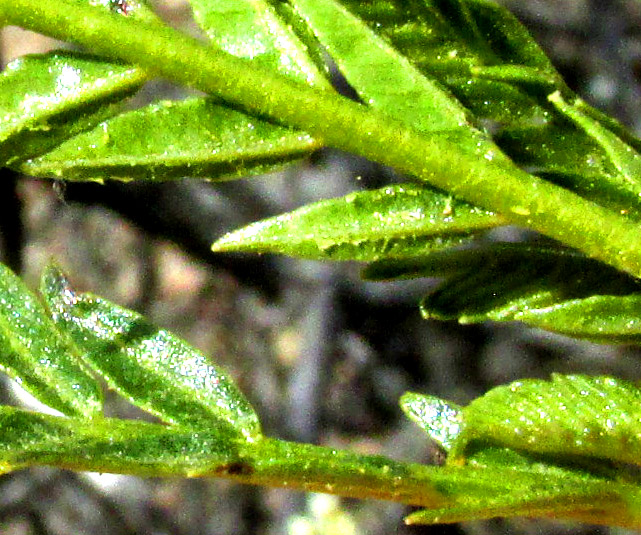
Pseudosmodingium andrieuxii close-up of resiny leaflets

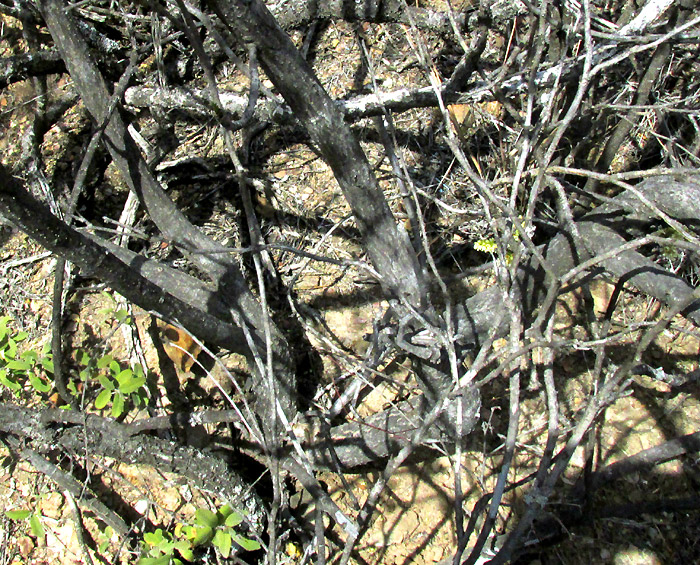
Pseudosmodingium andrieuxii much branched woody base

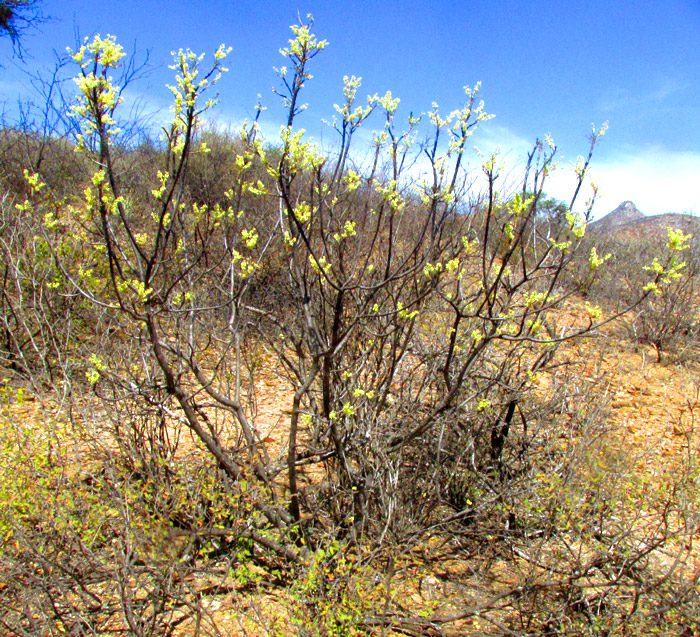
Pseudosmodingium andrieuxii plant issuing flowers and leaves
