= Trichoscypha oddonii =

Conservation status
- Least Concern (IUCN 3.1)

Scientific classification
- Kingdom: Plantae
- Clade: Tracheophytes
- Clade: Angiosperms
- Clade: Eudicots
- Clade: Rosids
- Order: Sapindales
- Family: Anacardiaceae
- Genus: Trichoscypha
- Species: T. oddonii

Binomial name
- Trichoscypha oddonii De Wild.

Synonyms
- Trichoscypha abut Engl. & Brehmer; Trichoscypha brieyi De Wild. Trichoscypha cabindensis Exell & Mendonça; Trichoscypha ejui Engl. & Brehmer; Trichoscypha letestui Lecomte

Species of flowering plant

Trichoscypha oddonii, common name mbuta, is a species of plant in the family Anacardiaceae. It is found from Cameroon to the Congos and northern Angola. Mature trees reach 26m in height and leaves are up to 2.5m long. It is very similar to Trichoscypha acuminata in all characteristics, with the fruit being a little more acidic.
