= Pseudosmodingium virletii =

Conservation status
- Vulnerable (IUCN 3.1)

Scientific classification
- Kingdom: Plantae
- Clade: Tracheophytes
- Clade: Angiosperms
- Clade: Eudicots
- Clade: Rosids
- Order: Sapindales
- Family: Anacardiaceae
- Genus: Pseudosmodingium
- Species: P. virletii

Binomial name
- Pseudosmodingium virletii Engl.

Synonyms
- Smodingium virletii Baill.

Species of plant

Pseudosmodingium virletii is a species of flowering plant in the family Anacardiaceae, native to northeastern and central Mexico. A shrub, it can be found in dry scrublands and forests.
