= Thyrsodium herrerense =

Conservation status
- Vulnerable (IUCN 2.3)

Scientific classification
- Kingdom: Plantae
- Clade: Tracheophytes
- Clade: Angiosperms
- Clade: Eudicots
- Clade: Rosids
- Order: Sapindales
- Family: Anacardiaceae
- Genus: Thyrsodium
- Species: T. herrerense

Binomial name
- Thyrsodium herrerense Encarnacion

Species of tree

Thyrsodium herrerense is a species of tree in the family Anacardiaceae. It is endemic to Peru.
