= Nothopegia heyneana =

Conservation status
- Near Threatened (IUCN 2.3)

Scientific classification
- Kingdom: Plantae
- Clade: Tracheophytes
- Clade: Angiosperms
- Clade: Eudicots
- Clade: Rosids
- Order: Sapindales
- Family: Anacardiaceae
- Genus: Nothopegia
- Species: N. heyneana

Binomial name
- Nothopegia heyneana Gamble

Species of flowering plant

Nothopegia heyneana is a species of plant in the family Anacardiaceae. It is endemic to India.
