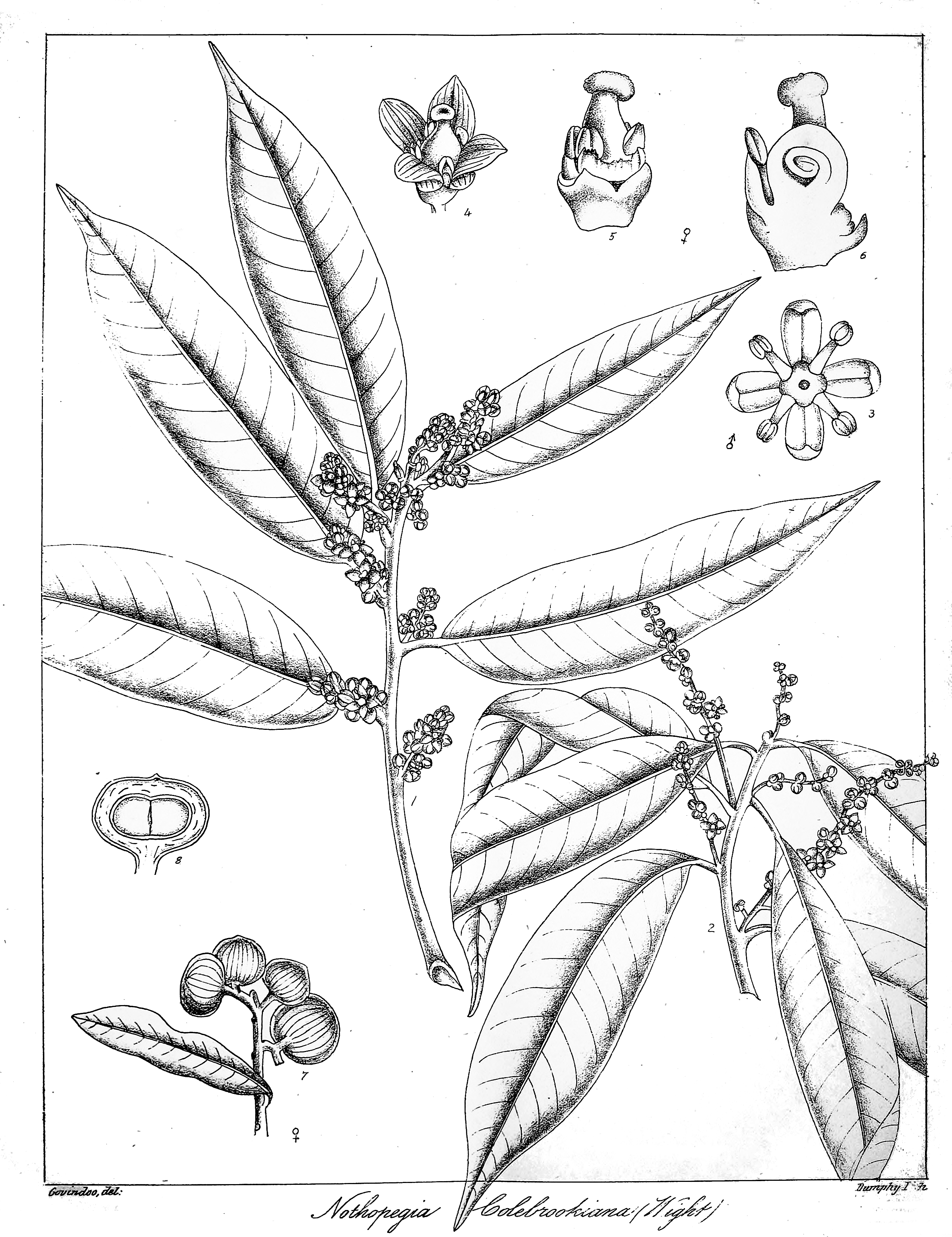

Scientific classification
- Kingdom: Plantae
- Clade: Tracheophytes
- Clade: Angiosperms
- Clade: Eudicots
- Clade: Rosids
- Order: Sapindales
- Family: Anacardiaceae
- Genus: Nothopegia
- Species: N. colebrookeana

Binomial name
- Nothopegia colebrookeana (Wight) Blume

= Nothopegia colebrookeana =

Species of flowering plant

Nothopegia colebrookeana is a species of plant in the family Anacardiaceae. It is found in the Indian states of Kerala and Tamil Nadu.

== Description ==
Evergreen trees with pubescent branchlets, white exudation, simple alternate leaves, small greenish white flowers, and drupaceous fruits.

== Local Names ==
ചോരപ്പാല അഥവാ മാഞ്ചേര് (Malayalam)
