= Androtium =

Scientific classification
- Kingdom: Plantae
- Clade: Tracheophytes
- Clade: Angiosperms
- Clade: Eudicots
- Clade: Rosids
- Order: Sapindales
- Family: Anacardiaceae
- Subfamily: Anacardioideae
- Genus: Androtium; Stapf
- Species: A. astylum

Binomial name
- Androtium astylum Stapf

Genus of trees

Androtium is a monotypic genus of trees in the cashew or sumac family Anacardiaceae. It contains the single species Androtium astylum. The generic name Androtium is from the Greek meaning "male ear-lobe", referring to the shape of the lobe of the stamen. The specific epithet astylum is from the Latin meaning "without style", referring to the plant's ovary.

== Description ==
Androtium astylum grows as a tree up to 20 metres (70 ft) tall with a trunk diameter of up to 40 cm (16 in). Its finely cracked bark is chocolate-brown with grey patches. The flowers are white. The fruits measure up to 1.5 cm (0.6 in) long.

== Distribution and habitat ==
Androtium astylum grows naturally in Peninsular Malaysia and Borneo. Its habitat is lowland forests including swamps.
