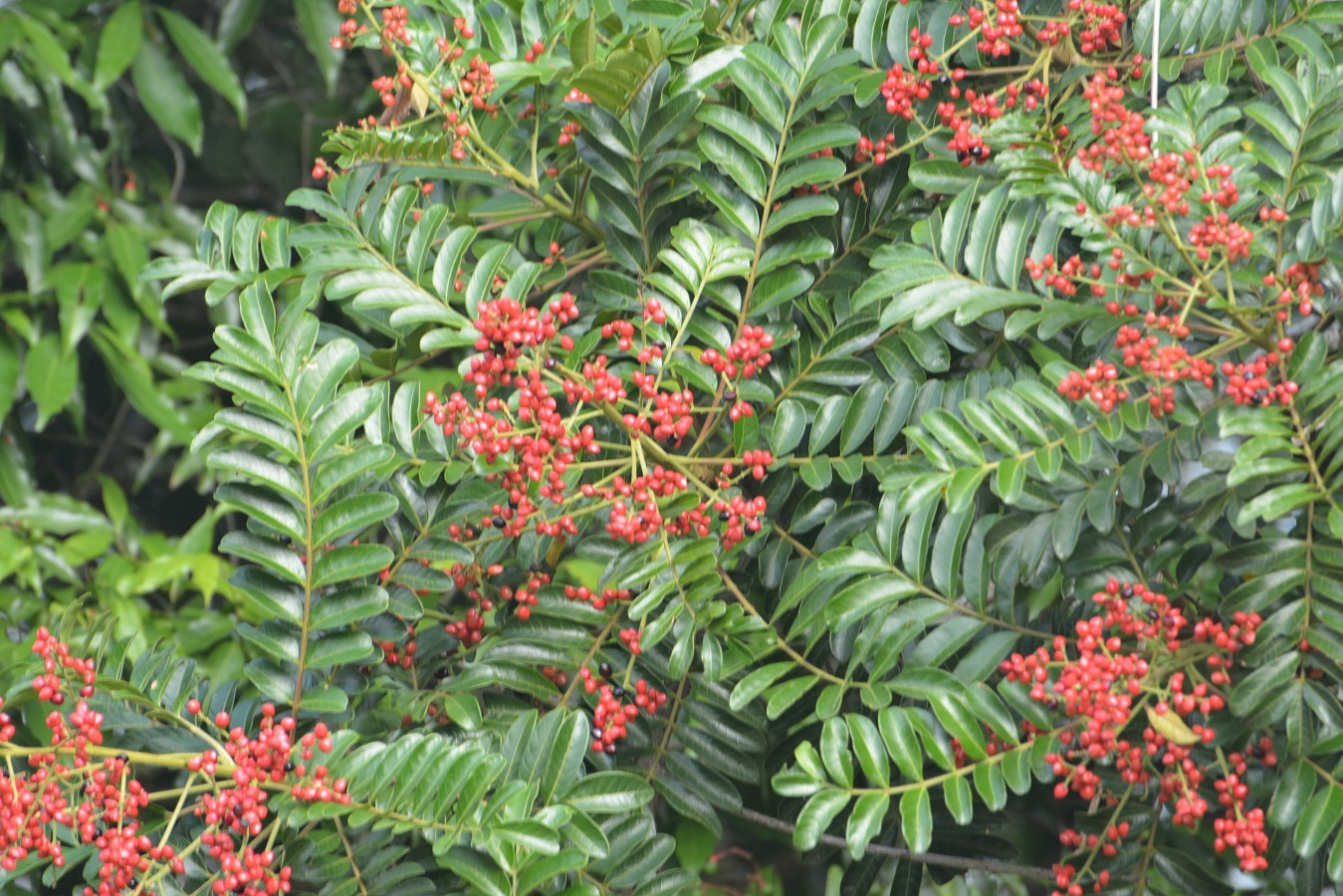
- Mosquitoxylum jamaicense in Chiapas, Mexico

Conservation status
- Least Concern (IUCN 3.1)

Scientific classification
- Kingdom: Plantae
- Clade: Tracheophytes
- Clade: Angiosperms
- Clade: Eudicots
- Clade: Rosids
- Order: Sapindales
- Family: Anacardiaceae
- Subfamily: Anacardioideae
- Genus: Mosquitoxylum; Krug & Urb.
- Species: M. jamaicense

Binomial name
- Mosquitoxylum jamaicense Krug & Urb.

Synonyms
- Mosquitoxylum jamaicense var. panamense F.A.Barkley & M.J.Reed

= Mosquitoxylum =

Genus of trees

Mosquitoxylum is a monotypic genus of trees in the subfamily Anacardioideae of the family Anacardiaceae. It contains the single species Mosquitoxylum jamaicense, native to an area from southern Mexico to Ecuador and also to Jamaica.
