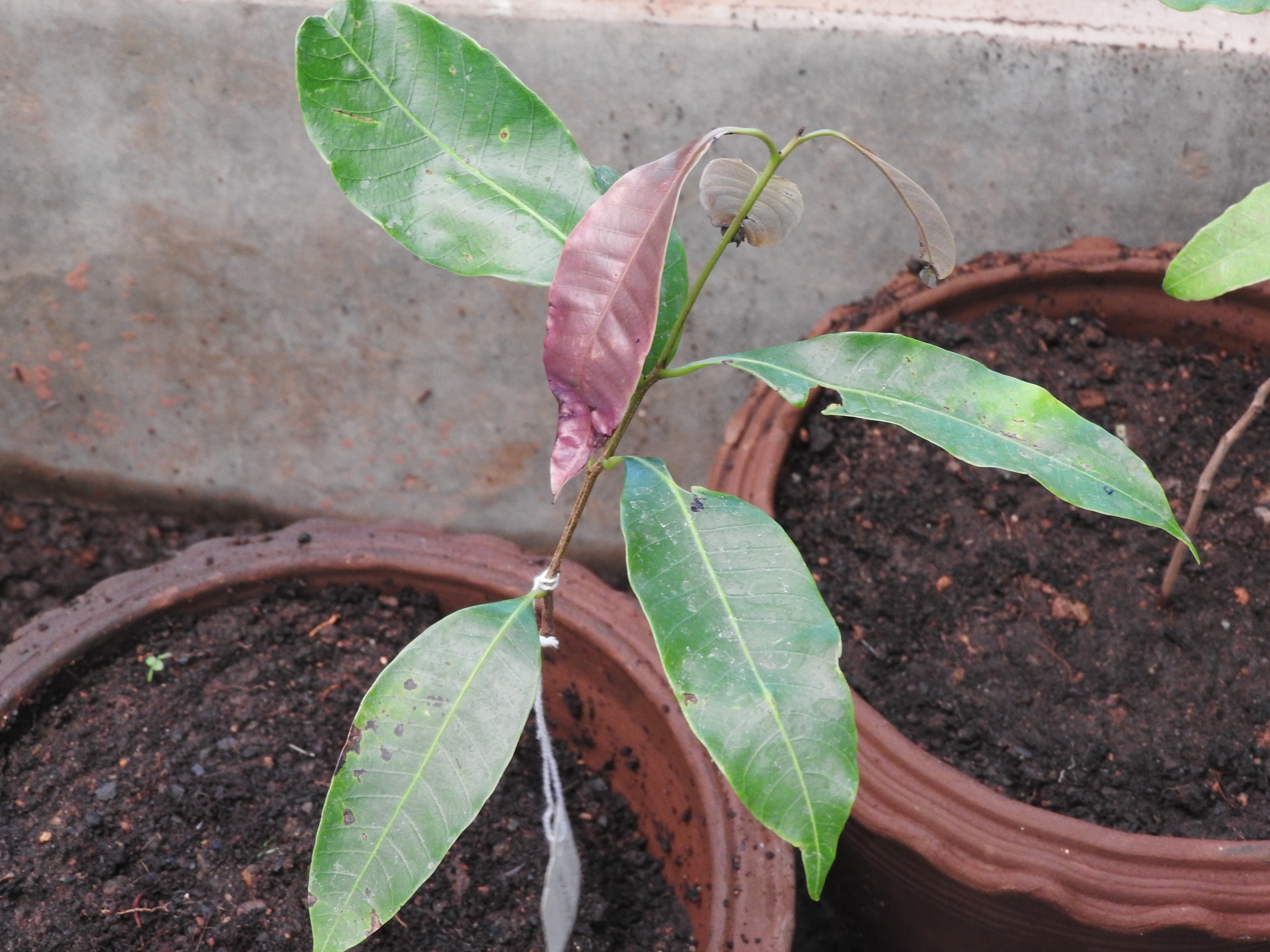

Conservation status
- Critically Endangered (IUCN 2.3)

Scientific classification
- Kingdom: Plantae
- Clade: Tracheophytes
- Clade: Angiosperms
- Clade: Eudicots
- Clade: Rosids
- Order: Sapindales
- Family: Anacardiaceae
- Genus: Nothopegia
- Species: N. castaneifolia

Binomial name
- Nothopegia castaneifolia (Roth) Ding Hou

Synonyms
- Ficus castaneifolia Roth (1817) (basionym); Glycicarpus edulis Dalzell; Glycicarpus racemosa Dalzell; Nothopegia dalzellii Gamble; Nothopegia dalzellii var. angustifolia Gamble; Nothopegia racemosa (Dalzell) Ramamoorthy; Nothopegia racemosa var. angustifolia (Gamble) Chithra

= Nothopegia castaneifolia =

Species of flowering plant

Nothopegia castaneifolia is a species of plant in the family Anacardiaceae. It is endemic to the border between the southwestern Maharashtra and northwestern Karnataka states in southern India.

== Description ==
This is an understory tree growing up to 15m. bark with dark latex. Small white flowers are polygamouse. Fruits are fleshy drupe.
