= Trichoscypha bijuga =

Conservation status
- Near Threatened (IUCN 3.1)

Scientific classification
- Kingdom: Plantae
- Clade: Tracheophytes
- Clade: Angiosperms
- Clade: Eudicots
- Clade: Rosids
- Order: Sapindales
- Family: Anacardiaceae
- Genus: Trichoscypha
- Species: T. bijuga

Binomial name
- Trichoscypha bijuga Engl.

Synonyms
- Trichoscypha beguei Aubrév. & Pellegr. Trichoscypha dinklagei Engl. Trichoscypha gossweileri Exell & Mendonça; Trichoscypha preussii Engl.

Species of flowering plant

Trichoscypha bijuga is a species of plant in the family Anacardiaceae. It is found in Cameroon, Ivory Coast, Equatorial Guinea, Ghana, Guinea, and Liberia. Its natural habitat is subtropical or tropical moist lowland forests. It is threatened by habitat loss.
