= Orthopterygium =

Conservation status
- Vulnerable (IUCN 3.1)

Scientific classification
- Kingdom: Plantae
- Clade: Tracheophytes
- Clade: Angiosperms
- Clade: Eudicots
- Clade: Rosids
- Order: Sapindales
- Family: Anacardiaceae
- Subfamily: Anacardioideae
- Genus: Orthopterygium; Hemsl.
- Species: O. huaucui

Binomial name
- Orthopterygium huaucui (A.Gray) Hemsl.

Synonyms
- Amphipterygium huaucui (A.Gray) Hemsl. & Rose; Juliania huaucui A.Gray

Species of plant

Orthopterygium is a monotypic genus of dioecious plants in the subfamily Anacardioideae of the cashew and sumac family Anacardiaceae. It contains the single species Orthopterygium huaucui, which is endemic to western Peru.
