= Trichoscypha cavalliensis =

Conservation status
- Vulnerable (IUCN 2.3)

Scientific classification
- Kingdom: Plantae
- Clade: Tracheophytes
- Clade: Angiosperms
- Clade: Eudicots
- Clade: Rosids
- Order: Sapindales
- Family: Anacardiaceae
- Genus: Trichoscypha
- Species: T. cavalliensis

Binomial name
- Trichoscypha cavalliensis Aubrév. & Pellegr.

Species of flowering plant

Trichoscypha cavalliensis is a species of plant in the family Anacardiaceae. It is found in Ivory Coast, Ghana, and Liberia. It is threatened by habitat loss.
