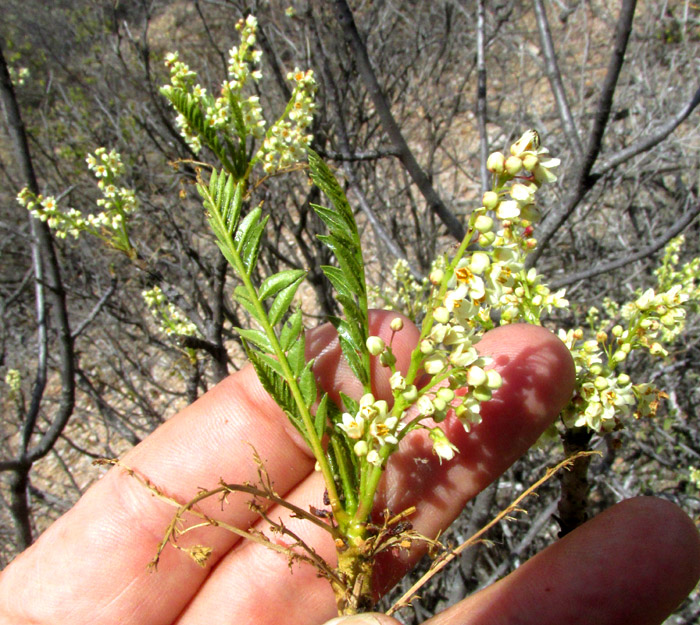
- Pseudosmodingium andrieuxii, emerging inflorescence and leaves

Scientific classification
- Kingdom: Plantae
- Clade: Tracheophytes
- Clade: Angiosperms
- Clade: Eudicots
- Clade: Rosids
- Order: Sapindales
- Family: Anacardiaceae
- Subfamily: Anacardioideae
- Genus: Pseudosmodingium; Engl. (1881)

Species
- See text

Synonyms
- Trujanoa La Llave (1825)

= Pseudosmodingium =

Genus of flowering plants

Pseudosmodingium is a genus of plants in the subfamily Anacardioideae of the cashew and sumac family (Anacardiaceae) endemic to Mexico.

== Species ==
Five species are accepted.

- Pseudosmodingium andrieuxii (Baill.) Engl.
- Pseudosmodingium barkleyi Miranda
- Pseudosmodingium perniciosum (Kunth) Engl.
- Pseudosmodingium rhoifolium (DC.) F.A.Barkley
- Pseudosmodingium virletii (Baill.) Engl.
