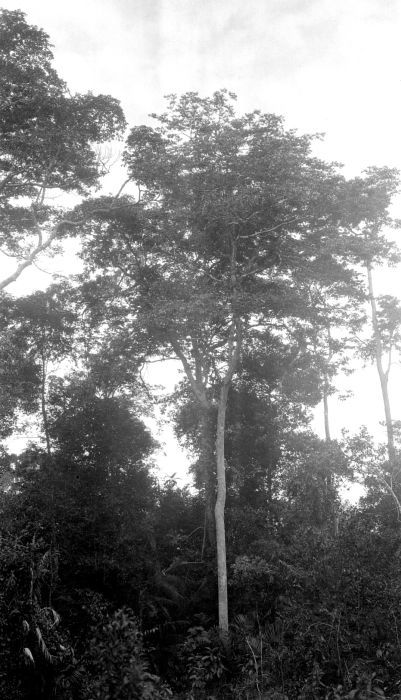
- Pentaspadon motleyi

Scientific classification
- Kingdom: Plantae
- Clade: Tracheophytes
- Clade: Angiosperms
- Clade: Eudicots
- Clade: Rosids
- Order: Sapindales
- Family: Anacardiaceae
- Subfamily: Anacardioideae
- Genus: Pentaspadon; Hook.f.

Synonyms
- Microstemon Engl.; Nothoprotium Miq.

= Pentaspadon =

Genus of flowering plants

Pentaspadon is a genus of plants in the family Anacardiaceae.

== Taxonomy ==
=== Species ===
As of July 2020, Plants of the World online has 6 accepted species:

- Pentaspadon annamense (Evrard & Tardieu) P.H.Hô
- Pentaspadon curtisii (King) Corner
- Pentaspadon minutiflora B.L.Burtt
- Pentaspadon motleyi Hook.f.
- Pentaspadon poilanei (Evrard & Tardieu) P.H.Hô
- Pentaspadon velutinus Hook.f.
