= Trichoscypha mannii =

Conservation status
- Vulnerable (IUCN 2.3)

Scientific classification
- Kingdom: Plantae
- Clade: Tracheophytes
- Clade: Angiosperms
- Clade: Eudicots
- Clade: Rosids
- Order: Sapindales
- Family: Anacardiaceae
- Genus: Trichoscypha
- Species: T. mannii

Binomial name
- Trichoscypha mannii Hook.f.

Species of flowering plant

Trichoscypha mannii is a species of plant in the family Anacardiaceae. It is found in Cameroon, Ivory Coast, Ghana, Liberia, and Nigeria. It is threatened by habitat loss.
