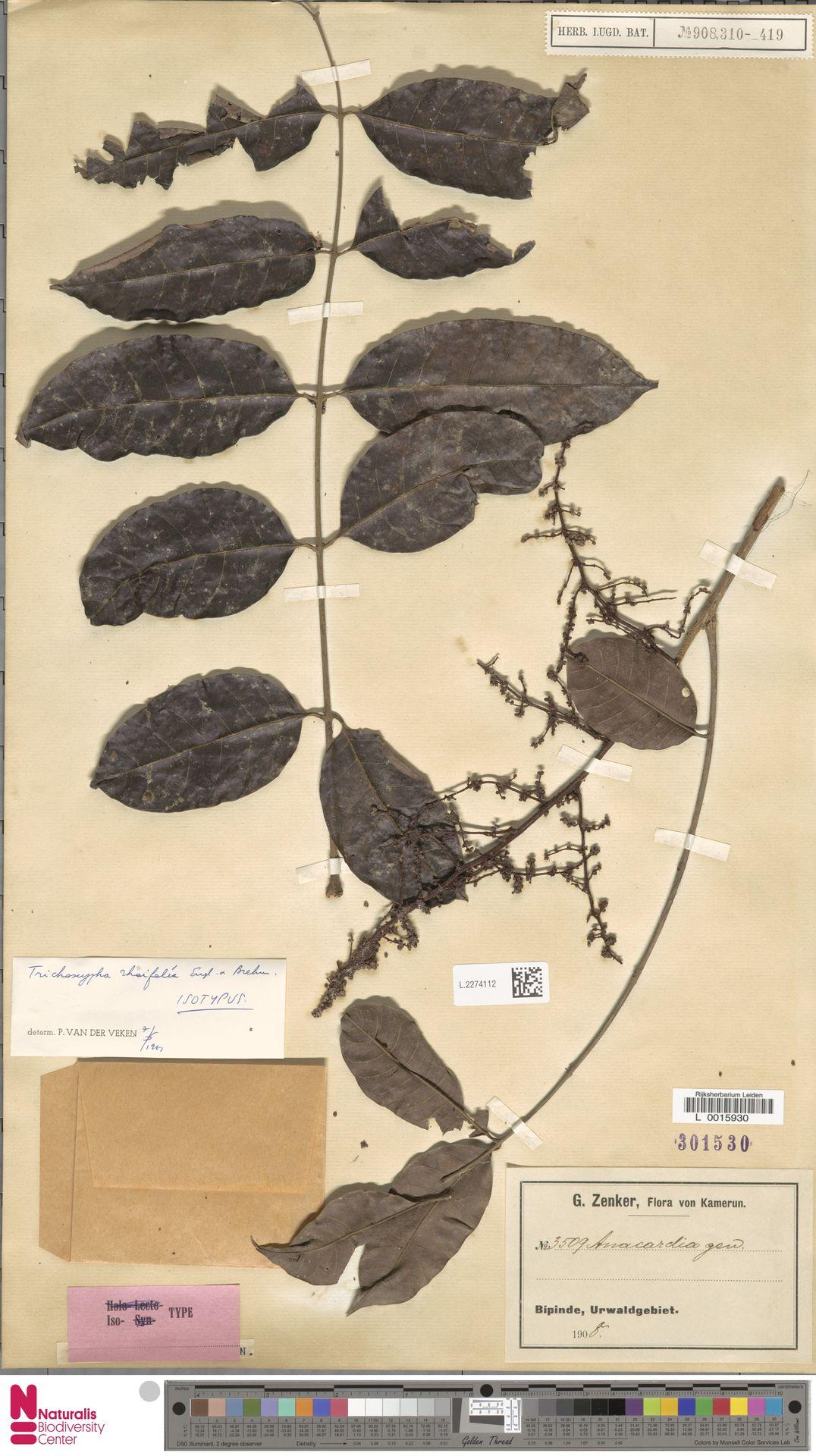

Scientific classification
- Kingdom: Plantae
- Clade: Tracheophytes
- Clade: Angiosperms
- Clade: Eudicots
- Clade: Rosids
- Order: Sapindales
- Family: Anacardiaceae
- Subfamily: Anacardioideae
- Genus: Trichoscypha; Hook.f. (1862)

Synonyms
- Emiliomarcelia T.Durand & H.Durand (1909)

= Trichoscypha =

Genus of flowering plants

Trichoscypha is a genus of plants in the family Anacardiaceae. It includes 32 species native to tropical Africa.

- Trichoscypha acuminata Engl.
- Trichoscypha arborea (A.Chev.) A.Chev.
- Trichoscypha baldwinii Keay
- Trichoscypha barbata Breteler
- Trichoscypha bijuga Engl.
- Trichoscypha blydeniae Breteler
- Trichoscypha bracteata Breteler
- Trichoscypha cavalliensis Aubrev. & Pellegr.
- Trichoscypha debruijnii Breteler
- Trichoscypha eugong Engl. & Brehmer
- Trichoscypha hallei Breteler
- Trichoscypha imbricata Engl.
- Trichoscypha laxiflora Engl.
- Trichoscypha laxissima Breteler
- Trichoscypha liberica Engl.
- Trichoscypha linderi Breteler
- Trichoscypha longifolia (Hook.f.) Engl.
- Trichoscypha longipetala Baker f.
- Trichoscypha lucens Oliv.
- Trichoscypha mannii Hook.f.
- Trichoscypha nyangensis Pellegr.
- Trichoscypha oddonii De Wild.
- Trichoscypha oliveri Engl.
- Trichoscypha olodiana Breteler
- Trichoscypha parviflora Engl.
- Trichoscypha patens (Oliv.) Engl.
- Trichoscypha pauciflora Van der Veken
- Trichoscypha reygaertii De Wild.
- Trichoscypha rubicunda Lecomte
- Trichoscypha smythei Hutch. & Dalziel
- Trichoscypha ulugurensis Mildbr.
- Trichoscypha wilksii Breteler
