= Cardenasiodendron =

Conservation status
- Near Threatened (IUCN 3.1)

Scientific classification
- Kingdom: Plantae
- Clade: Tracheophytes
- Clade: Angiosperms
- Clade: Eudicots
- Clade: Rosids
- Order: Sapindales
- Family: Anacardiaceae
- Subfamily: Anacardioideae
- Genus: Cardenasiodendron; F.A.Barkley
- Species: C. brachypterum

Binomial name
- Cardenasiodendron brachypterum (Loes.) F.A.Barkley

Synonyms
- Loxopterygium brachypterum Loes.

Genus of trees

Cardenasiodendron is a monotypic genus of dioecious trees in the subfamily Anacardioideae of the cashew and sumac family Anacardiaceae. It contains the single species Cardenasiodendron brachypterum, which is endemic to Bolivia.
