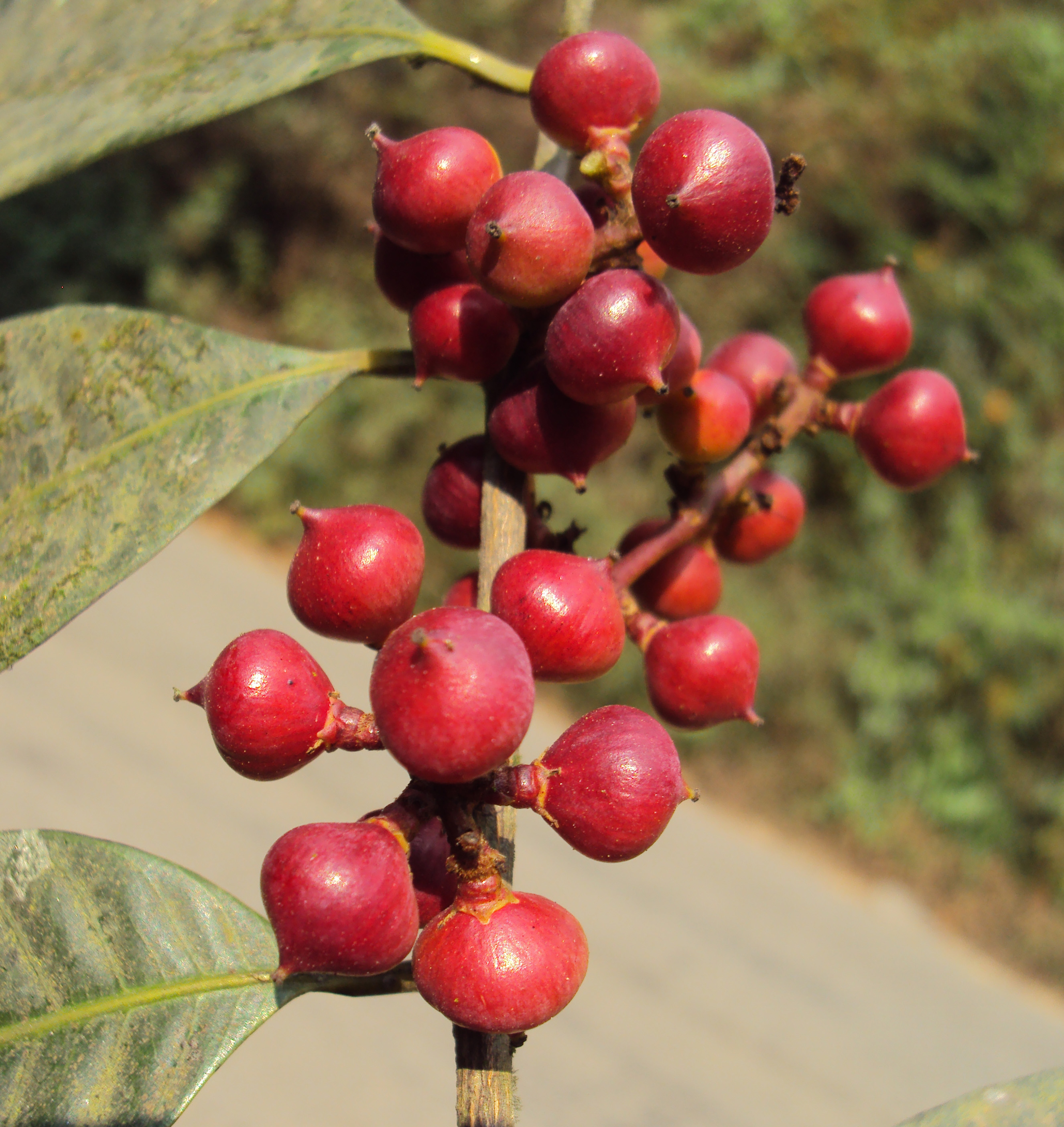
- Nothopegia beddomei fruits

Scientific classification
- Kingdom: Plantae
- Clade: Tracheophytes
- Clade: Angiosperms
- Clade: Eudicots
- Clade: Rosids
- Order: Sapindales
- Family: Anacardiaceae
- Subfamily: Anacardioideae
- Genus: Nothopegia; Blume (1850)

Synonyms
- Glycicarpus Dalzell (1849)

= Nothopegia =

Genus of flowering plants

Nothopegia is a genus of plants in the family Anacardiaceae, native to India, Bangladesh, and Sri Lanka. Out of 11 species only 8 are reported to occur in India. This genus is characterised by small deciduous trees with simple leaves, racemose inflorescence, unisexual tetramerous flowers and drupaceaous fruits Except Nothopegia heyneana (Hook. f.) Gamble, all other species are restricted to the Western Ghats and SW India.

Species include:

- Nothopegia acuminata J.Sinclair
- Nothopegia aureofulva Bedd. ex Hook.f.
- Nothopegia beddomei Gamble
- Nothopegia castaneifolia (Roth) Ding Hou
- Nothopegia colebrookeana (Wight) Blume
- Nothopegia heyneana (Hook.f.) Gamble
- Nothopegia monadelpha (Roxb.) Forman
- Nothopegia sivagiriana Murugan & Manickam
- Nothopegia travancorica Bedd. ex Hook.f.
- Nothopegia vajravelui K.Ravik. & V.Lakshm.
