= Campylopetalum =

Scientific classification
- Kingdom: Plantae
- Clade: Tracheophytes
- Clade: Angiosperms
- Clade: Eudicots
- Clade: Rosids
- Order: Sapindales
- Family: Anacardiaceae
- Subfamily: Anacardioideae
- Genus: Campylopetalum; Forman
- Species: C. siamense

Binomial name
- Campylopetalum siamense Forman

Genus of flowering plants

Campylopetalum is a monotypic genus of shrubs (specifically suffrutex) in the subfamily Anacardioideae of the cashew and sumac family Anacardiaceae. It contains the single species Campylopetalum siamense, which is endemic to northern Thailand.
