= Dobinea =

Scientific classification
- Kingdom: Plantae
- Clade: Tracheophytes
- Clade: Angiosperms
- Clade: Eudicots
- Clade: Rosids
- Order: Sapindales
- Family: Anacardiaceae
- Subfamily: Anacardioideae
- Genus: Dobinea; Buch.-Ham. ex D.Don

Species
- See text

Synonyms
- Podoon Baill.

Genus of flowering plants

Dobinea is a small genus of plants in the subfamily Anacardioideae of the cashew and sumac family Anacardiaceae. The species are dioecious and grow as shrubs or perennial herbs. They grow naturally in the East Himalaya region and China.

== Species ==
The Plant List and Flora of China recognise 2 accepted species:

- Dobinea delavayi (Baill.) Baill.
- Dobinea vulgaris Buch.-Ham. ex D.Don
