= Faguetia =

Conservation status
- Vulnerable (IUCN 3.1)

Scientific classification
- Kingdom: Plantae
- Clade: Tracheophytes
- Clade: Angiosperms
- Clade: Eudicots
- Clade: Rosids
- Order: Sapindales
- Family: Anacardiaceae
- Subfamily: Anacardioideae
- Genus: Faguetia; Marchand
- Species: F. falcata

Binomial name
- Faguetia falcata Marchand

Genus of trees

Faguetia is a monotypic genus of trees in the subfamily Anacardioideae of the cashew and sumac family Anacardiaceae. It contains the single species Faguetia falcata, which is endemic to eastern Madagascar.

== Range and habitat ==
Faguetia falcata is native to eastern Madagascar, where it is found in southern Analanjirofo and northern Atsinanana provinces, from Soanierana Ivongo in the north to Ambila Lemaitso in the south. There are seven known subpopulations.

It is found in humid littoral forests between sea level and 500 meters elevation.

The species is threatened by habitat loss from deforestation, caused by subsistence logging, wood harvesting for charcoal production, shifting cultivation, and human-caused fires. The species' population is declining, and it is assessed as vulnerable.
