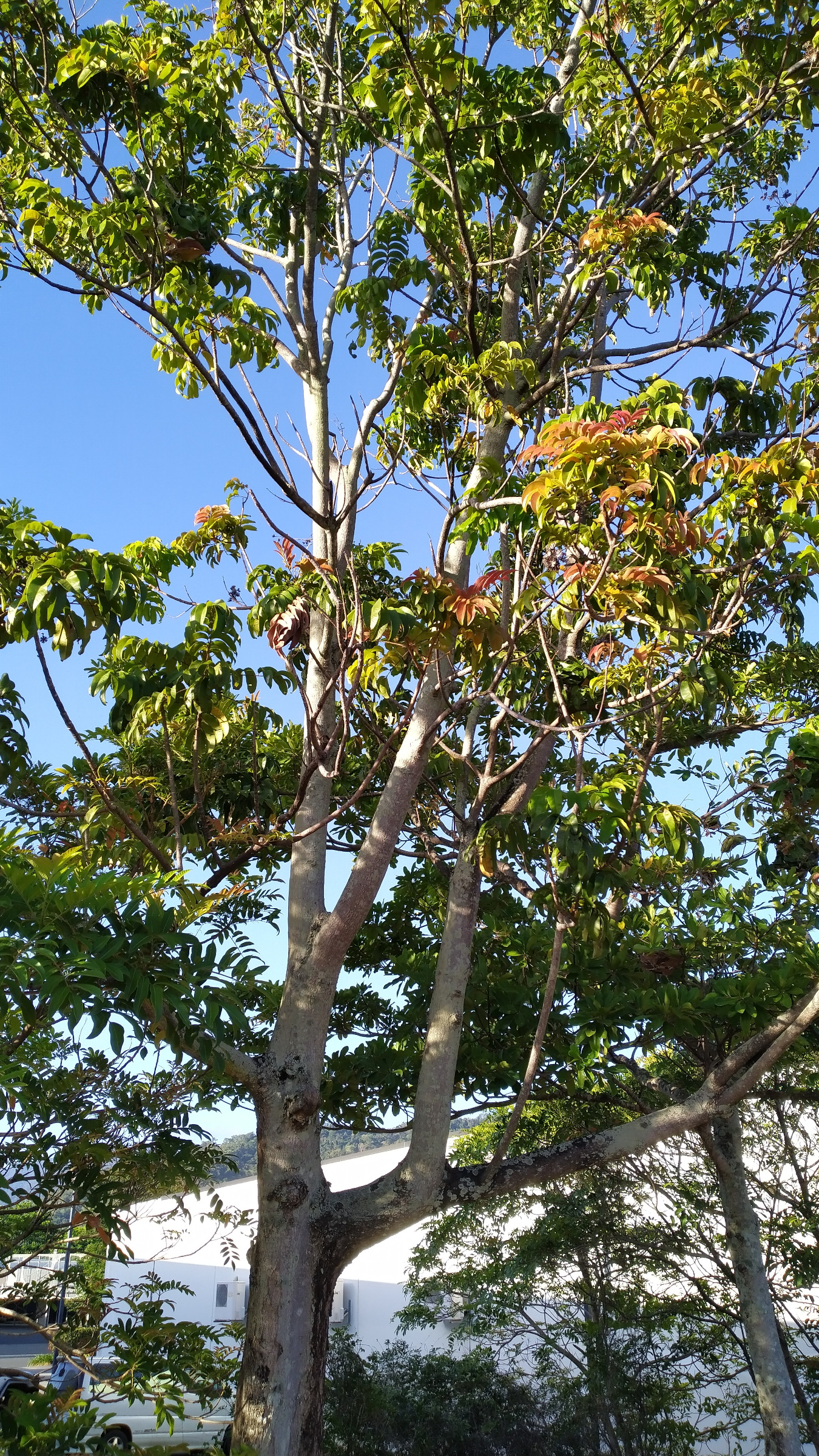

Conservation status
- Least Concern (NCA)

Scientific classification
- Kingdom: Plantae
- Clade: Tracheophytes
- Clade: Angiosperms
- Clade: Eudicots
- Clade: Rosids
- Order: Sapindales
- Family: Anacardiaceae
- Genus: Blepharocarya
- Species: B. involucrigera

Binomial name
- Blepharocarya involucrigera F.Muell.

= Blepharocarya involucrigera =

Rose butternut

Species of tree endemic to Queensland, Australia

Blepharocarya involucrigera is a tree in the mango and cashew family Anacardiaceae. It is endemic to Queensland, Australia. Common names include north Queensland bollygum, northern bollygum and rose butternut.

== Description ==
Blepharocarya involucrigera grows best in well developed rainforest, where it can reach 40 m (130 ft) in height with a dense rounded canopy, but in marginal habitats it may only reach 15 m (49 ft). The leaves are compound with 10 to 18 opposite leaflets, up to 15 cm (5.9 in) long and up to 4.5 cm (1.8 in) wide, elliptic to ovate in shape. Mature leaves are dark green above and paler beneath, while new growth is a rosy red. Above the basal pair of leaflets the rachis is flattened on the upper surface with angular edges (tending to winged).

Large terminal panicles of small, pale green to white flowers appear in the spring. This species is dioecious, that is, male and female flowers appear on separate plants.

Fruits are small and flattened, around 4 mm (0.16 in) long by 8 mm (0.31 in) wide, with small hairs along the margins. They are enclosed within a green, fibrous involucre, which dries and opens to release the fruit, becoming brown and woody in the process. The dry involucres may persist on the tree for some time and are often found on the ground underneath mature trees. This very distinctive fruit and the flattened rachis make easily recognisable key identifiers for the species.

== Range and habitat ==
This species grows in rainforest, monsoon forest and vine thickets from the Torres Strait islands and Cape York Peninsula south to the Atherton Tableland and the adjacent coastal areas, and from sea level to 800 m (2,600 ft).

== Taxonomy ==
The species was formally described in 1878 by Victorian Government botanist Ferdinand von Mueller in the 11th volume of his Fragmenta Phytographiae Australiae based on plant material collected near the Endeavour River in north-east Queensland.

=== Etymology ===
The name Blepharocarya comes from the Ancient Greek blepharon (eyelid), and carya (nut), which refers to the fruit having hairs around the margin and resembling an eyelid. The specific epithet comes from the Latin involucrum (a whorl of bracts around flowers or fruit), and gero (bearing or borne on).

== Toxicity ==
As with many other plants in the Anacardiaceae family, contact with the resin or other parts of the tree can cause severe allergic reactions including dermatitis, conjunctivitis, and headaches. Individuals may become increasingly sensitised to contact with any part of the tree.

== Uses ==
The tree produces a decorative timber that has been used for cabinetmaking, flooring and cooperage. Fruits are eaten by double-eyed fig parrots and king parrots

== Gallery ==
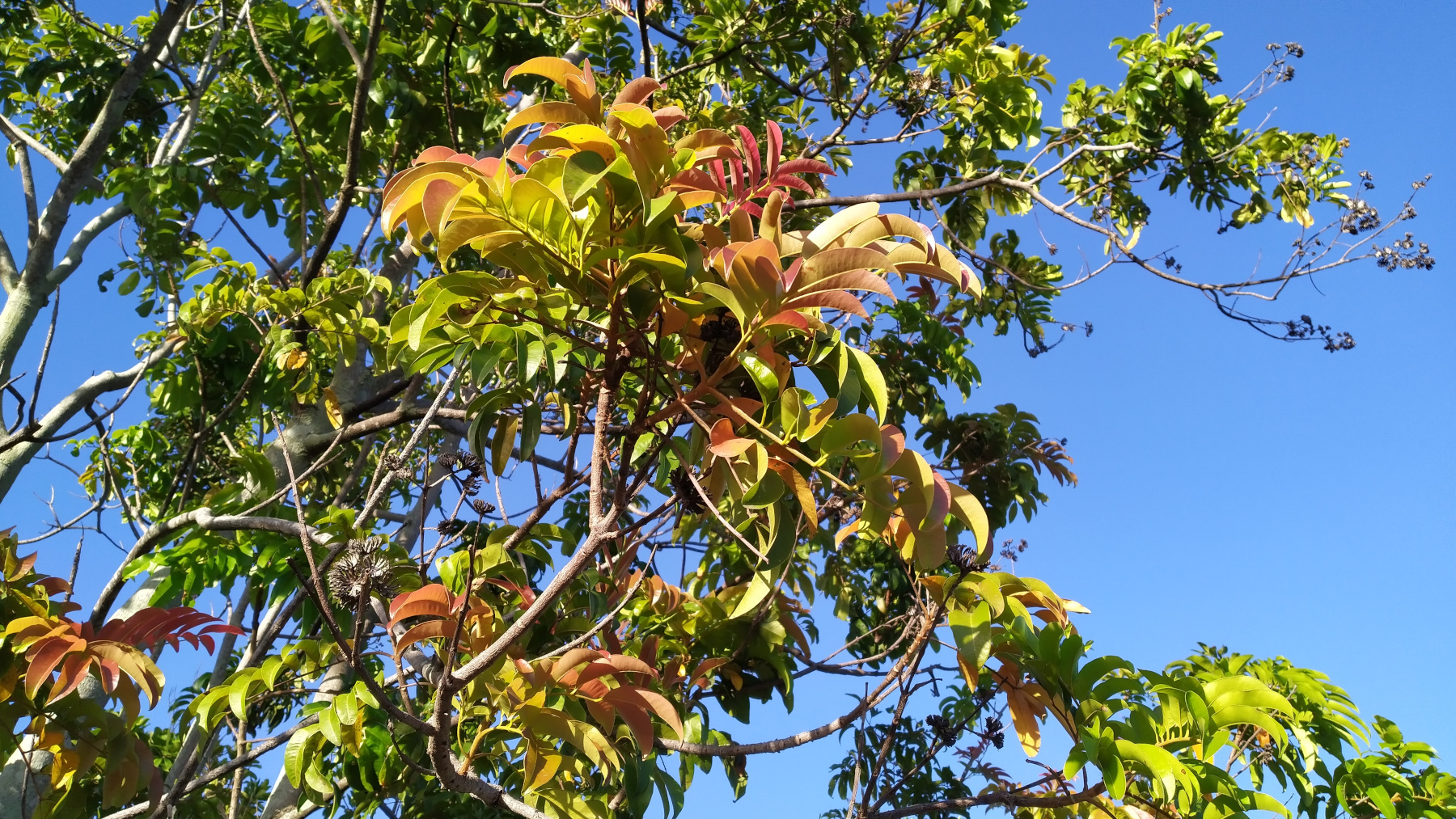
Colourful new growth

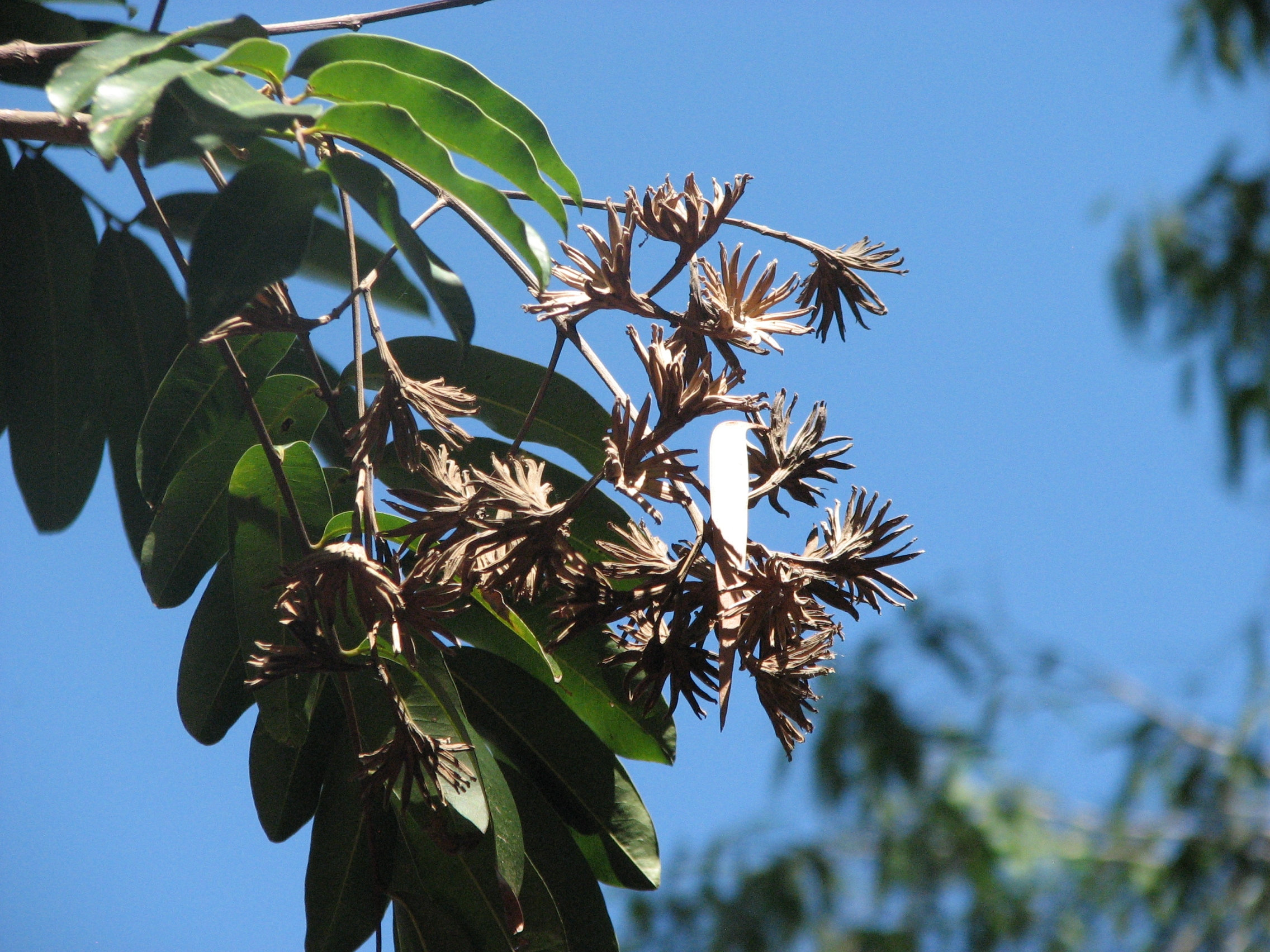
At Kewarra Beach, Queensland

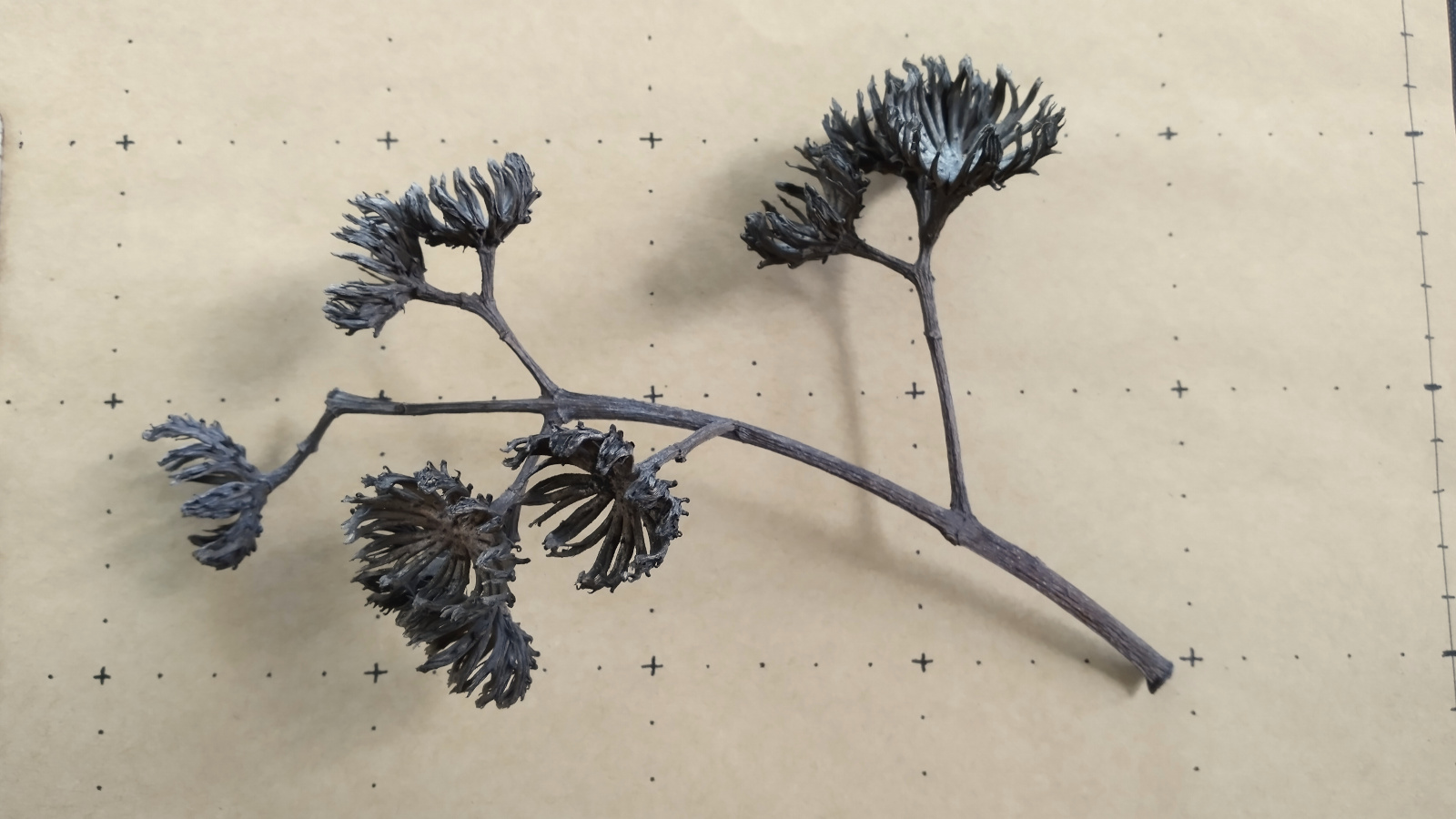
Dried involucres

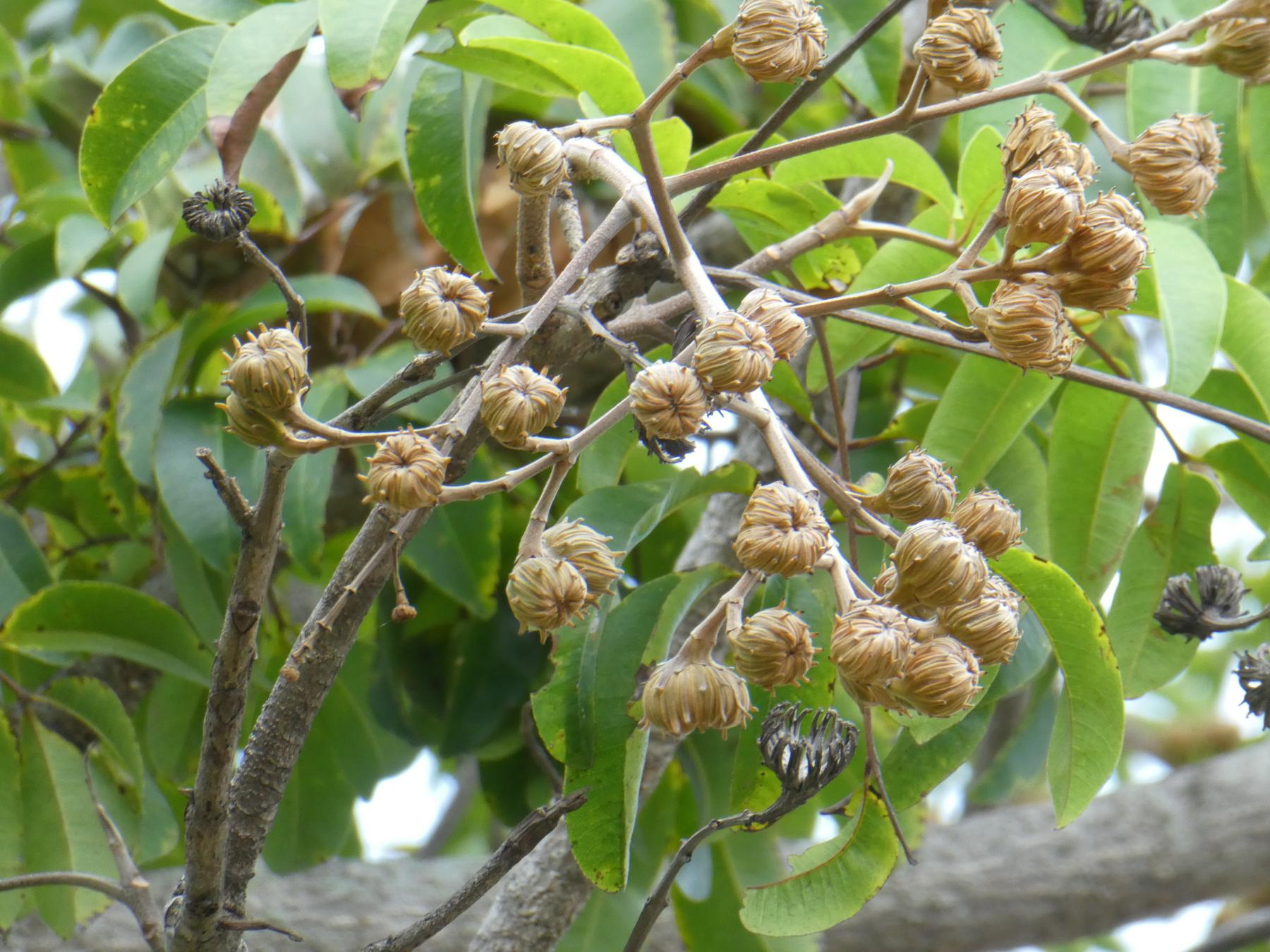
Ripening fruits

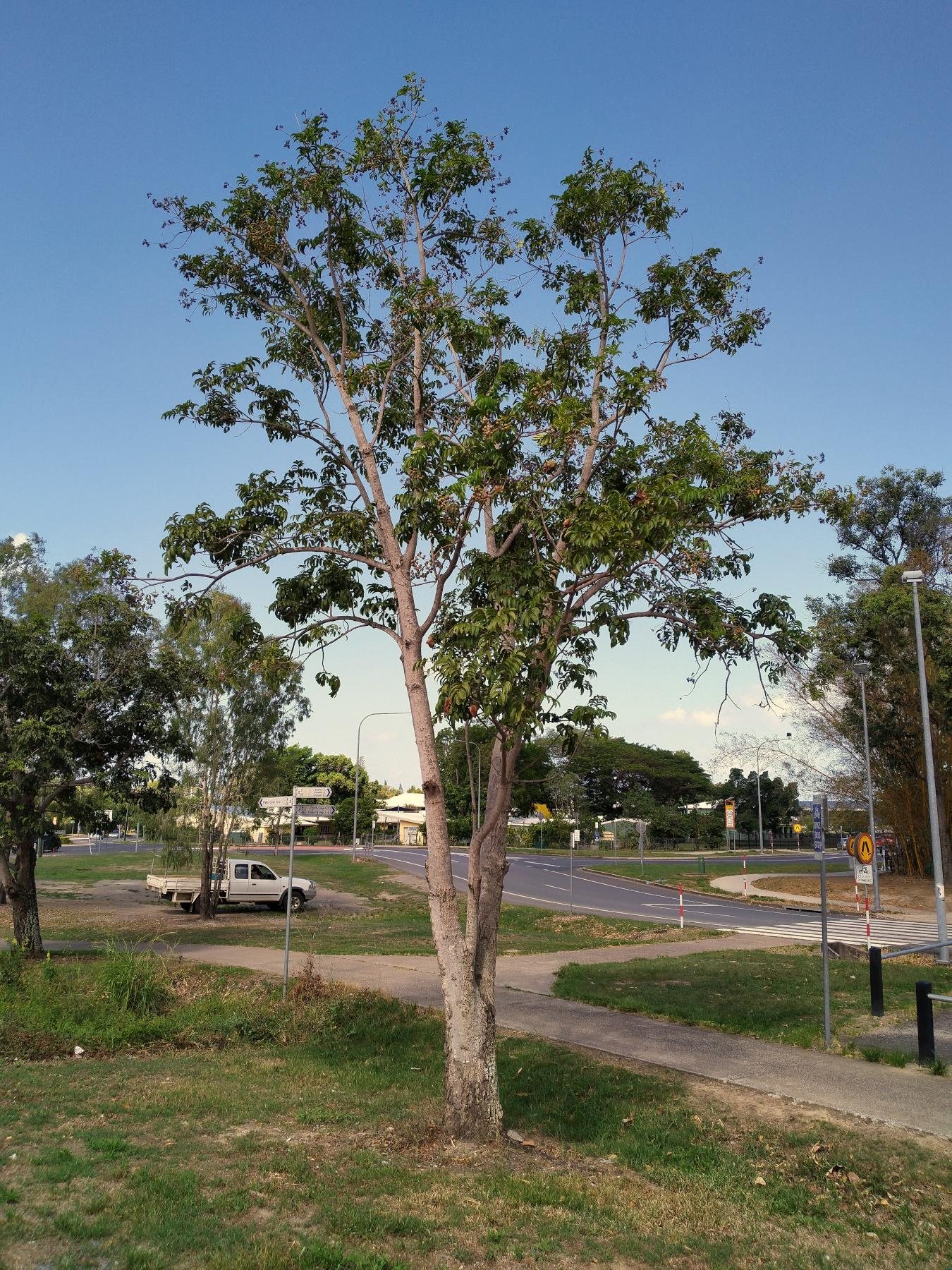
Mature tree in Smithfield, Queensland
