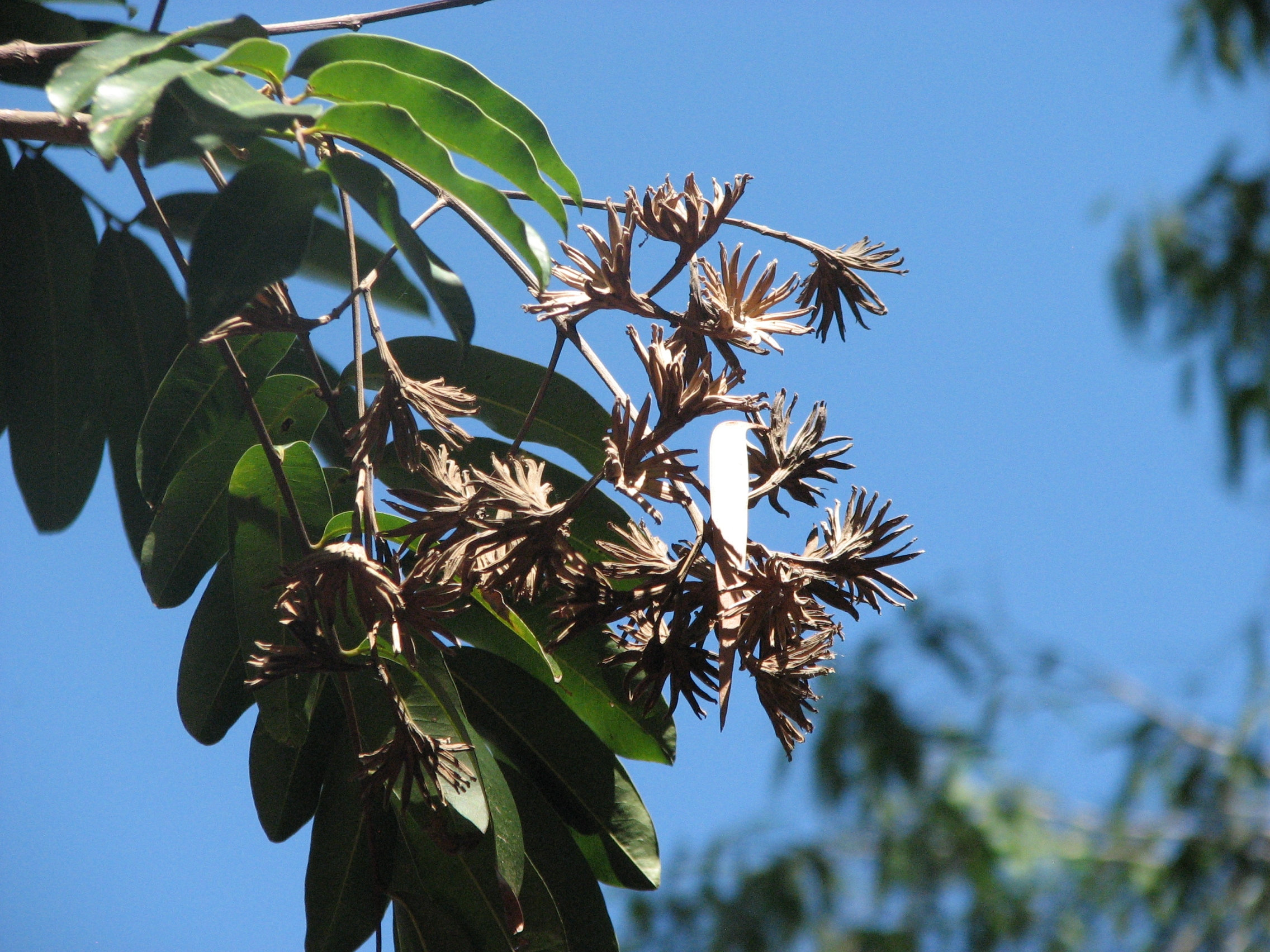
- Blepharocarya involucrigera

Scientific classification
- Kingdom: Plantae
- Clade: Tracheophytes
- Clade: Angiosperms
- Clade: Eudicots
- Clade: Rosids
- Order: Sapindales
- Family: Anacardiaceae
- Subfamily: Anacardioideae
- Genus: Blepharocarya; F.Muell.

Species
- See text

= Blepharocarya =

Genus of trees

Blepharocarya is a genus of trees from northern Australia, in the family Anacardiaceae. They are dioecious trees with opposite leaves, a trait rather unusual within the Anacardiaceae.

Species include:

- Blepharocarya depauperata Specht
- Blepharocarya involucrigera F.Muell.
