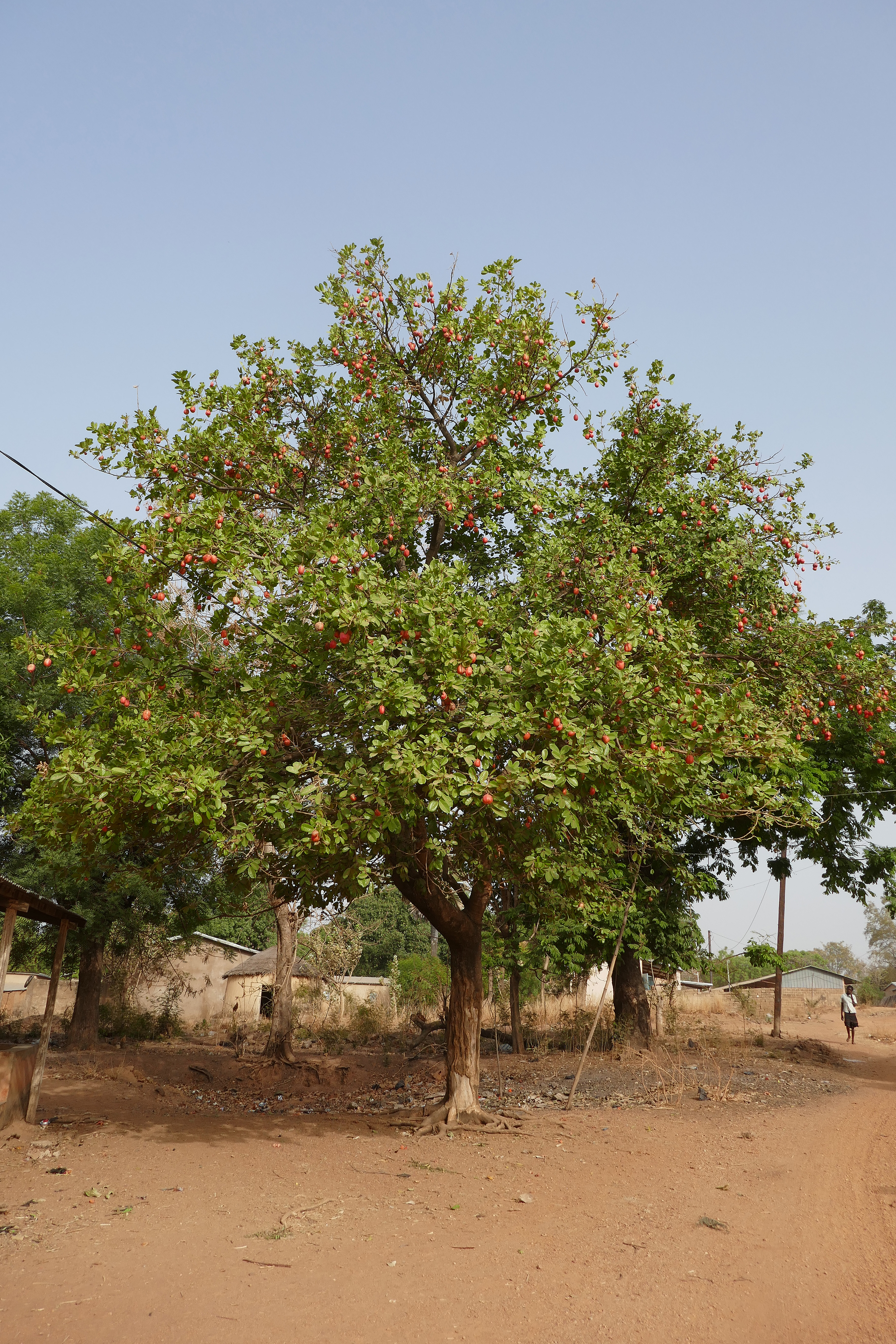

Scientific classification
- Kingdom: Plantae
- Clade: Tracheophytes
- Clade: Angiosperms
- Clade: Eudicots
- Clade: Rosids
- Order: Sapindales
- Family: Anacardiaceae
- Subfamily: Anacardioideae
- Genus: Fegimanra; Pierre

Species
- See text

= Fegimanra =

Genus of flowering plants

Fegimanra is a small genus of trees in the subfamily Anacardioideae of the cashew and sumac family Anacardiaceae. They grow naturally in west and west-central tropical Africa.

== Species ==
The Plant List and Catalogue of Life recognise 3 accepted species:

- Fegimanra acuminatissima Keay
- Fegimanra africana (Oliv.) Pierre
- Fegimanra afzelii Engl.
