= Bonetiella =

Scientific classification
- Kingdom: Plantae
- Clade: Tracheophytes
- Clade: Angiosperms
- Clade: Eudicots
- Clade: Rosids
- Order: Sapindales
- Family: Anacardiaceae
- Subfamily: Anacardioideae
- Genus: Bonetiella; Rzed.
- Species: B. anomala

Binomial name
- Bonetiella anomala (I.M.Johnst.) Rzed.

Synonyms
- Pseudosmodingium anomalum I.M.Johnst.

Genus of flowering plants

Bonetiella is a monotypic genus of shrubs in the subfamily Anacardioideae of the cashew and sumac family Anacardiaceae. It contains the single species Bonetiella anomala, which is endemic to northern and central Mexico.
