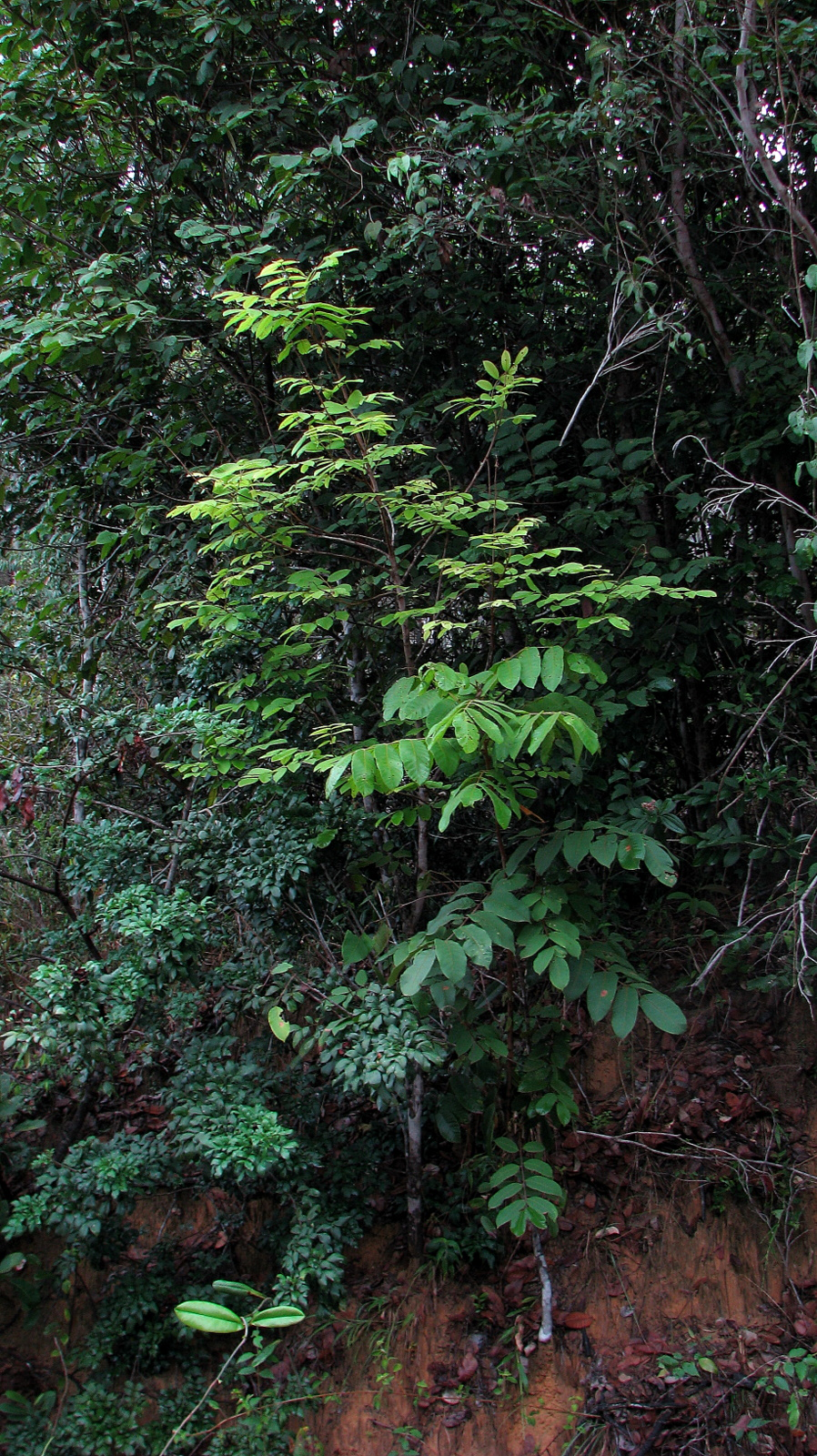
- Thyrsodium spruceanum

Scientific classification
- Kingdom: Plantae
- Clade: Tracheophytes
- Clade: Angiosperms
- Clade: Eudicots
- Clade: Rosids
- Order: Sapindales
- Family: Anacardiaceae
- Subfamily: Anacardioideae
- Genus: Thyrsodium; Salzm. ex Benth. (1852)

= Thyrsodium =

Genus of plants

Thyrsodium is a genus of plants in the family Anacardiaceae. It includes six species native to tropical South America, from Colombia to Bolivia and southeastern Brazil.

== Taxonomy ==
=== Species ===
As of January 2024, Plants of the World Online accepts six species:

- Thyrsodium bolivianum J.D.Mitch. & Daly
- Thyrsodium guianense Sagot ex Marchand
- Thyrsodium herrerense Encarnacion
- Thyrsodium puberulum J.D.Mitch. & Daly
- Thyrsodium rondonianum J.D.Mitch. & Daly
- Thyrsodium spruceanum Benth.
