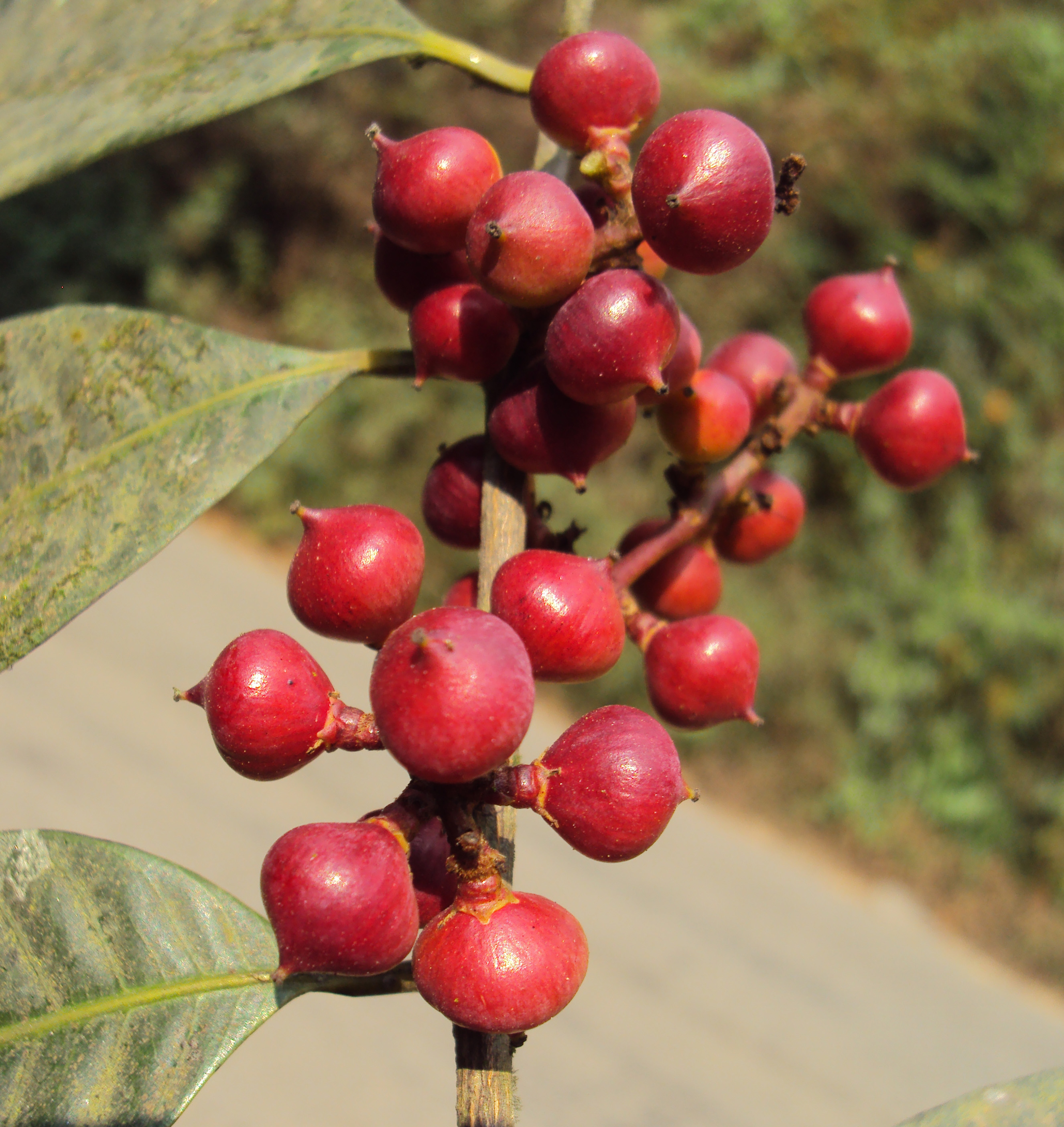
- Nothopegia beddomei fruits

Scientific classification
- Kingdom: Plantae
- Clade: Tracheophytes
- Clade: Angiosperms
- Clade: Eudicots
- Clade: Rosids
- Order: Sapindales
- Family: Anacardiaceae
- Genus: Nothopegia
- Species: N. beddomei

Binomial name
- Nothopegia beddomei Gamble

= Nothopegia beddomei =

Species of flowering plant

Nothopegia beddomei, also known as Western Ghats Top-Fruit Tree, is a species of plant in the family Anacardiaceae. It is found in India and Sri Lanka. The tree is primarily found in the Western Ghats region of India, which extends along the western coast of the country, spanning states like Maharashtra, Karnataka, Kerala and Tamil Nadu.

The Western Ghats Top-Fruit Tree is a 12-metre tall tree with a finely fissured, pinkish-brown bark and slender, hairless branches. Its leaves are simple, spirally arranged, narrow and glaucous beneath, with wavy margins and a papery texture, measuring 6–16 cm in length and 1.2-4.5 cm in width. The stalks are 0.6-1.5 cm long. The tree produces small, 4-lobed flowers in axillary racemes, with a compressed, top-shaped drupe containing one seed. This species is found in the Western Ghats and Sri Lanka, with its flowering period occurring from April to June.

The tree is threatened by habitat loss.

== Culture ==
Known as "bala" (බල) in Sinhala.

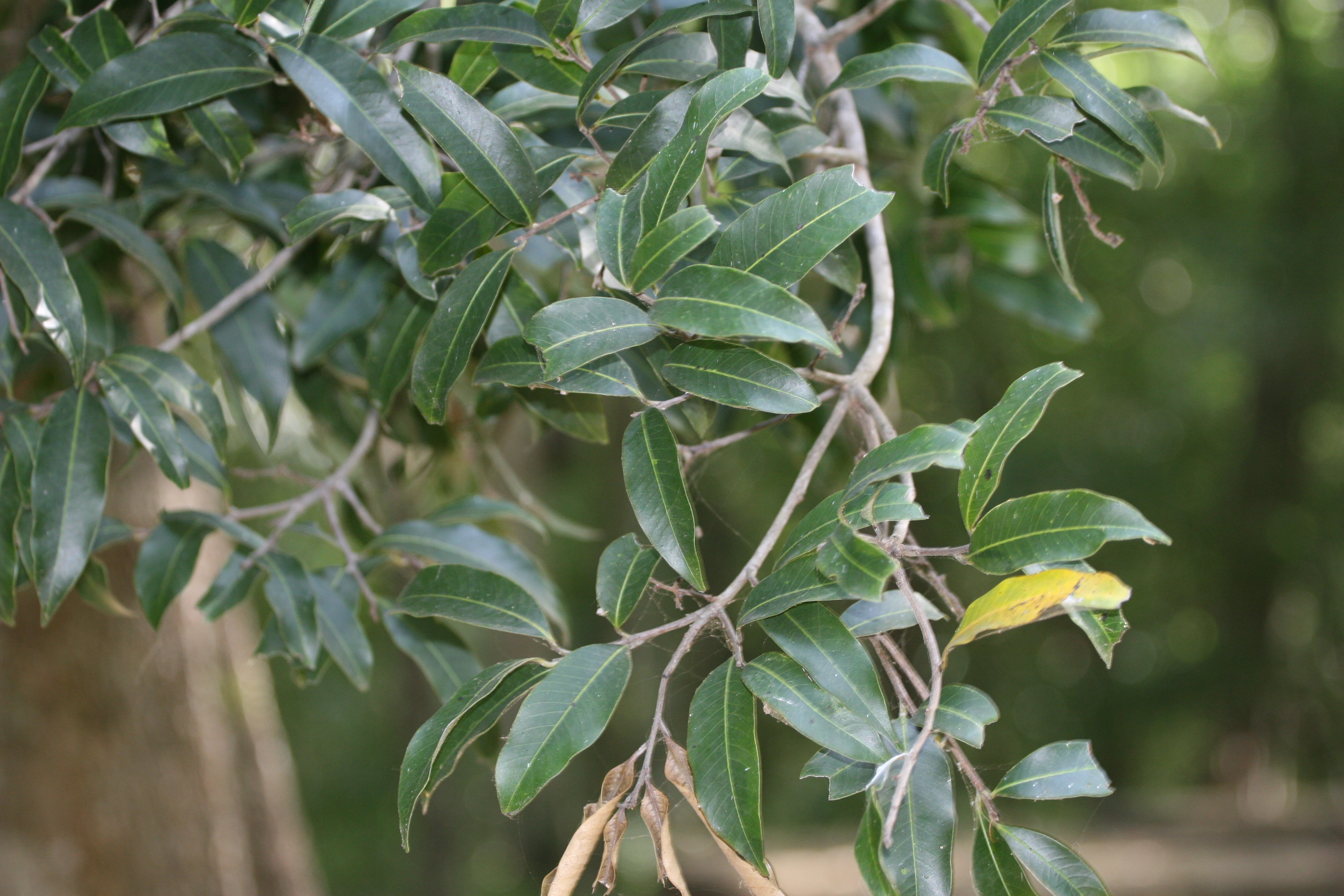
Leaves
