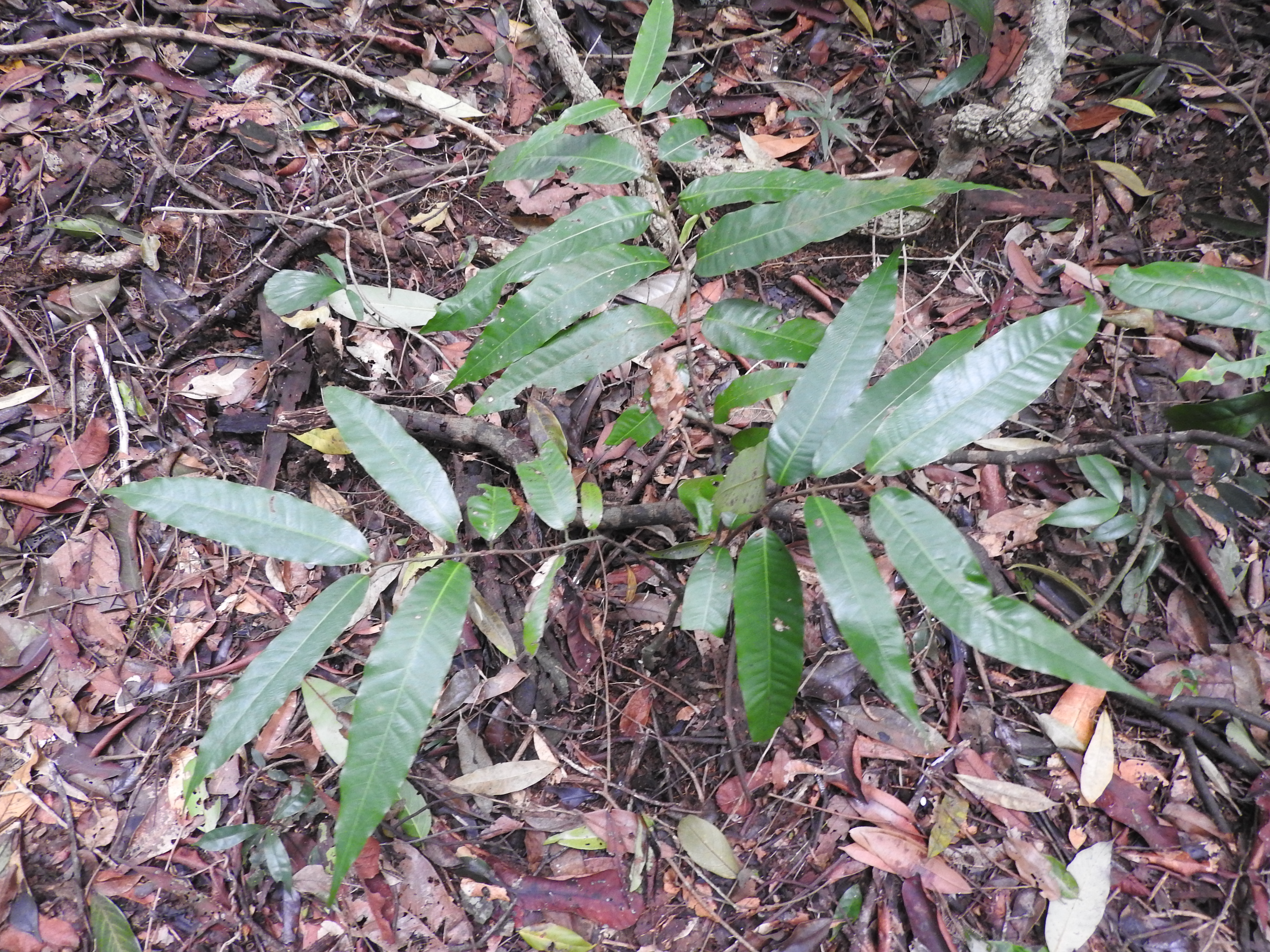

Scientific classification
- Kingdom: Plantae
- Clade: Tracheophytes
- Clade: Angiosperms
- Clade: Eudicots
- Clade: Rosids
- Order: Sapindales
- Family: Anacardiaceae
- Genus: Nothopegia
- Species: N. travancorica

Binomial name
- Nothopegia travancorica Bedd. ex Hook.f.

= Nothopegia travancorica =

Species of flowering plant

Nothopegia travancorica is a species of plant in the family Anacardiaceae.

== Description ==
Small tree upto 5 m tall, Leaves are simple, alternate, and spirally arranged. Petiole 0.5–1.5 cm long, pubescent and canaliculate. Lamina 7–22 × 2–5 cm, elliptic-oblong to oblanceolate; apex long-acuminate to caudate; base acute; margin undulate and ciliate; texture chartaceous, glaucous beneath. Midrib flat or slightly raised above; secondary veins 20–30 pairs, prominent and nearly parallel; tertiary veins percurrent. Inflorescences are axillary or extra-axillary racemes about 1 cm long; flowers white and polygamous. Fruit a drupe, oblate, ribbed, glabrous, about 0.5 cm across, and 1-seeded.
