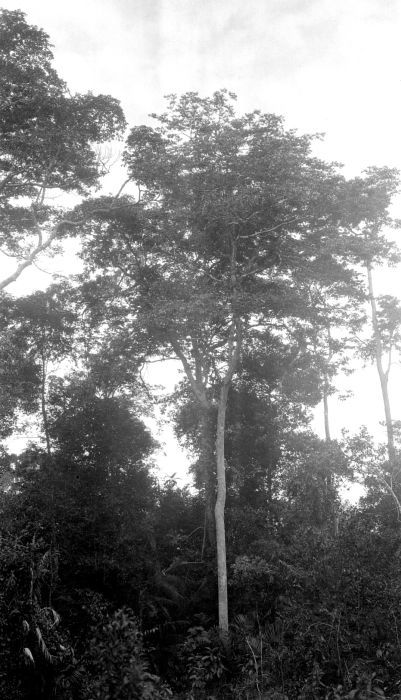
- In Borneo

Conservation status
- Data Deficient (IUCN 2.3)

Scientific classification
- Kingdom: Plantae
- Clade: Tracheophytes
- Clade: Angiosperms
- Clade: Eudicots
- Clade: Rosids
- Order: Sapindales
- Family: Anacardiaceae
- Genus: Pentaspadon
- Species: P. motleyi

Binomial name
- Pentaspadon motleyi Hook.f.

= Pentaspadon motleyi =

Species of flowering plant

Pentaspadon motleyi is a species of plant in the family Anacardiaceae. It is found in Indonesia, Malaysia, Papua New Guinea, and the Solomon Islands. It is threatened by habitat loss. Its fruit and its seeds are edible after cooking. Its timber is weak but still used locally for certain applications. It also abundantly produces an oil which is used for skin conditions.
