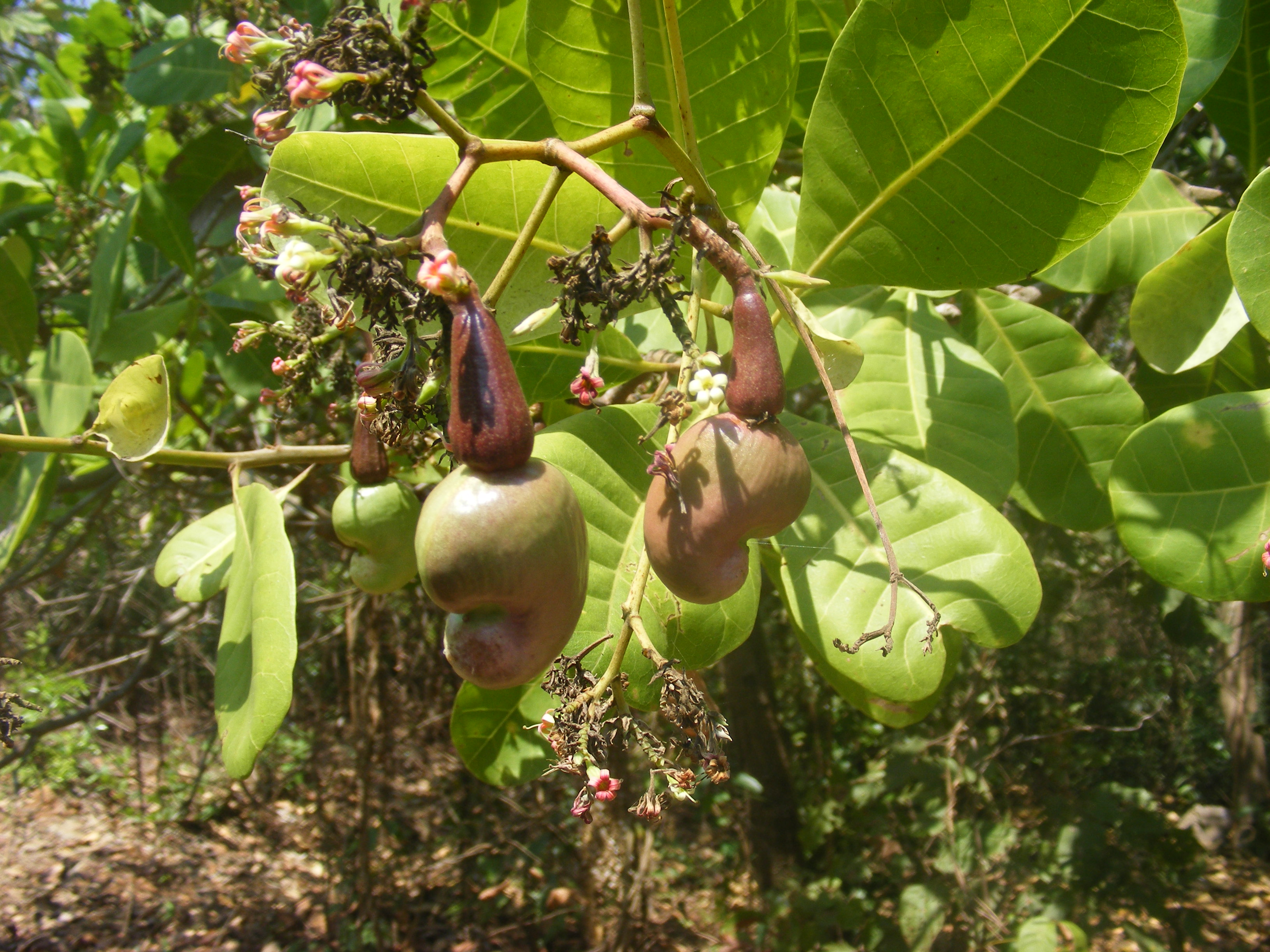
- Anacardium occidentale

Scientific classification
- Kingdom: Plantae
- Clade: Embryophytes
- Clade: Tracheophytes
- Clade: Angiosperms
- Clade: Eudicots
- Clade: Rosids
- Order: Sapindales
- Family: Anacardiaceae
- Subfamily: Anacardioideae; Takht.

Tribes
- Anacardieae; Dobineae; Rhoeae; Semecarpeae

Synonyms
- Blepharocaryaceae Airy Shaw; Comocladiaceae Martynov; Julianaceae Hemsl.; Julianiaceae; Lentiscaceae Horaninow; Pistaciaceae (Marchand) Caruel.; Podoaceae Baill. ex Franch.; Schinaceae Rafinesque; Vernicaceae Link

= Anacardioideae =

Subfamily of flowering plants

Anacardioideae is a subfamily of plants in the family Anacardiaceae.

== Genera ==
The following genera are recognised:

1. Abrahamia
2. Actinocheita
3. Amphipterygium
4. Anacardium – cashews
5. Androtium
6. Astronium (synonym Myracrodruon)
7. Attilaea
8. Baronia
9. Blepharocarya
10. Bonetiella
11. Bouea
12. Buchanania
13. Campnosperma
14. Campylopetalum
15. Cardenasiodendron
16. Comocladia – maidenplum
17. Cotinus – smoketree
18. Dobinea
19. Drimycarpus
20. Euroschinus
21. Faguetia
22. Fegimanra
23. Gluta (synonym Melanorrhoea)
24. Haplorhus
25. Heeria
26. Holigarna
27. Laurophyllus
28. Lithraea
29. Loxopterygium (synonym Apterokarpos)
30. Loxostylis
31. Malosma – laurel sumac
32. Mangifera – mango
33. Mauria
34. Melanochyla
35. Metopium – Florida poisontree
36. Micronychia
37. Mosquitoxylum
38. Nothopegia
39. Ochoterenaea
40. Orthopterygium
41. Ozoroa
42. Pachycormus
43. Parishia
44. Pentaspadon
45. Pistacia – pistachio
46. Protorhus
47. Pseudosmodingium
48. Rhodosphaera
49. Rhus – sumac
50. Schinopsis
51. Schinus – peppertree
52. Searsia
53. Semecarpus
54. Smodingium
55. Sorindeia
56. Swintonia
57. Thyrsodium
58. Toxicodendron – poison oak and poison ivy
59. Trichoscypha

== Bibliography ==
- Pell, Susan K.; Mitchell, John D.; Lowry, Porter P.; Randrianasolo, Armand; Urbatsch, Lowell E. (1 April 2008). "Phylogenetic Split of Malagasy and African Taxa of Protorhus and Rhus (Anacardiaceae) Based on cpDNA trnL–trnF and nrDNA ETS and ITS Sequence Data". Systematic Botany. 33 (2): 375–383. doi:10.1600/036364408784571545. S2CID 86329117.
- Pell, Susan Katherine (May 2004). Molecular systematics of the cashew family (Anacardiaceae) (PDF). Department of Biological Sciences, Louisiana State University. Archived from the original (PhD thesis) on 2008-08-21.
