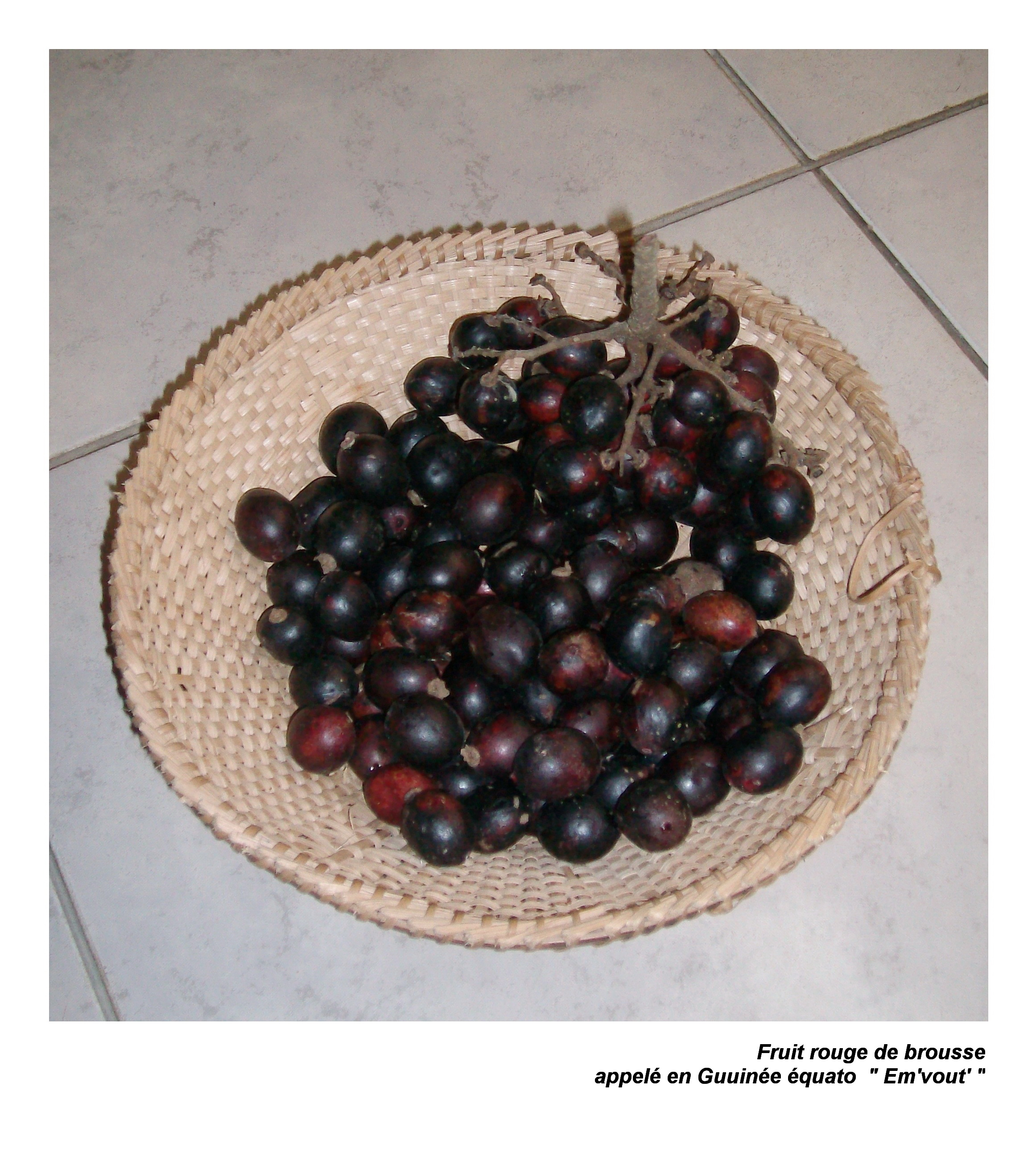

Conservation status
- Least Concern (IUCN 3.1)

Scientific classification
- Kingdom: Plantae
- Clade: Tracheophytes
- Clade: Angiosperms
- Clade: Eudicots
- Clade: Rosids
- Order: Sapindales
- Family: Anacardiaceae
- Genus: Trichoscypha
- Species: T. acuminata

Binomial name
- Trichoscypha acuminata Engl.

Synonyms
- Trichoscypha ferruginea Engl.

= Trichoscypha acuminata =

Species of flowering plant

Trichoscypha acuminata, commonly called amvout, is a species of plant in the family Anacardiaceae. It is found in Nigeria, Cameroon, Equatorial Guinea, Central African Republic, Gabon, the Congos and Angola. Mature trees reach 20m in height and leaves are up to 1.5m long. Its natural habitat is rain forest. Fruits are dark red and edible.
