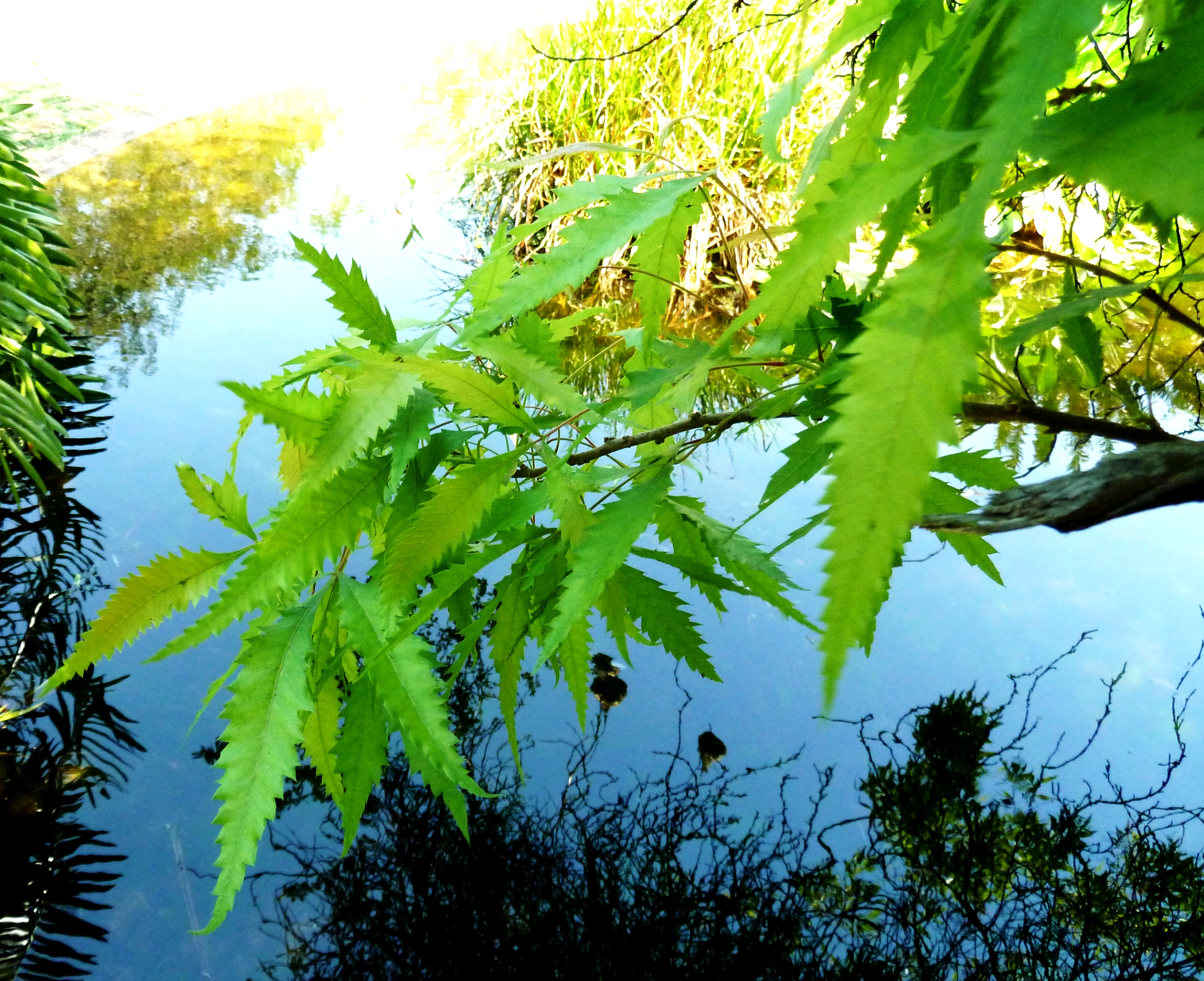

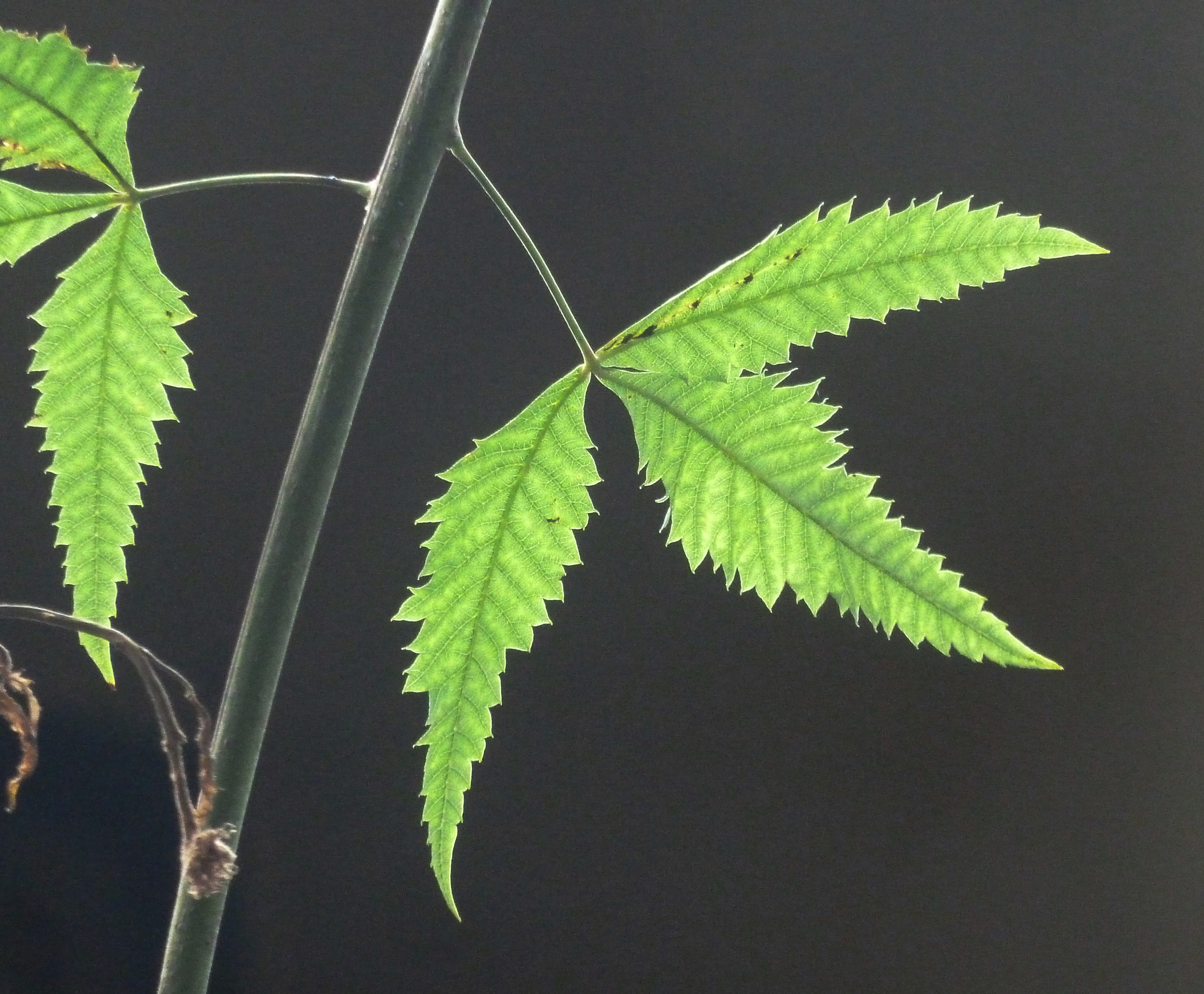
- Sprig in the Pretoria N.B.G., and a close-up view of the compound leaf

Scientific classification
- Kingdom: Plantae
- Clade: Tracheophytes
- Clade: Angiosperms
- Clade: Eudicots
- Clade: Rosids
- Order: Sapindales
- Family: Anacardiaceae
- Subfamily: Anacardioideae
- Genus: Smodingium; E.Mey. ex Sond. in Harv. & Sonder (1860)
- Species: S. argutum

Binomial name
- Smodingium argutum E.Mey. ex Sond.
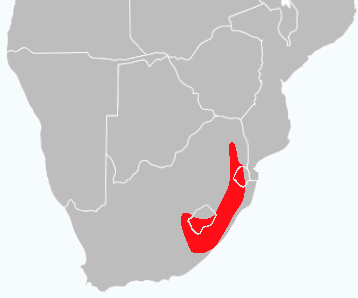
- species range

= Smodingium =

African poison ivy

Genus of trees

Smodingium argutum, the African poison ivy or pain bush, is a southern African shrub or medium-sized tree in the Anacardiaceae, which has properties comparable to the American poison ivy, as its sap contains heptadecyl catechols that are toxic to the skin.

An immuno-chemical reaction is suspected as in other toxic anacardiaceous species. It is monotypic in the genus Smodingium, and was discovered in Pondoland by J. F. Drège during an 1832 expedition with the zoologist Andrew Smith.

== Description ==
It resembles Rhus species in habit and foliage. It is very variable in size, sometimes a woody shrub barely 1–2 feet high, or otherwise a tree of up to 6m. During summer it produces small, creamy green flowers arranged in large sprays. The Greek generic name, meaning "durated mark", alludes to its hard, flattened seeds, which are fitted with papery wings. The margins of the alternately arranged, trifoliolate leaves are toothed, as suggested by its specific name, argutum, which means "sharp". The foliage assumes attractive autumn colours. When damaged the twigs exude a creamy, poisonous sap, which turns black when the catechols contained in it polymerize to a melanin.

== Range ==
It occurs along the Mpumalanga escarpment, the uplands of Eswatini, the KwaZulu-Natal midlands, Pondoland and Transkei, southern Lesotho and the southern Free State.
