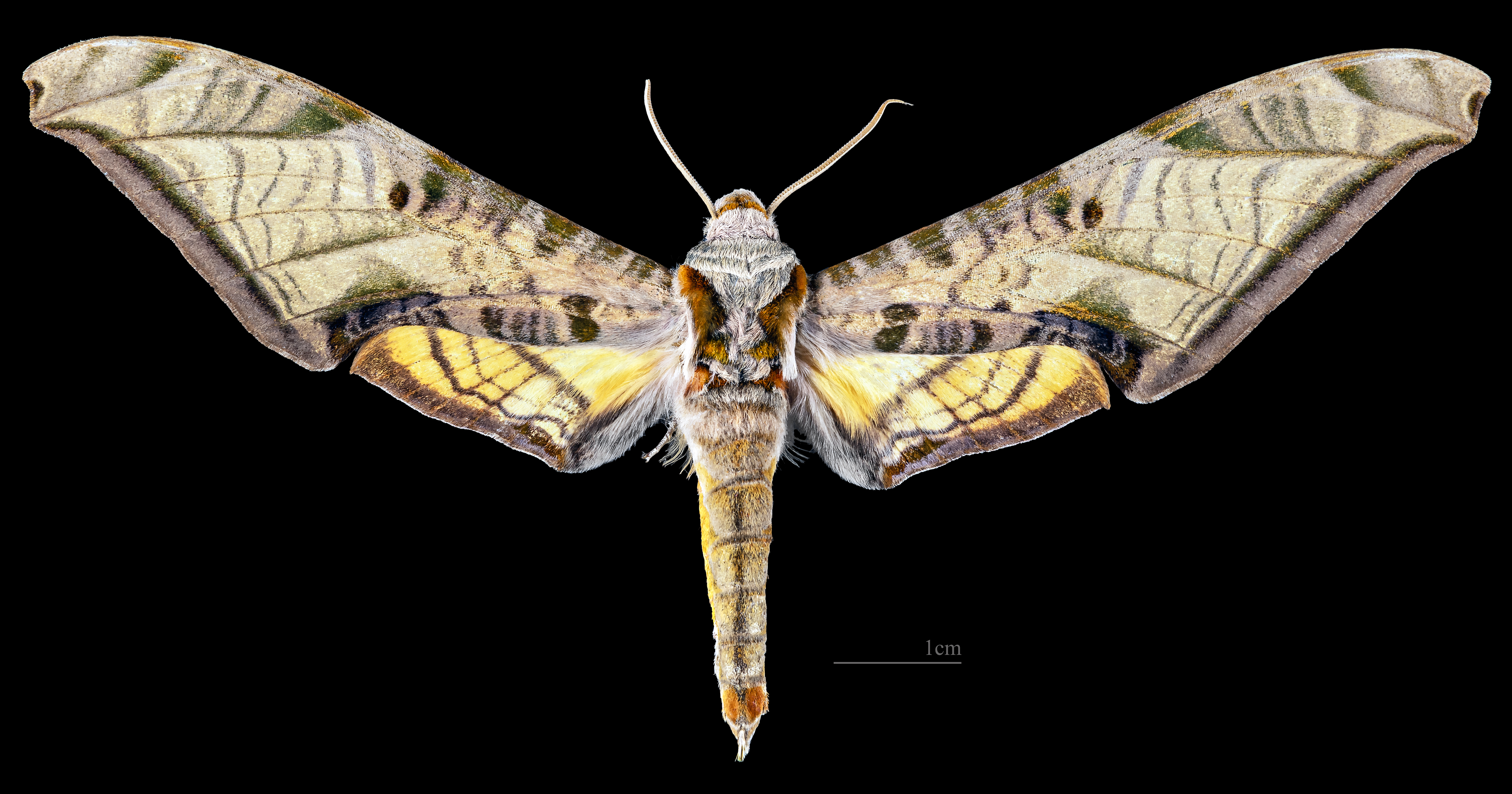
- Male dorsal
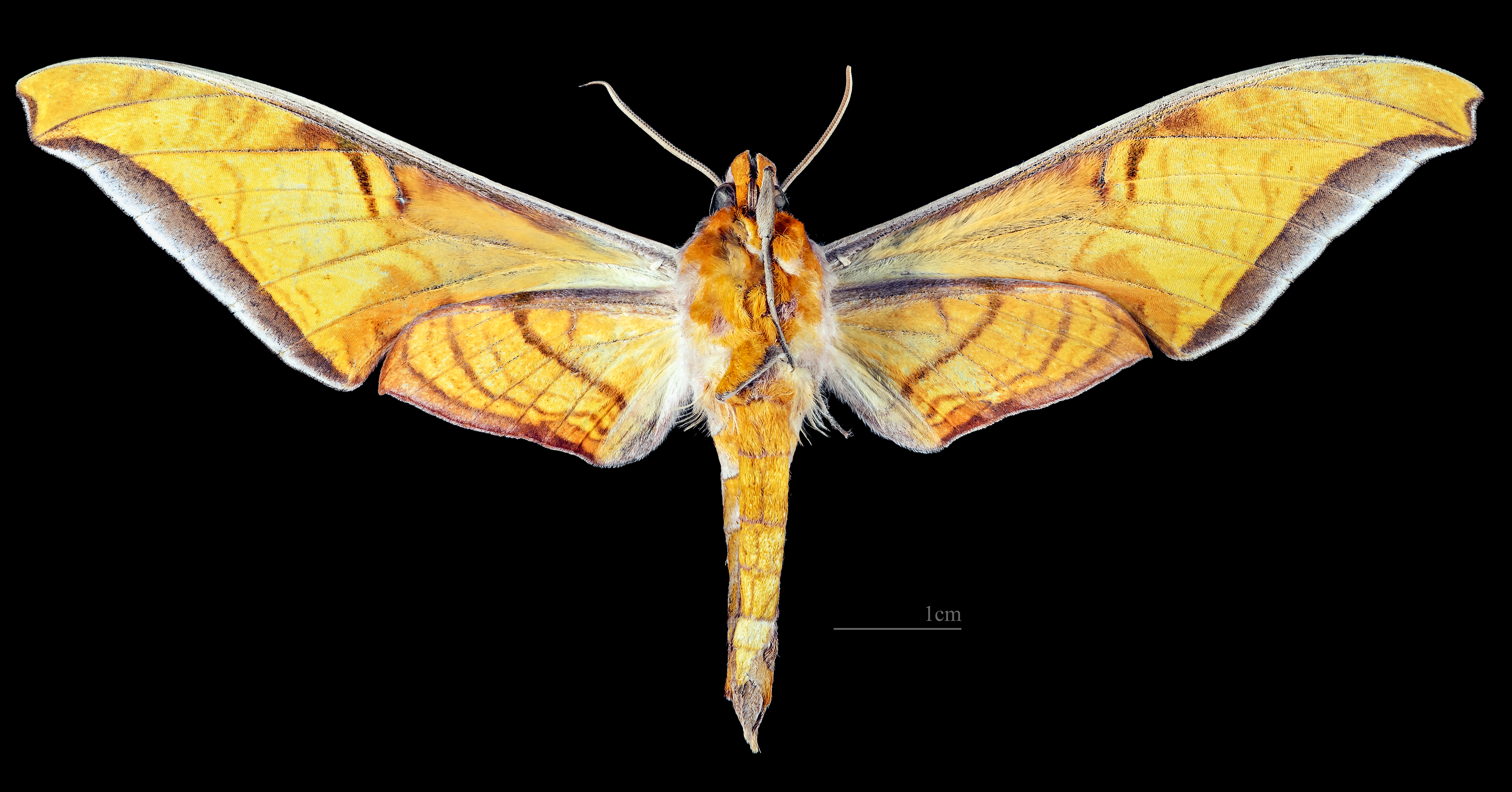
- Male ventral

Scientific classification
- Kingdom: Animalia
- Phylum: Arthropoda
- Class: Insecta
- Order: Lepidoptera
- Family: Sphingidae
- Genus: Protambulyx
- Species: P. ockendeni

Binomial name
- Protambulyx ockendeni Rothschild & Jordan, 1903

= Protambulyx ockendeni =

Species of moth

Protambulyx ockendeni is a species of moth of the family Sphingidae. It is known from Peru and much of Central America and South America. It has also been recorded in Bolivia.

The wingspan is 105–110 mm. Adults are similar to Protambulyx euryalus but the forewing upperside is less variegated and the basal half is more distinctly purplish.

Adults are probably on wing year round.

The larvae feed on Anacardium, Spondias, Erythoxylon and Comocladia species.
