= Poison ash =

Poison ash is a common name for several plants and may refer to:

- Comocladia dodonaea, native to the Caribbean
- Toxicodendron vernix, native to North America
