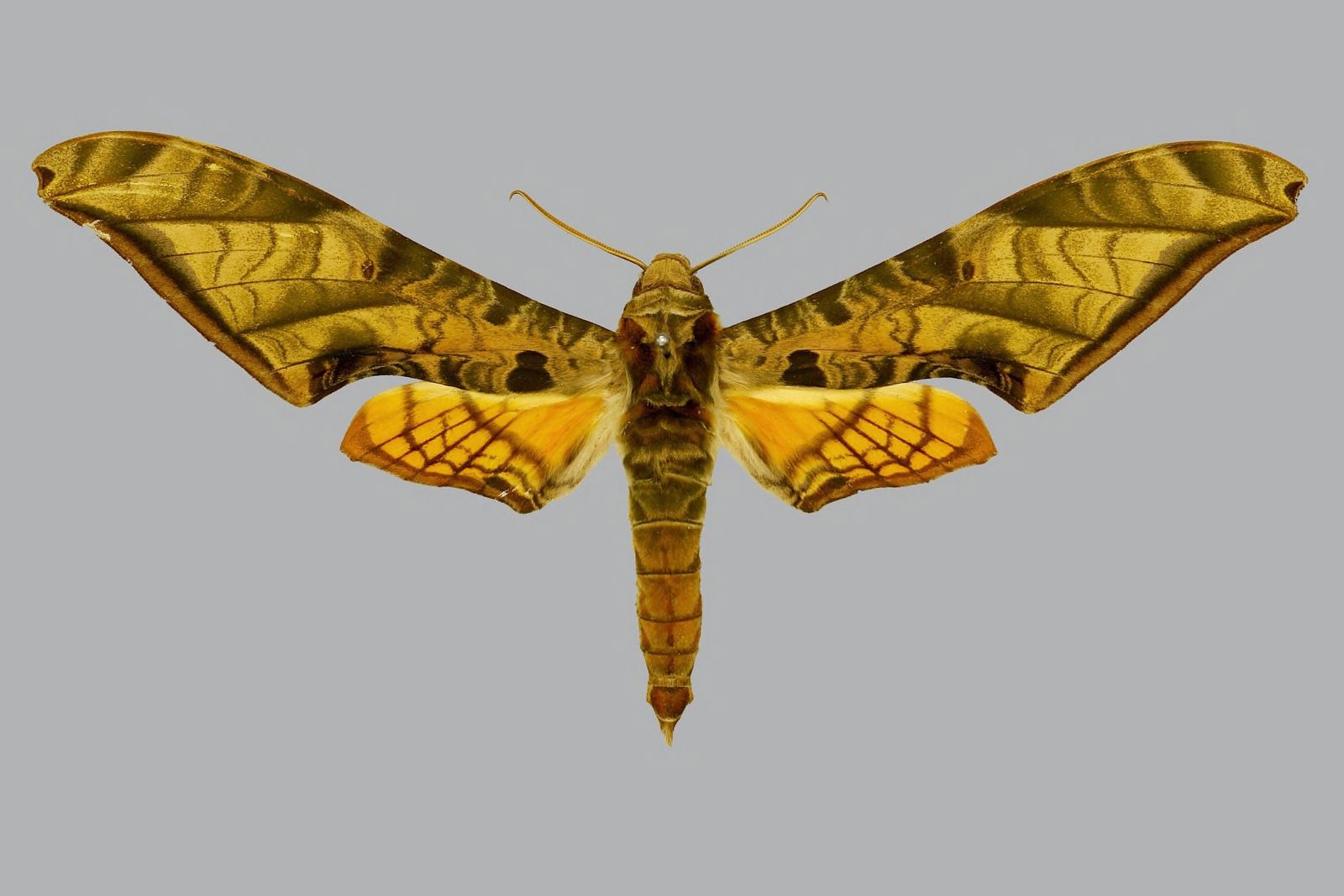

Scientific classification
- Kingdom: Animalia
- Phylum: Arthropoda
- Class: Insecta
- Order: Lepidoptera
- Family: Sphingidae
- Genus: Protambulyx
- Species: P. euryalus

Binomial name
- Protambulyx euryalus Rothschild & Jordan, 1903

= Protambulyx euryalus =

Species of moth

Protambulyx euryalus is a species of moth of the family Sphingidae. It is known from Venezuela, Colombia, Ecuador, Peru and Bolivia.

The wingspan is 105–110 mm. Adults are similar to Protambulyx eurycles but the forewing marginal band is narrower and not crenulated and the hindwing postmedian line is curved and not angled.

Adults are probably on wing year round.

The larvae feed on Anacardium, Spondias, Erythoxylon and Comocladia species.
