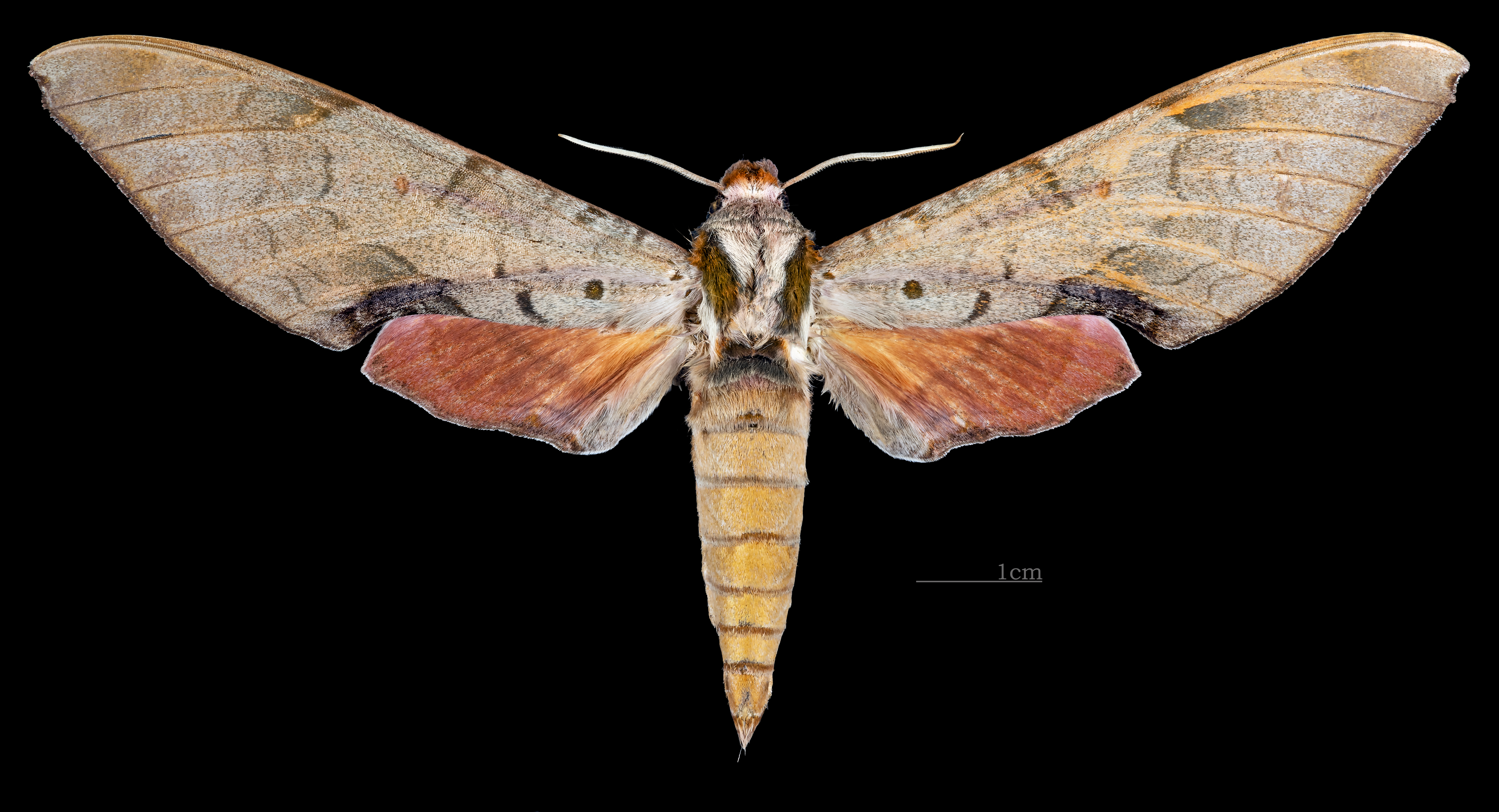
- Male dorsal
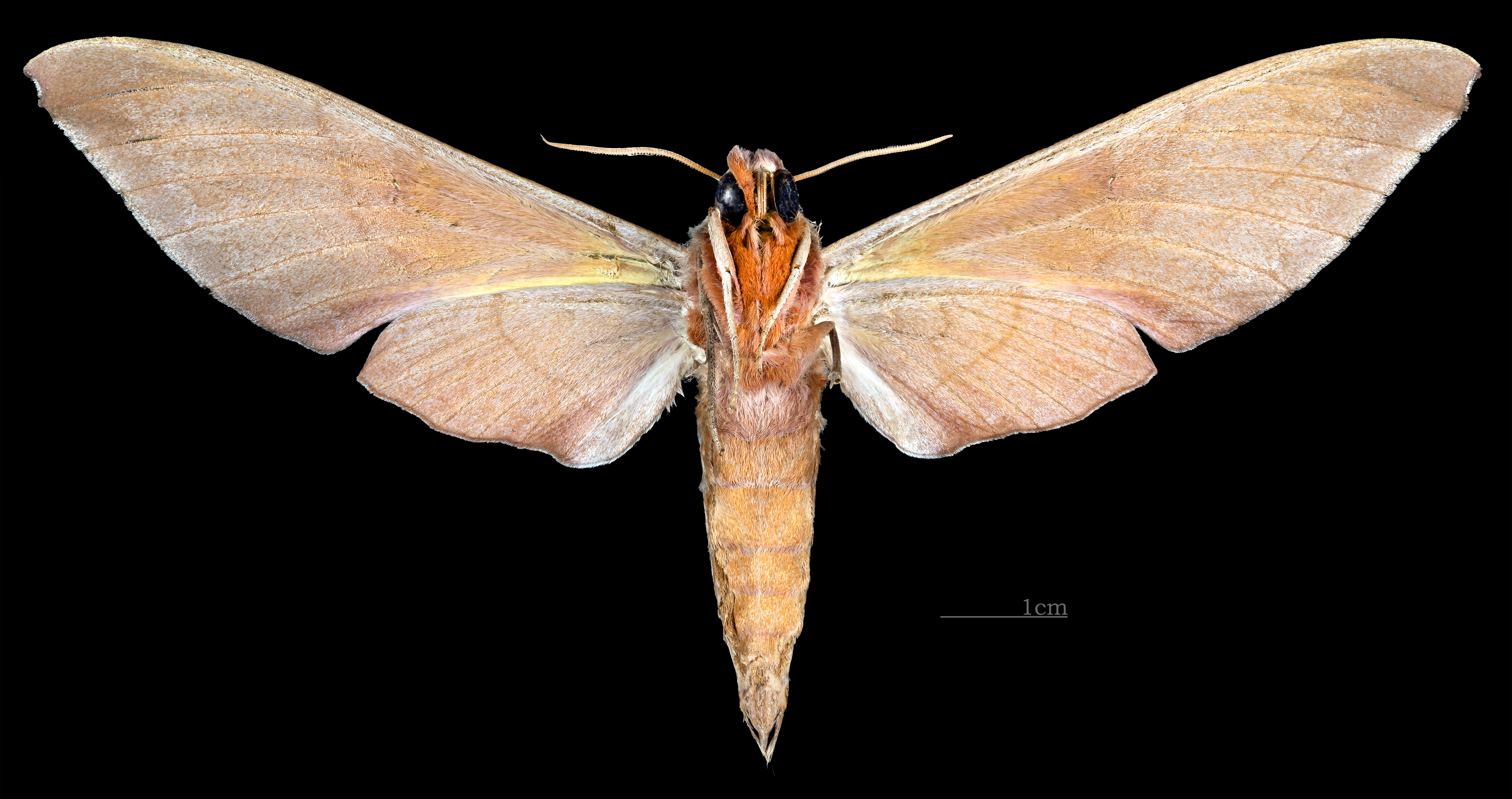
- Male ventral

Scientific classification
- Kingdom: Animalia
- Phylum: Arthropoda
- Class: Insecta
- Order: Lepidoptera
- Family: Sphingidae
- Genus: Protambulyx
- Species: P. carteri

Binomial name
- Protambulyx carteri Rothschild & Jordan, 1903

= Protambulyx carteri =

Carter's sphinx

Species of moth

Protambulyx carteri, or Carter's sphinx, is a species of moth of the family Sphingidae. It is known from the US state of Florida.
