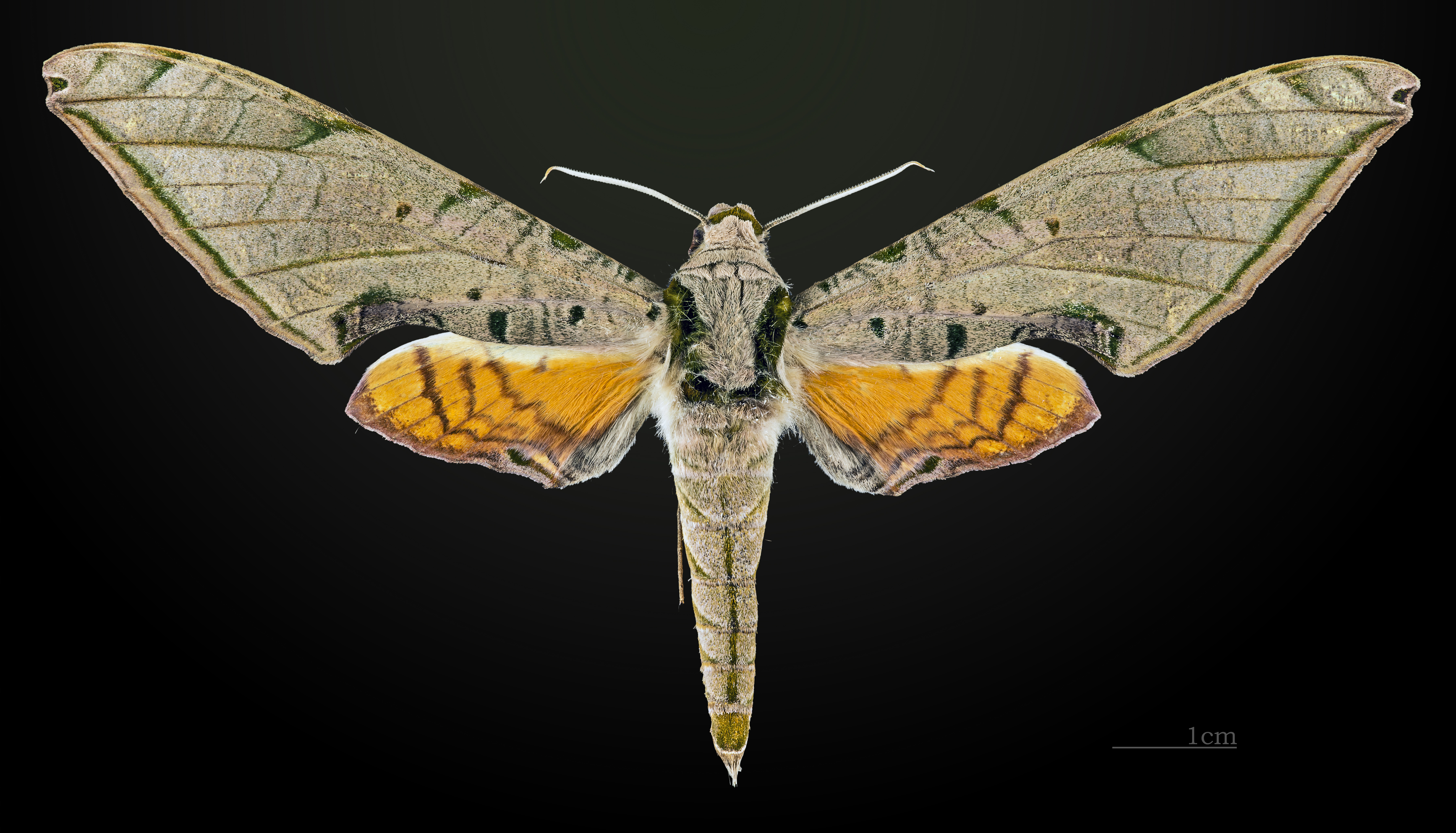
- Protambulyx strigilis

Scientific classification
- Domain: Eukaryota
- Kingdom: Animalia
- Phylum: Arthropoda
- Class: Insecta
- Order: Lepidoptera
- Family: Sphingidae
- Tribe: Ambulycini
- Genus: Protambulyx; Rothschild & Jordan, 1903

Synonyms
- Ambulyx Burmeister, 1855; Ambulyx Herrich-Schäffer, 1854; Ambulyx Lucas, 1857; Ambulyx Walker, 1856

= Protambulyx =

Genus of moths

Protambulyx is a genus of moths in the family Sphingidae first described by Walter Rothschild and Karl Jordan in 1903.

== Species ==
- Protambulyx astygonus (Boisduval 1875)
- Protambulyx carteri Rothschild & Jordan 1903
- Protambulyx euryalus Rothschild & Jordan 1903
- Protambulyx eurycles (Herrich-Schaffer 1854)
- Protambulyx goeldii Rothschild & Jordan 1903
- Protambulyx ockendeni Rothschild & Jordan 1903
- Protambulyx strigilis (Linnaeus 1771)
- Protambulyx sulphurea Rothschild & Jordan 1903

== Gallery ==
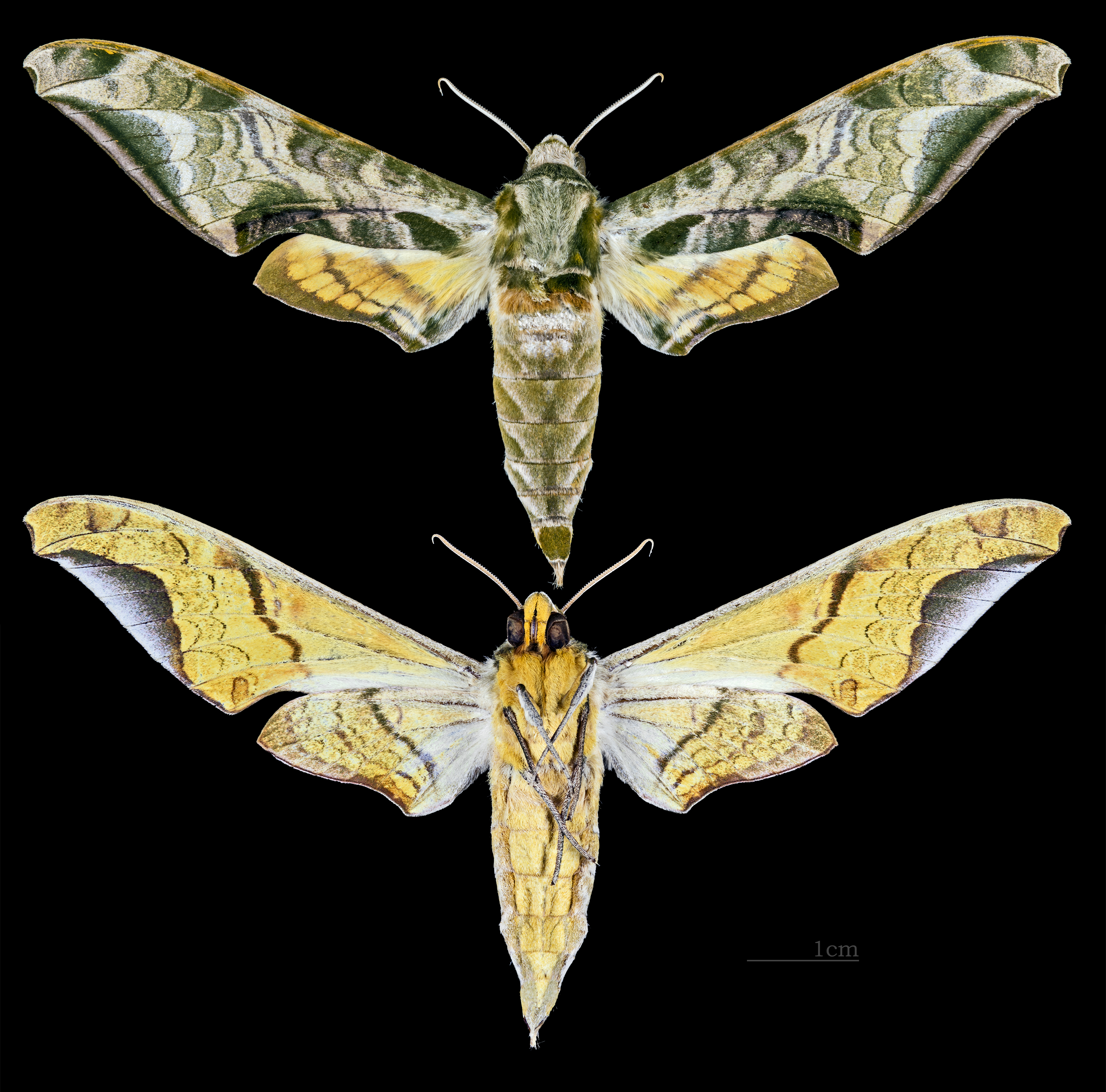
Protambulyx astygonus

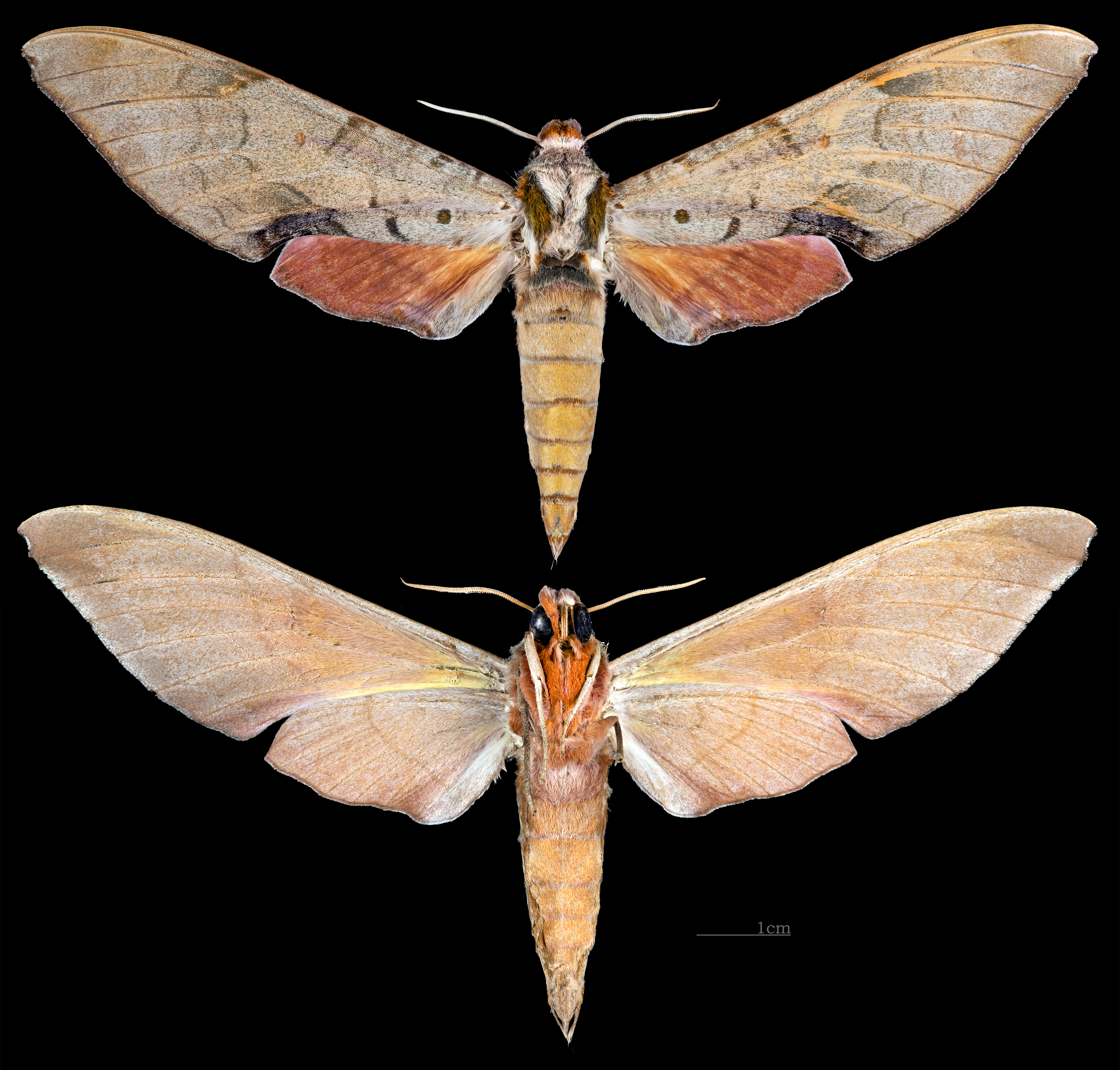
Protambulyx carteri

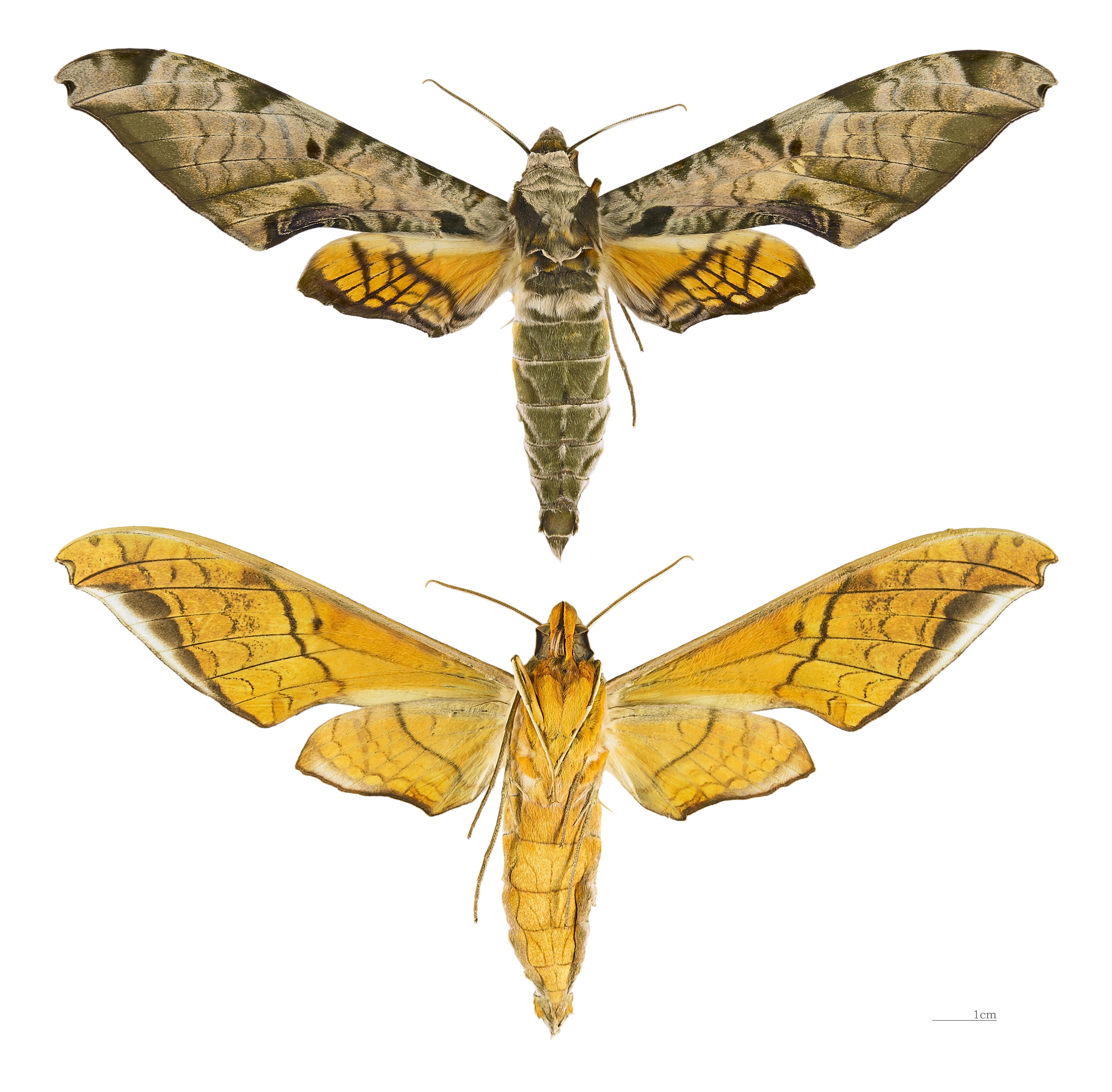
Protambulyx eurycles

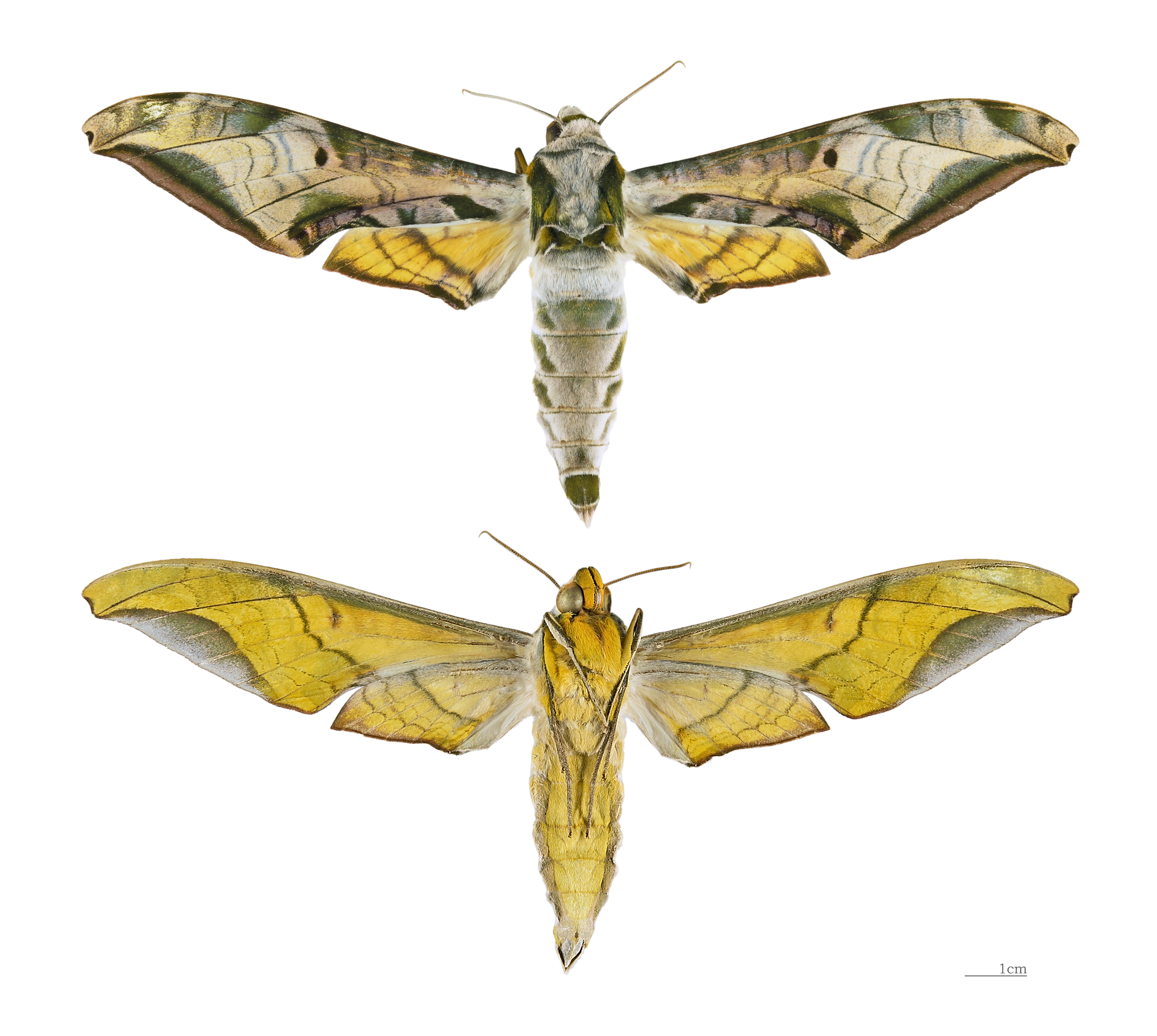
Protambulyx goeldii

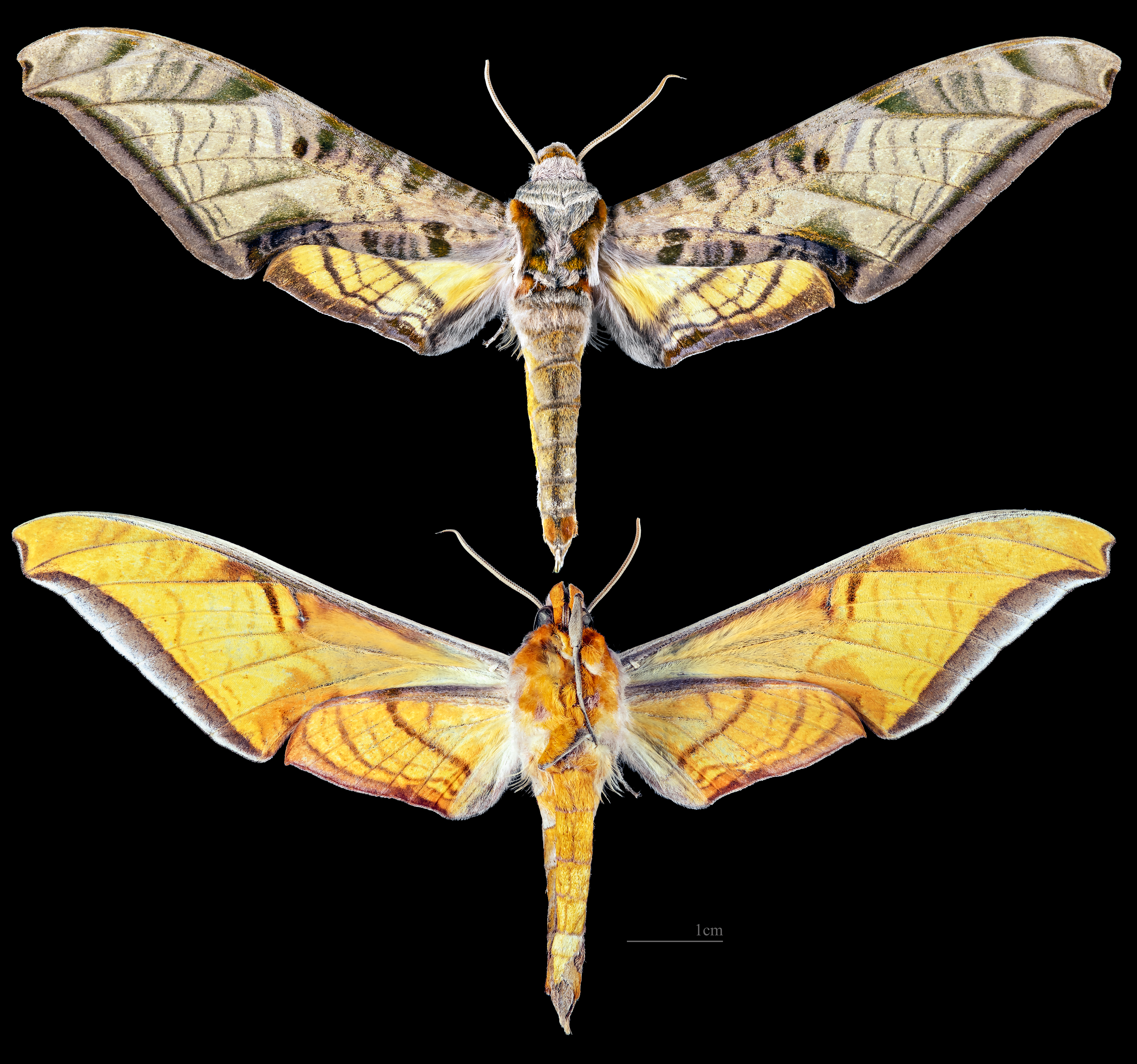
Protambulyx ockendeni

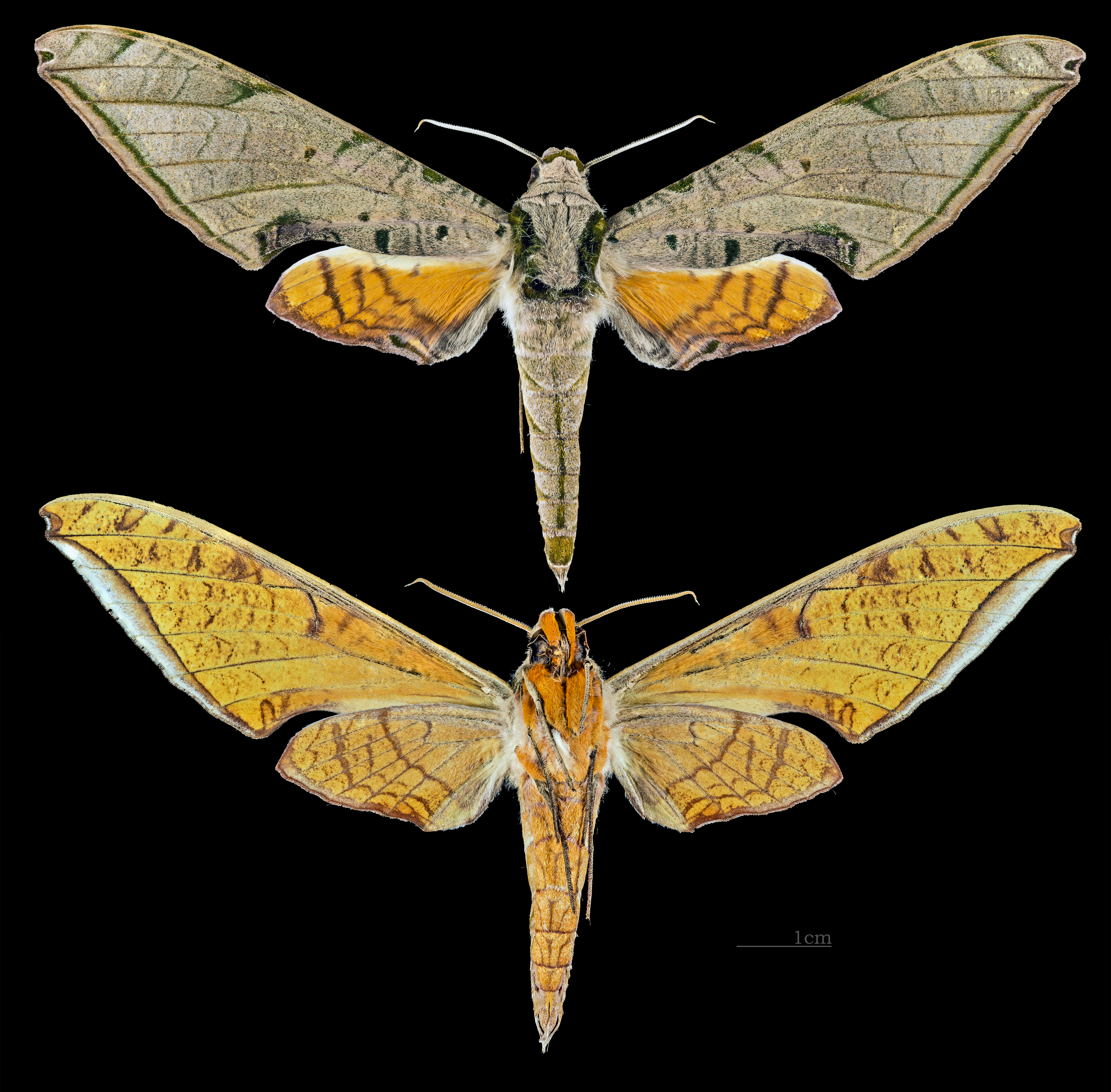
Protambulyx strigilis

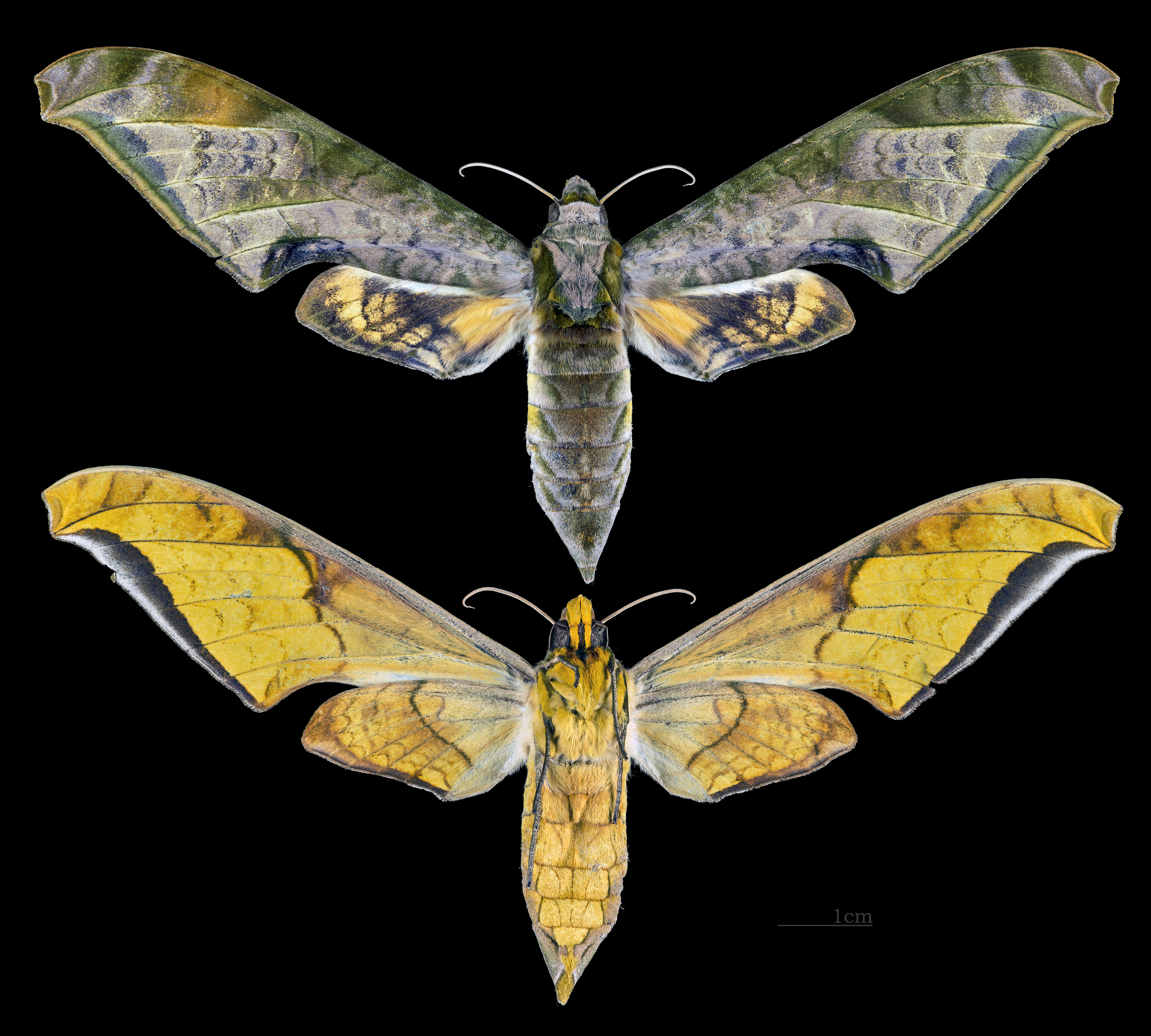
Protambulyx sulphurea
