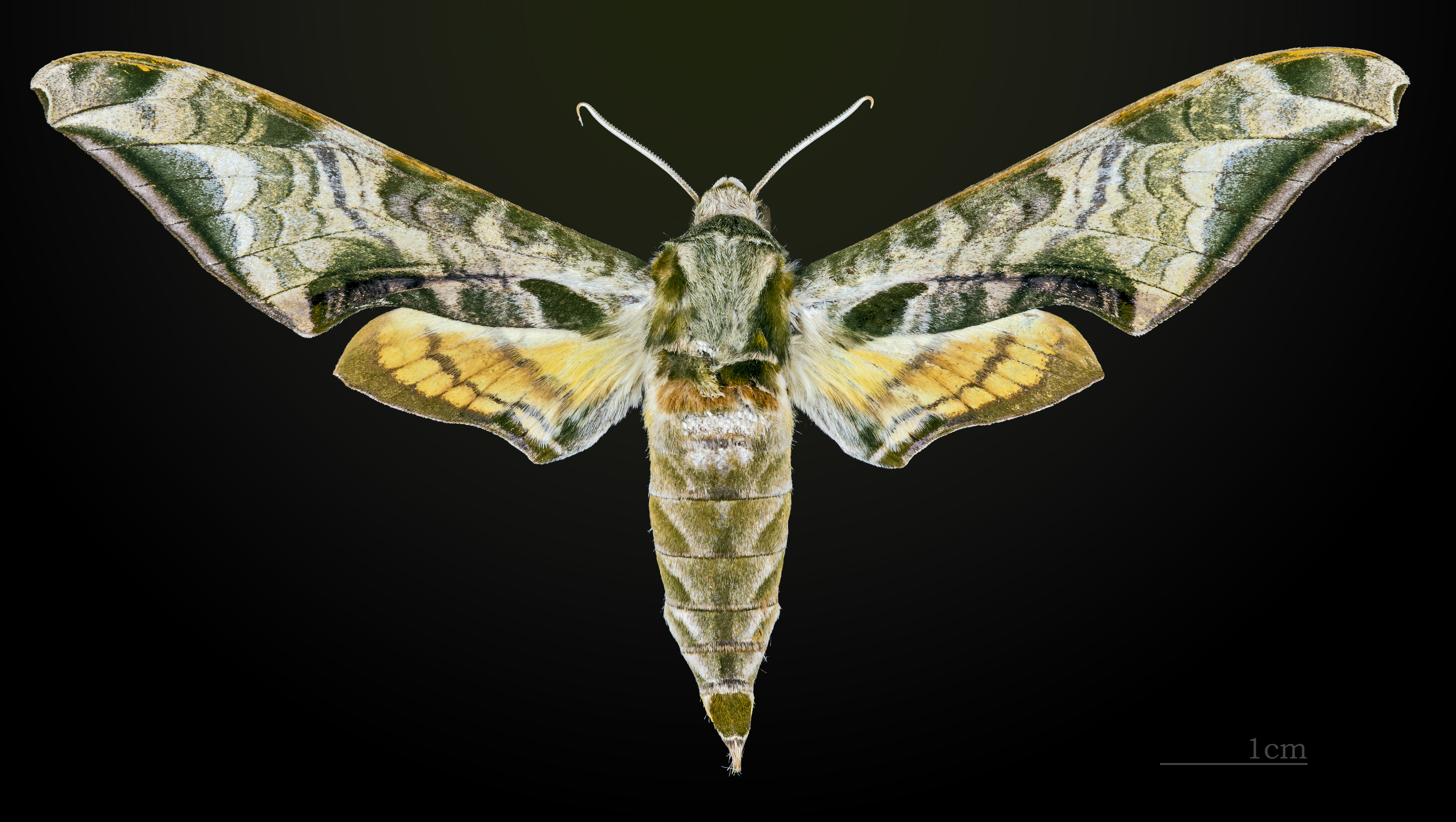
- Male - dorsal view

Scientific classification
- Kingdom: Animalia
- Phylum: Arthropoda
- Class: Insecta
- Order: Lepidoptera
- Family: Sphingidae
- Genus: Protambulyx
- Species: P. astygonus

Binomial name
- Protambulyx astygonus (Boisduval, 1875)

Synonyms
- Ambulyx astygonus Boisduval, 1875

= Protambulyx astygonus =

Species of moth

Protambulyx astygonus is a species of moth of the family Sphingidae first described by Jean Baptiste Boisduval in 1875. It is known from Bolivia, Paraguay and Brazil.

== Description ==
The wingspan is about 100 mm. It is similar to Protambulyx goeldii, but the forewing is lacking the large discal spot and the submarginal line of the hindwing is crenulated and angled outwards on the veins.

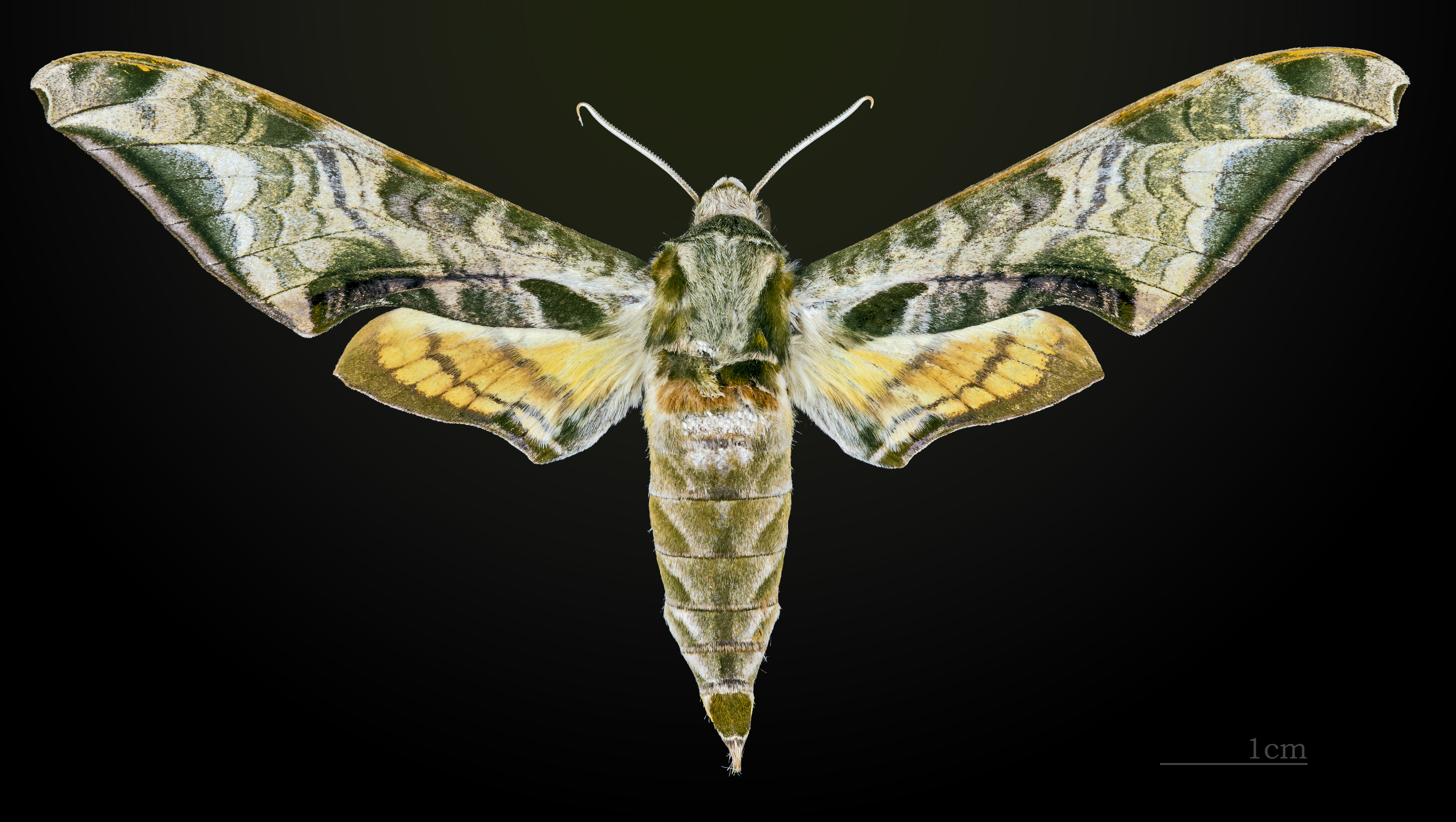
Male

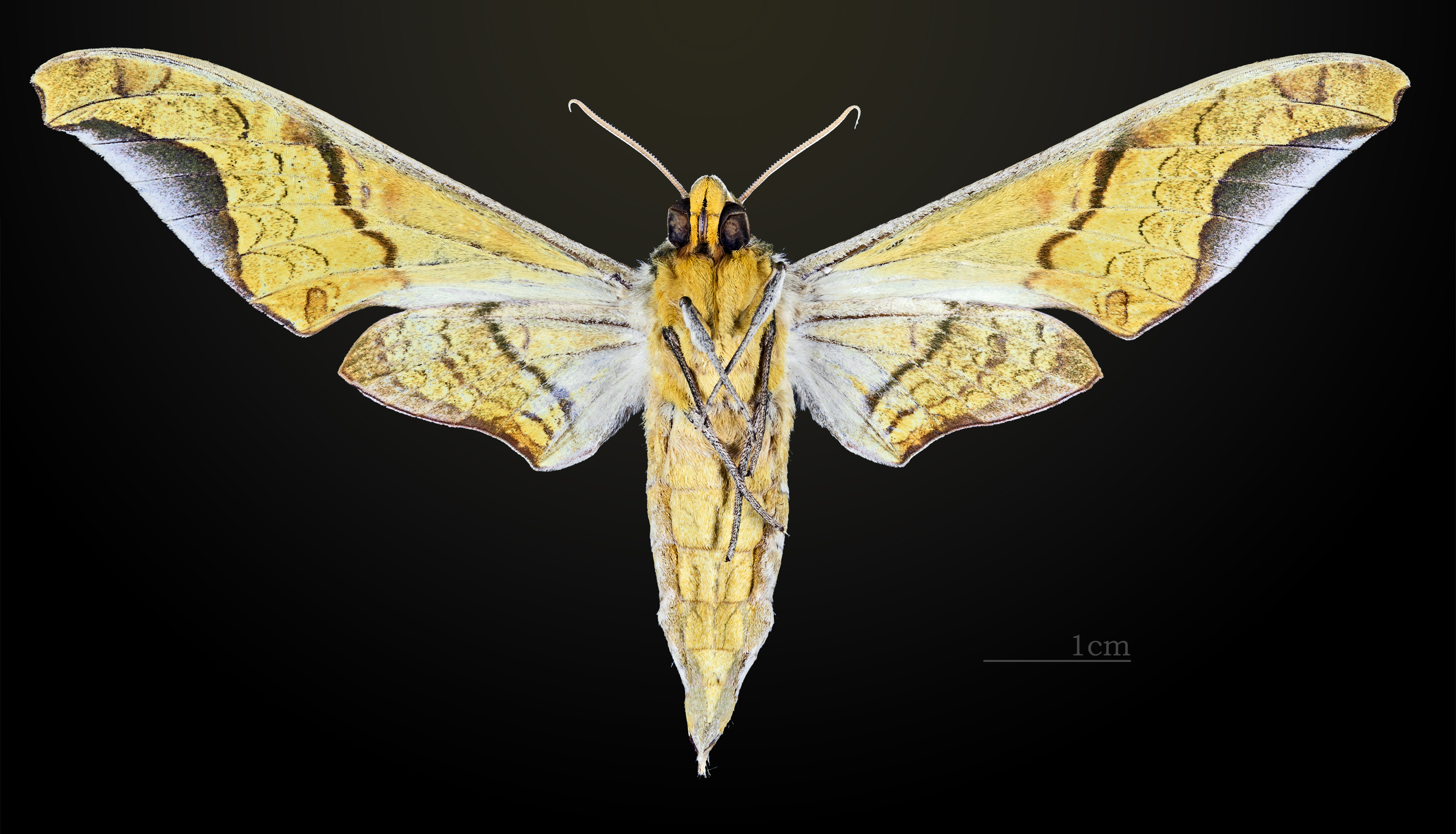
Male underside

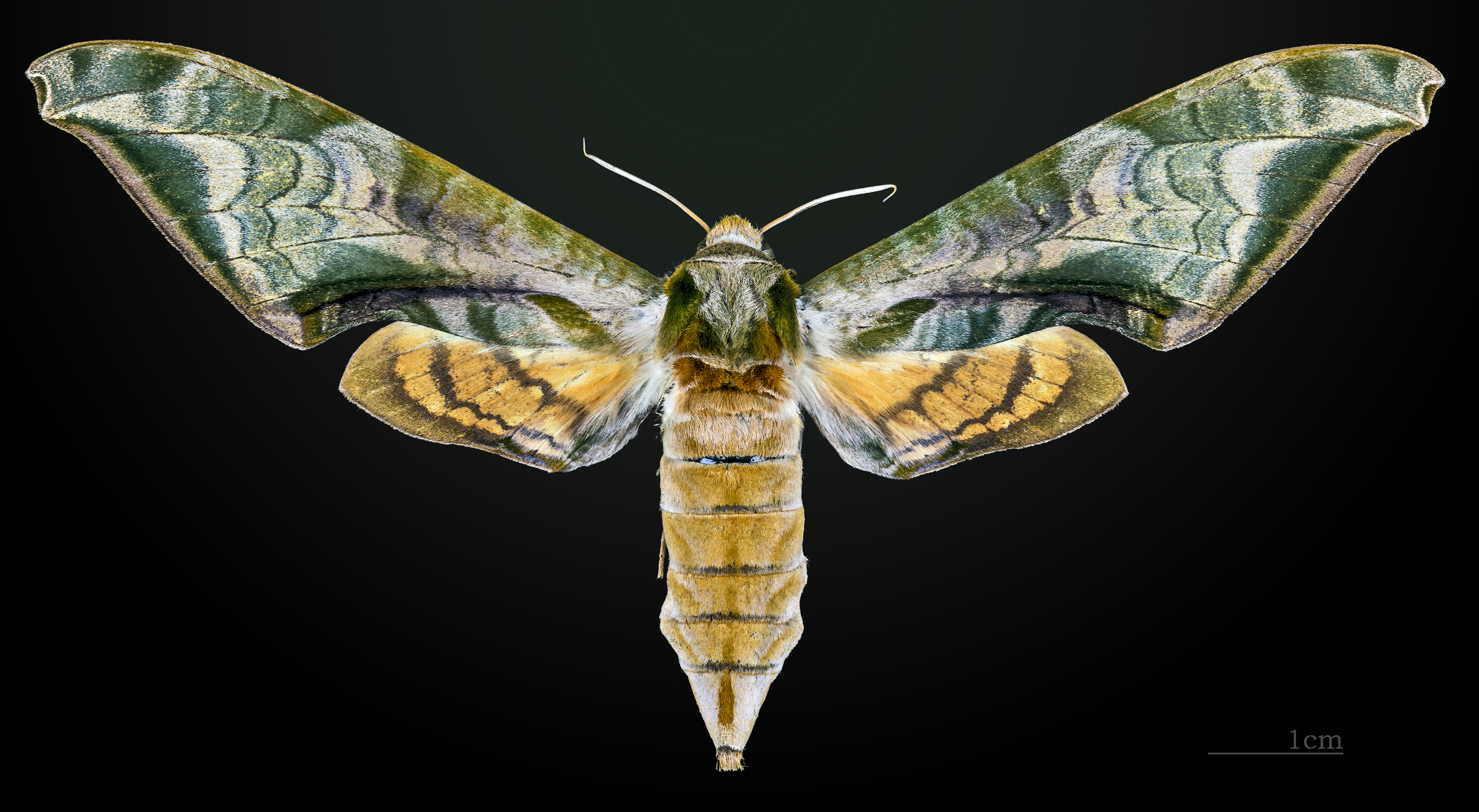
Female

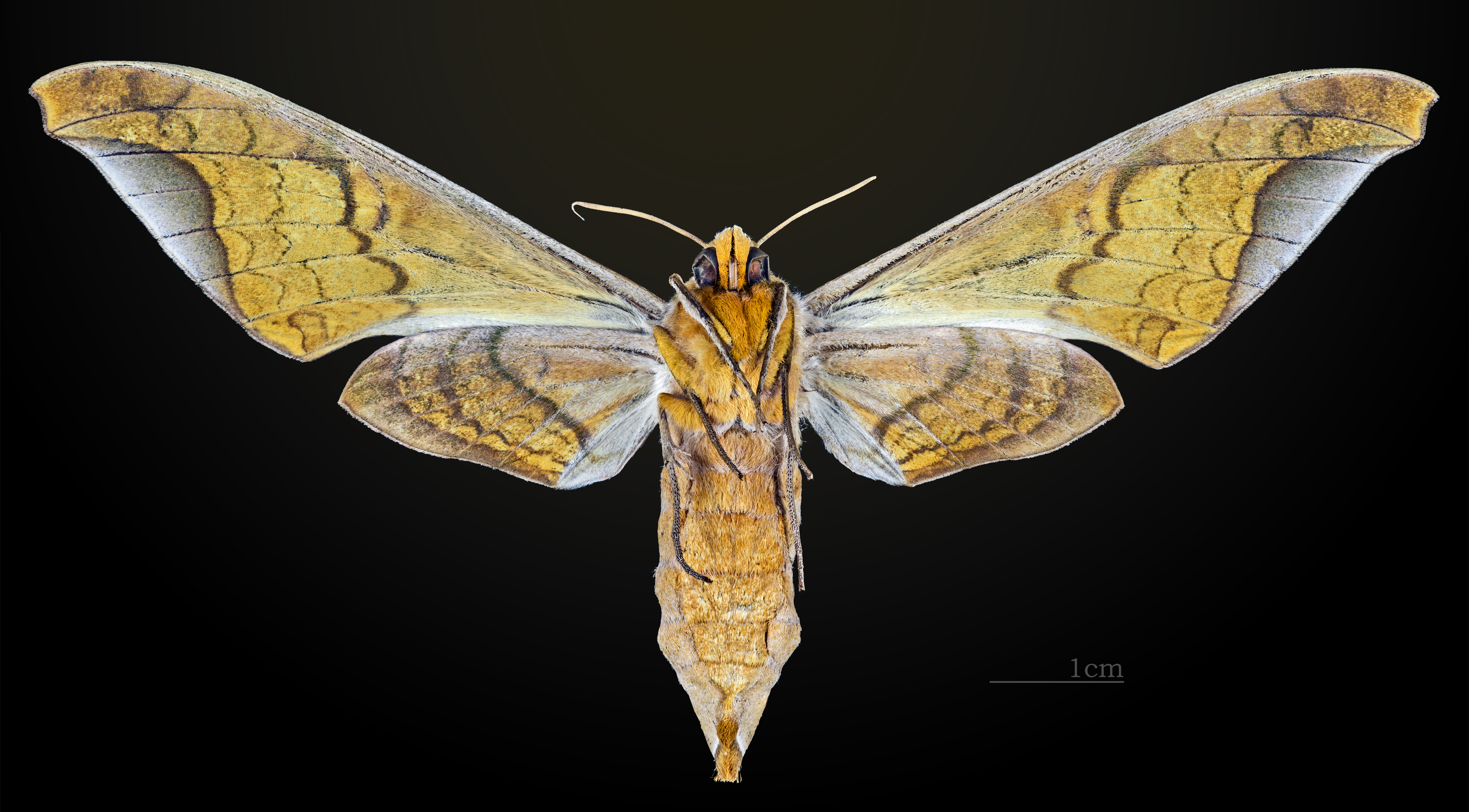
Female underside

== Biology ==
Adults are on wing in October in Bolivia. In Paraguay, adults have been recorded in June. There are probably at least two generations per year.
