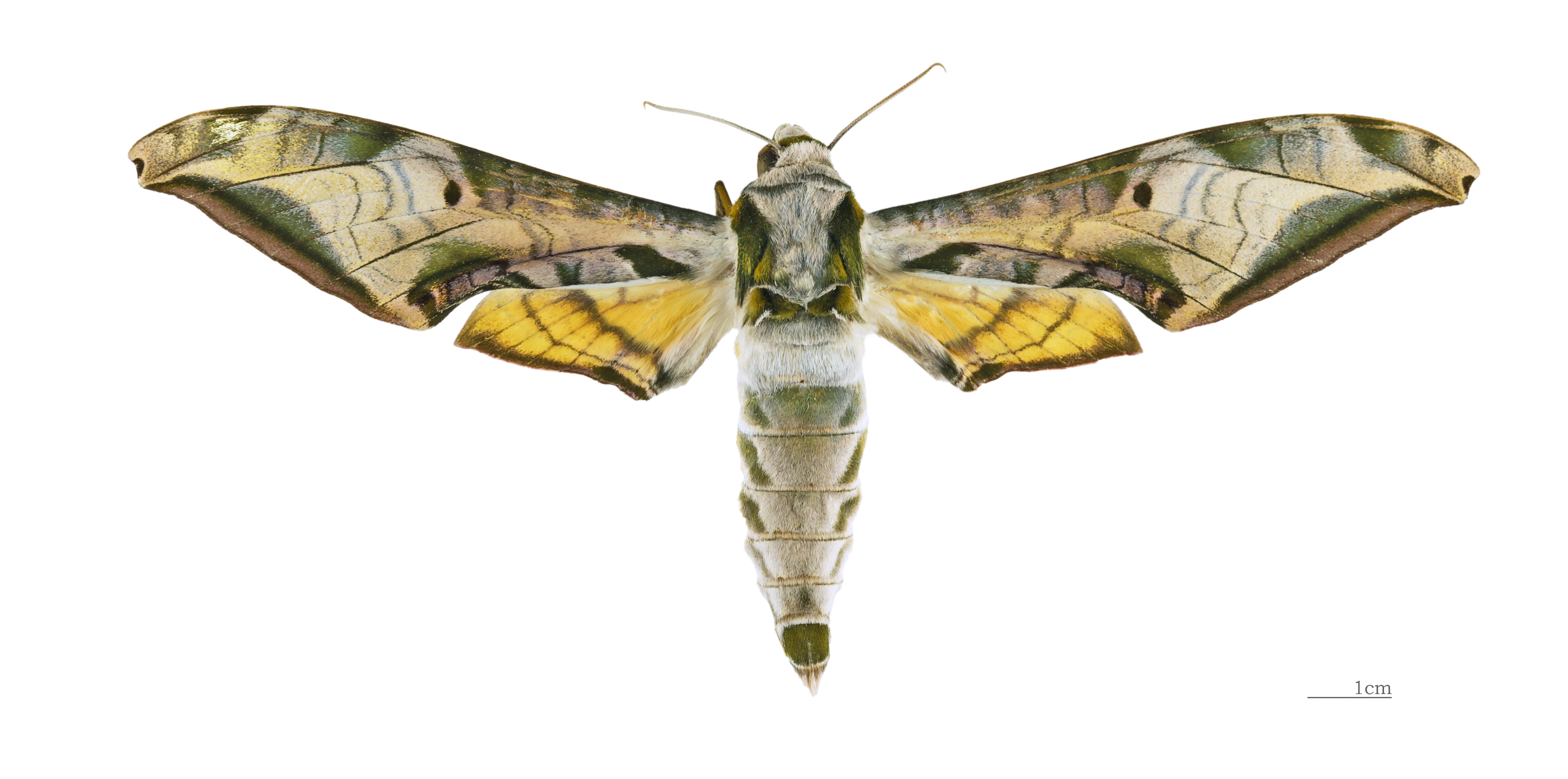
- Upperside
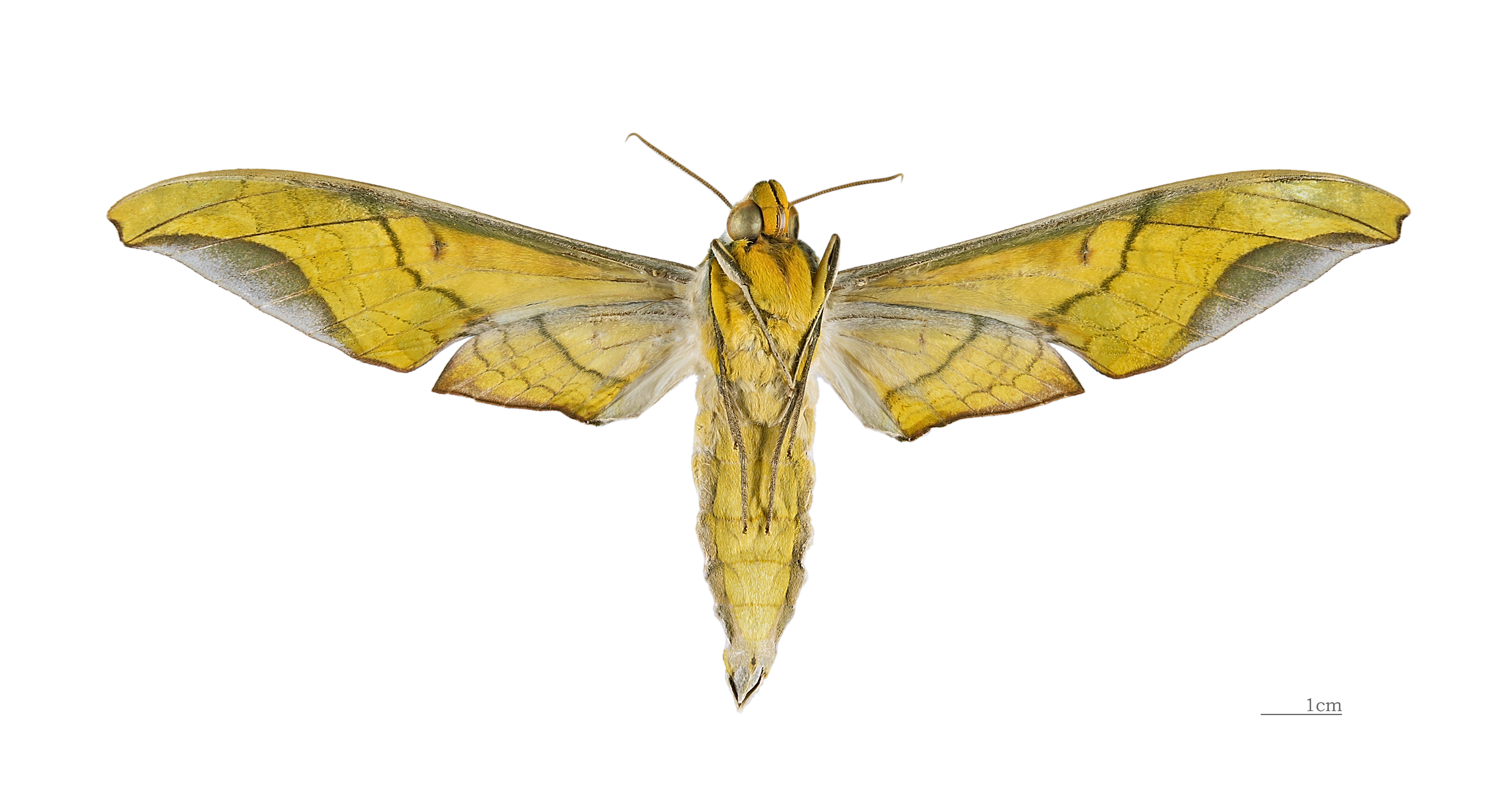
- Underside

Scientific classification
- Kingdom: Animalia
- Phylum: Arthropoda
- Class: Insecta
- Order: Lepidoptera
- Family: Sphingidae
- Genus: Protambulyx
- Species: P. goeldii

Binomial name
- Protambulyx goeldii Rothschild & Jordan, 1903

Synonyms
- Ambulyx marcata Schaus, 1912; Protambulyx goeldii andicus Gehlen, 1928

= Protambulyx goeldii =

Species of moth

Protambulyx goeldii is a species of moth of the family Sphingidae first described by Walter Rothschild and Karl Jordan in 1903. It is found in Brazil, Colombia, Guyana, Bolivia, southern Nicaragua, Costa Rica and probably Panama.

It is similar to Protambulyx astygonus but there is a distinct discal spot on the forewing upperside. Furthermore, there are differences in the pattern on the hindwing upperside, the distal edge is straighter, the antemedian line is less curved, the median line is absent and the submarginal line is less dentate.

Adults are probably on wing year round. In Bolivia, adults have been recorded in April and October.
