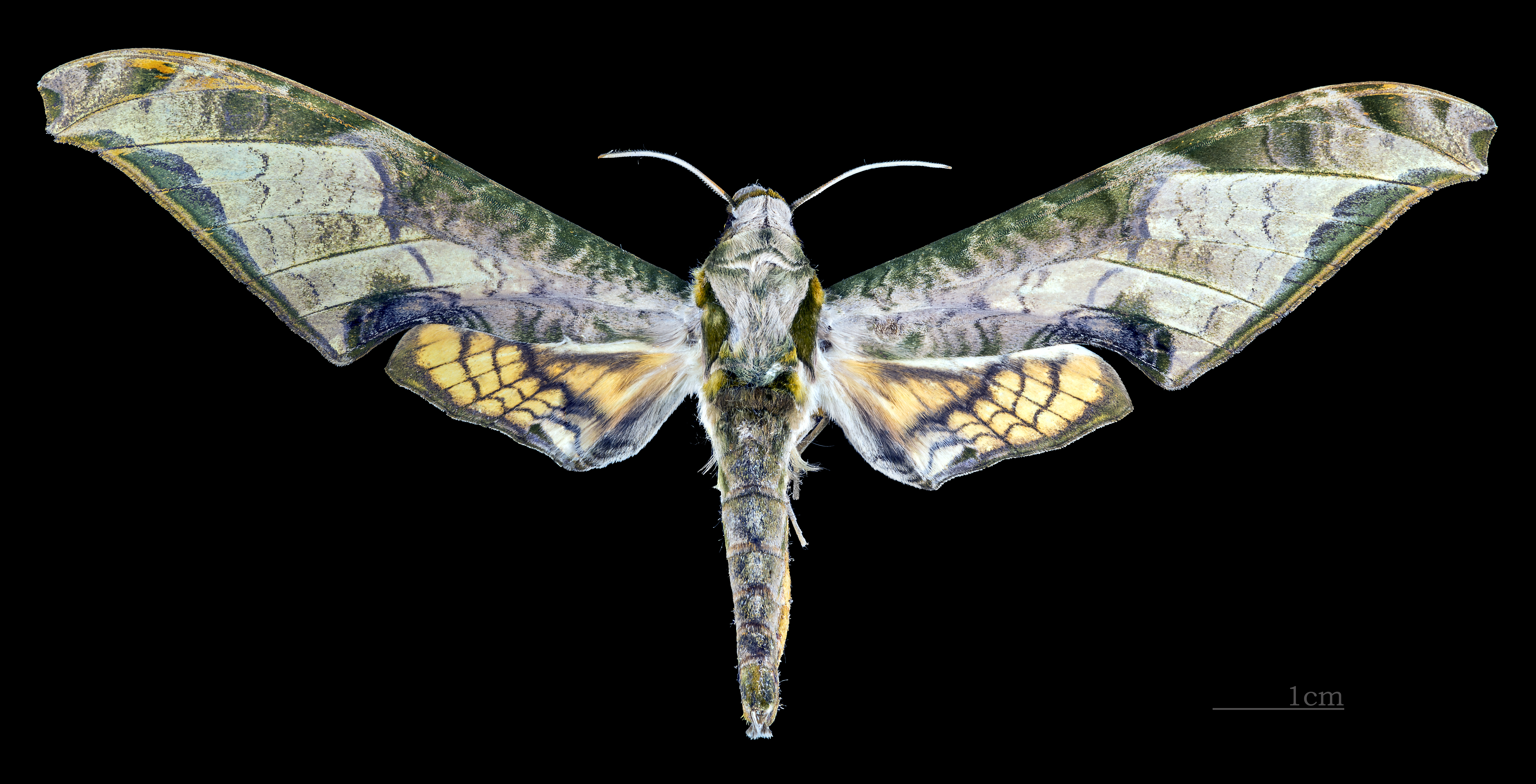
- Protambulyx sulphurea male dorsal
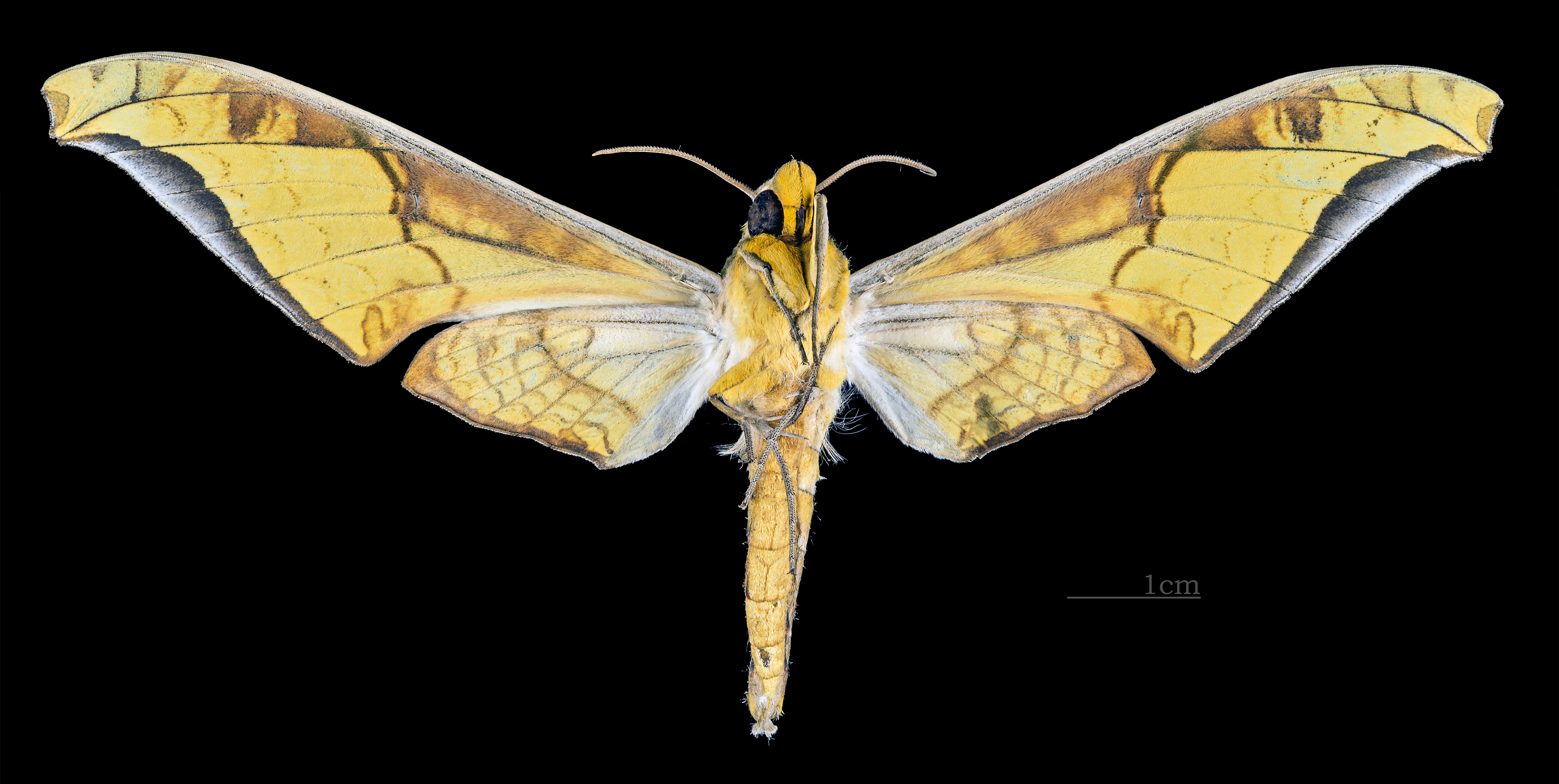
- Protambulyx sulphurea male ventral

Scientific classification
- Kingdom: Animalia
- Phylum: Arthropoda
- Class: Insecta
- Order: Lepidoptera
- Family: Sphingidae
- Genus: Protambulyx
- Species: P. sulphurea

Binomial name
- Protambulyx sulphurea Rothschild & Jordan, 1903

= Protambulyx sulphurea =

Species of moth

Protambulyx sulphurea is a species of moth of the family Sphingidae.

== Distribution ==
It is known from northern and south-western Venezuela and Bolivia.

== Description ==
The wingspan is about 110 mm.

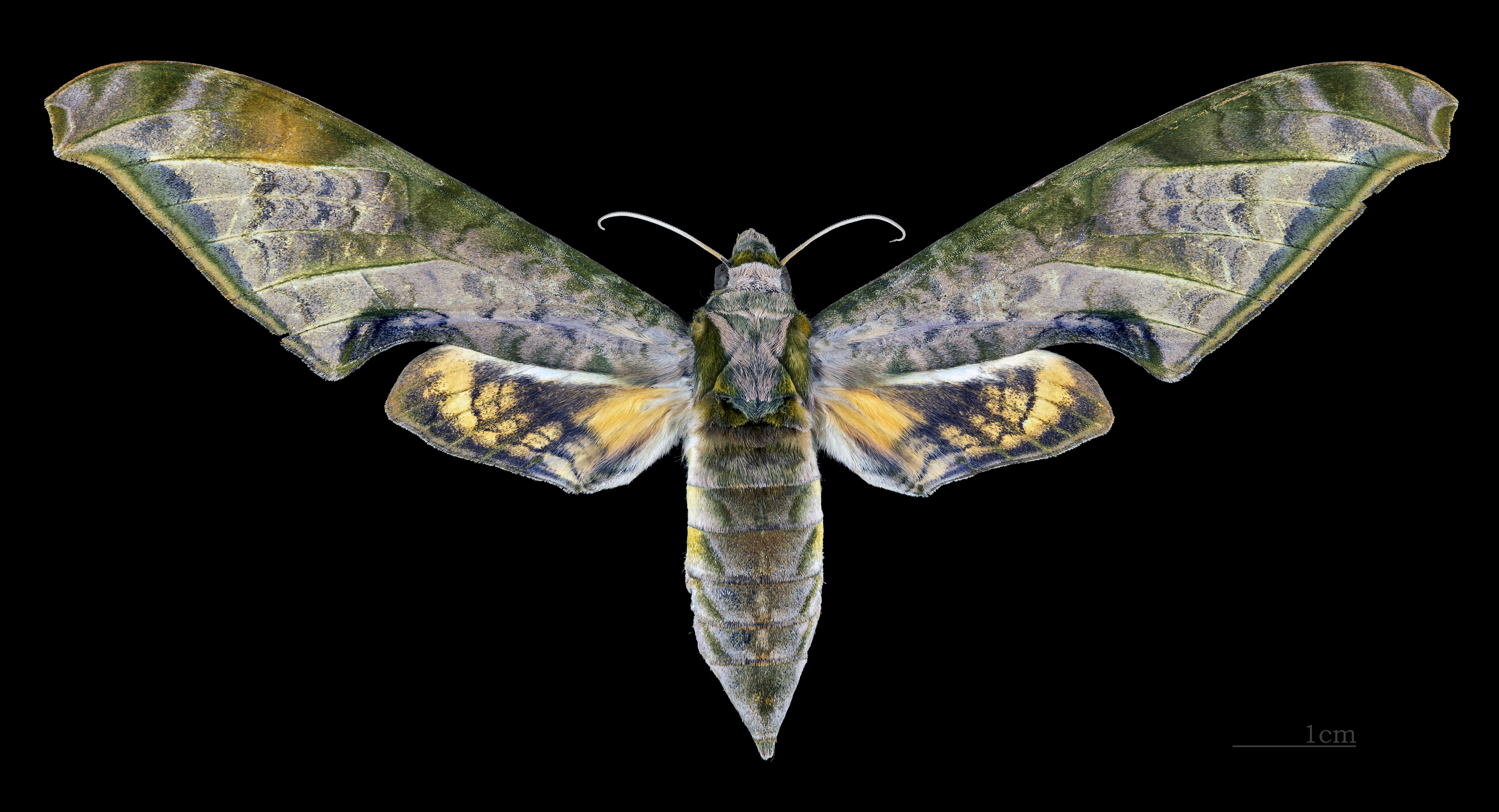
Female Dorsal

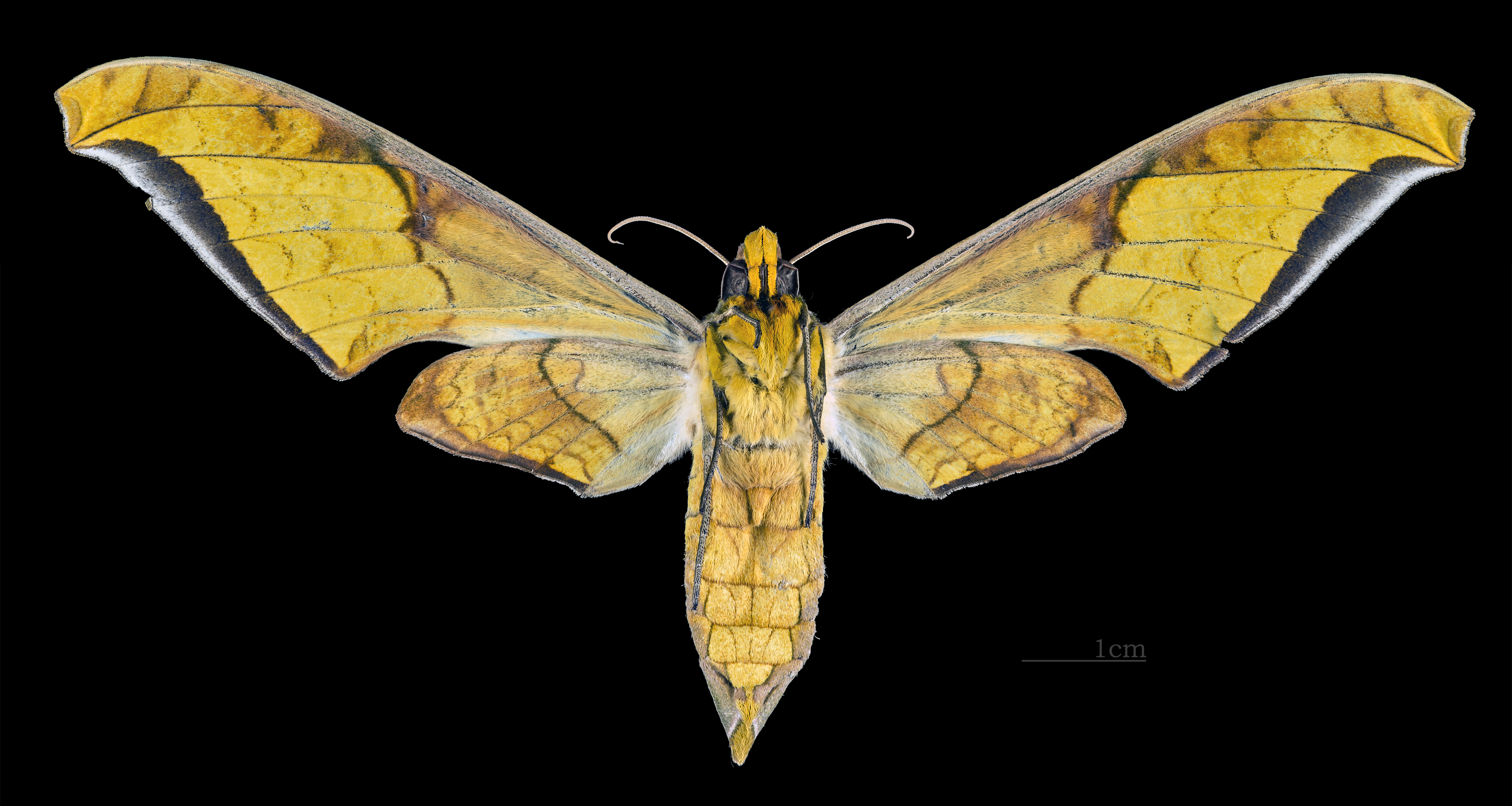
Female Ventral

== Biology ==
Adults are probably on wing year round.
