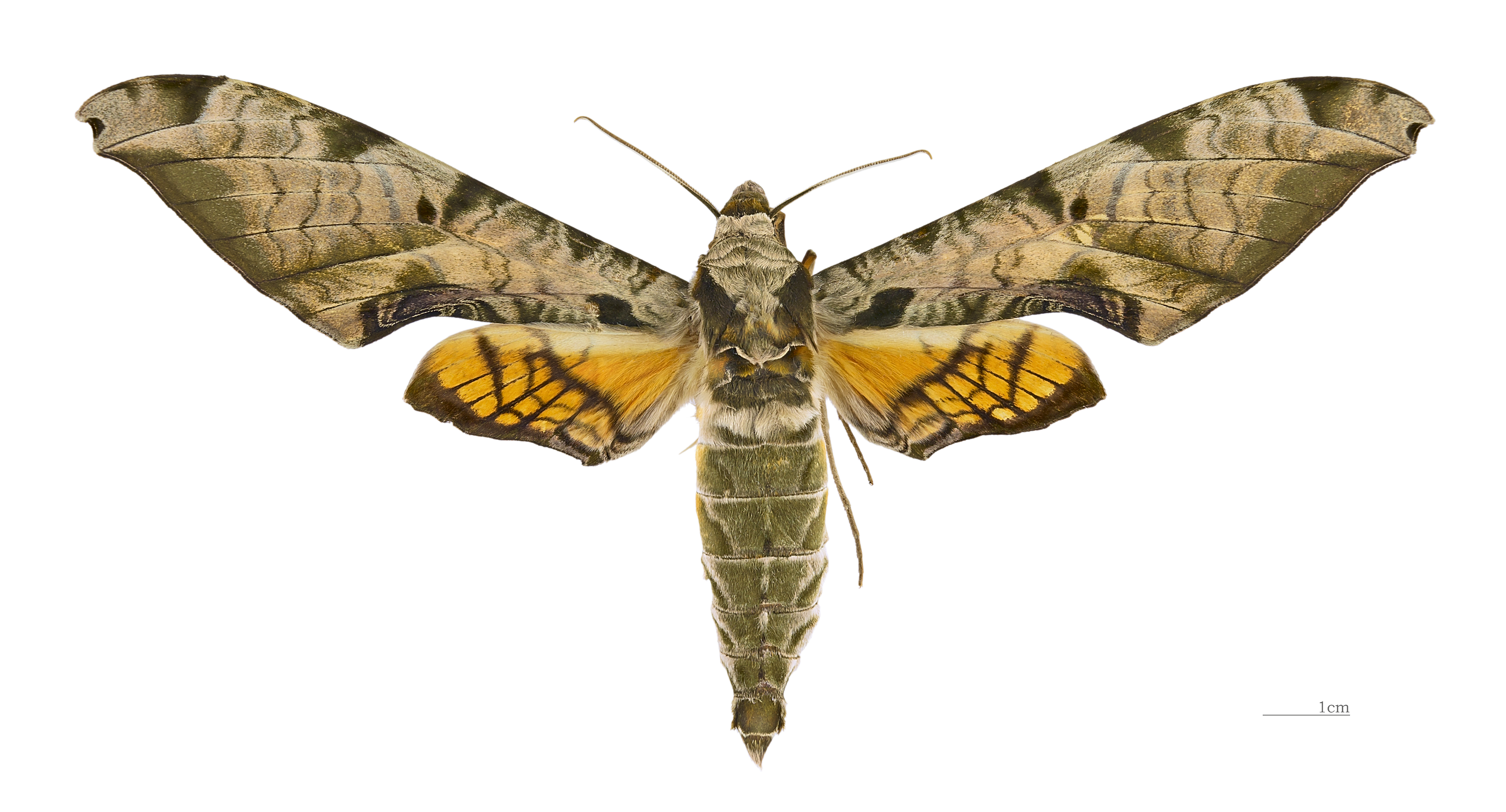
- Male dorsal
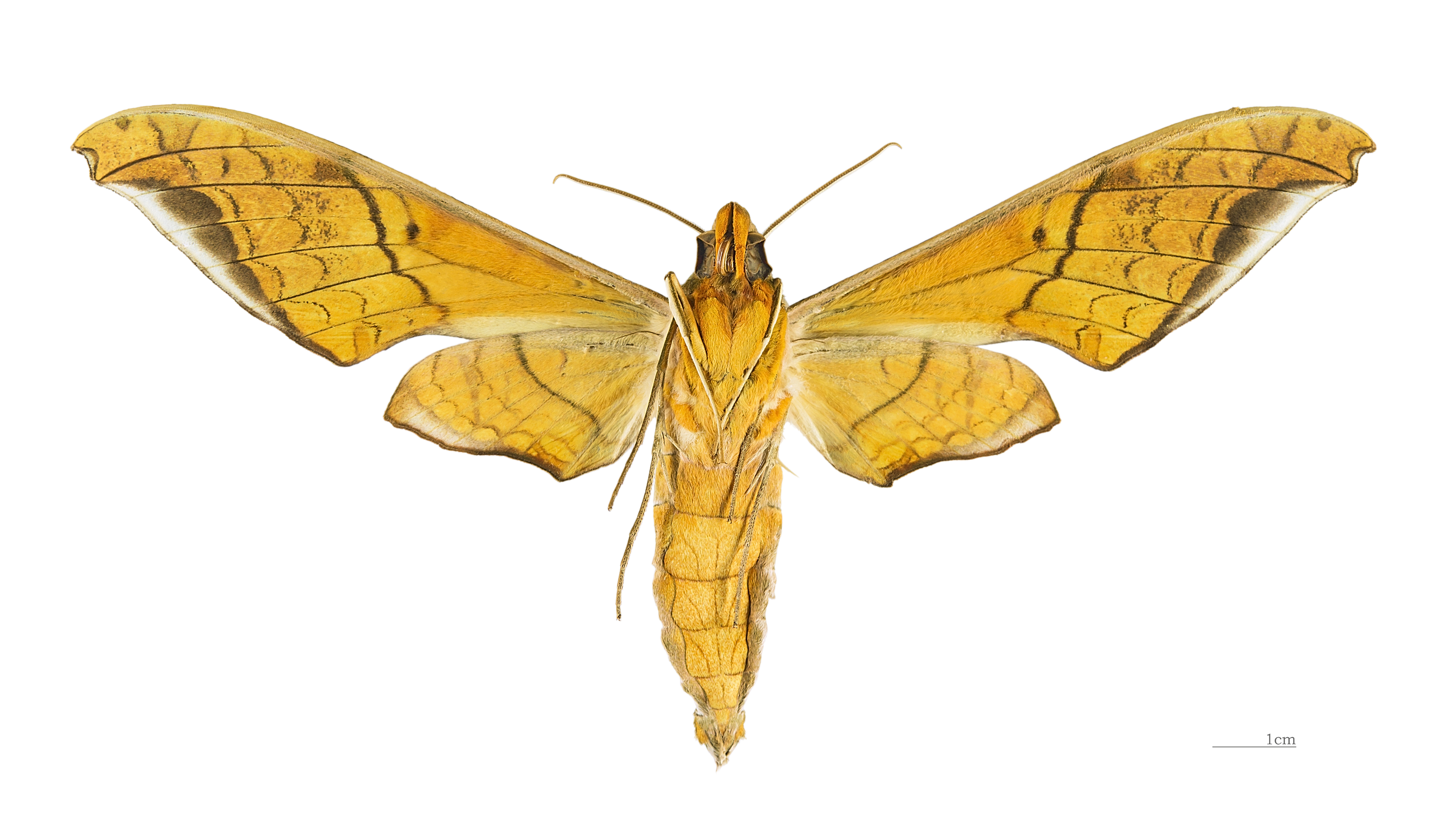
- Male ventral

Scientific classification
- Kingdom: Animalia
- Phylum: Arthropoda
- Class: Insecta
- Order: Lepidoptera
- Family: Sphingidae
- Genus: Protambulyx
- Species: P. eurycles

Binomial name
- Protambulyx eurycles (Herrich-Schäffer, 1854)

Synonyms
- Ambulyx eurycles Herrich-Schäffer, 1854; Protambulyx fasciatus Gehlen, 1928; Protambulyx rydbergi Gehlen, 1933; Protambulyx xanthus Rothschild & Jordan, 1906; Protambulyx xanthus australis Clark, 1937

= Protambulyx eurycles =

Species of moth

Protambulyx eurycles is a species of moth of the family Sphingidae first described by Gottlieb August Wilhelm Herrich-Schäffer in 1854.

== Distribution ==
It is known from Suriname, Guyana, French Guiana, Colombia, Ecuador, Peru, Bolivia, Brazil, Costa Rica, Nicaragua and Mexico.

== Description ==
It is similar to Protambulyx euryalus but the forewing marginal band is much broader and the proximal edge is crenulated. Females are less heavily marked than males.

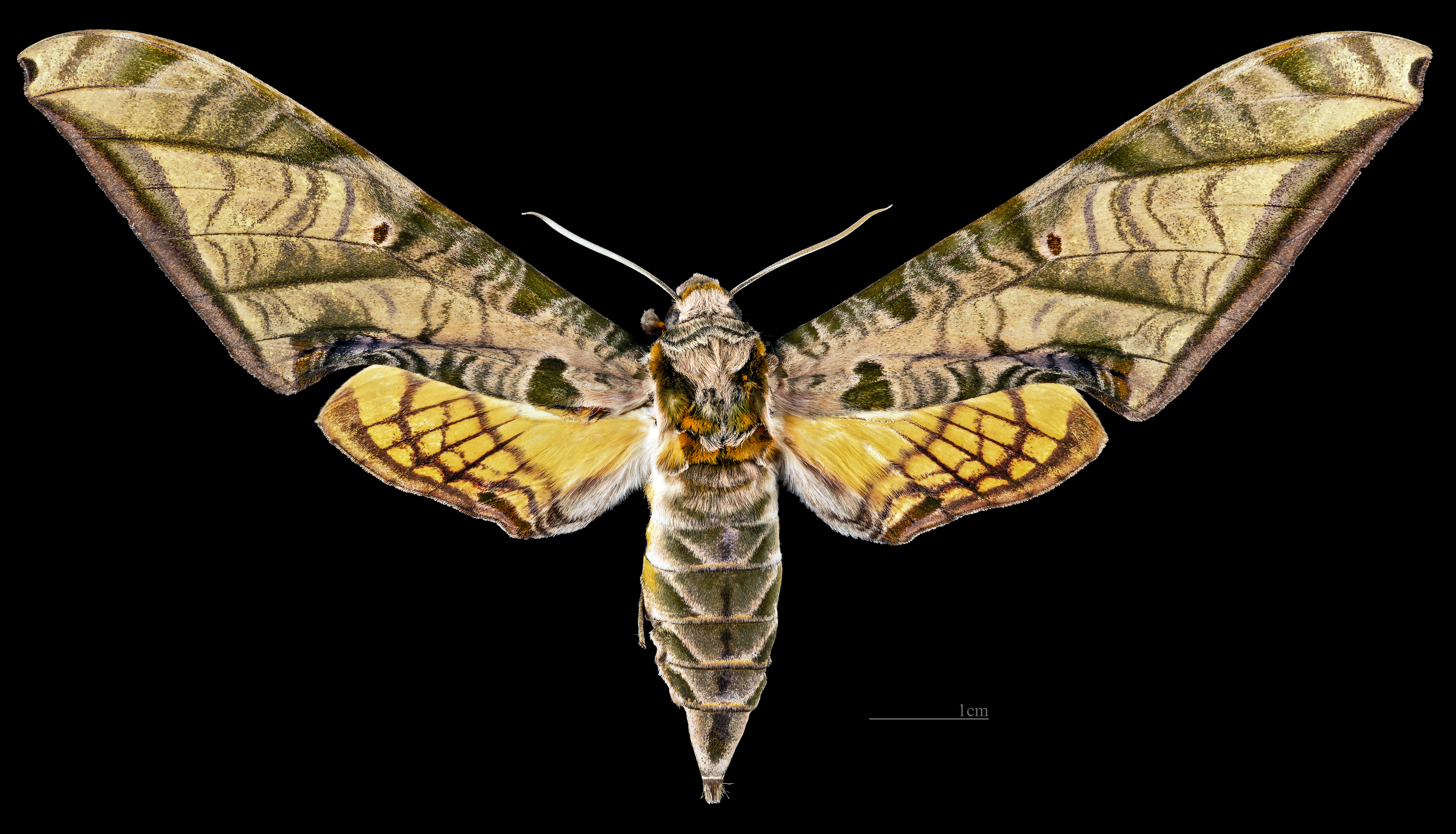
Female dorsal

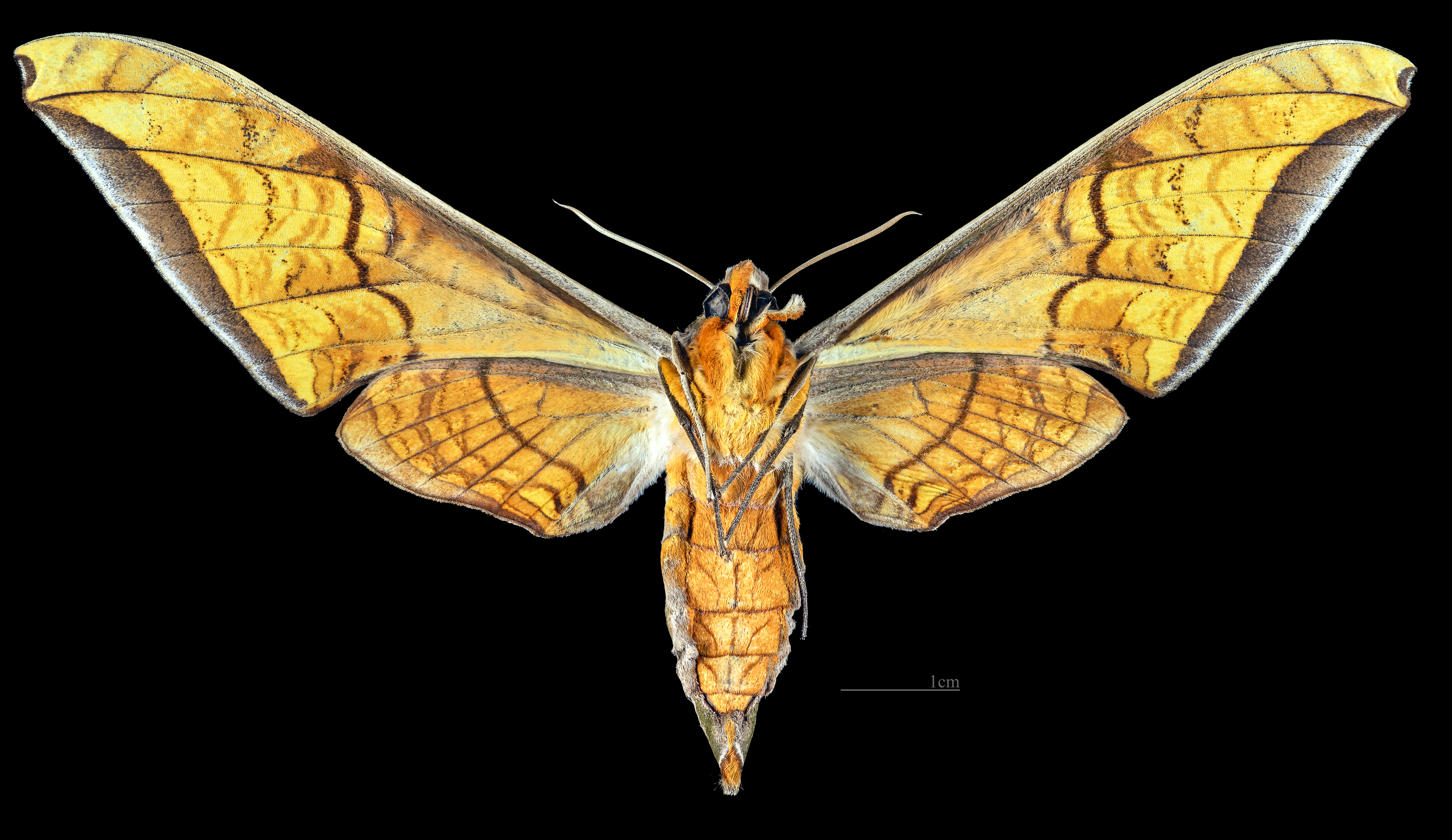
Female ventral
