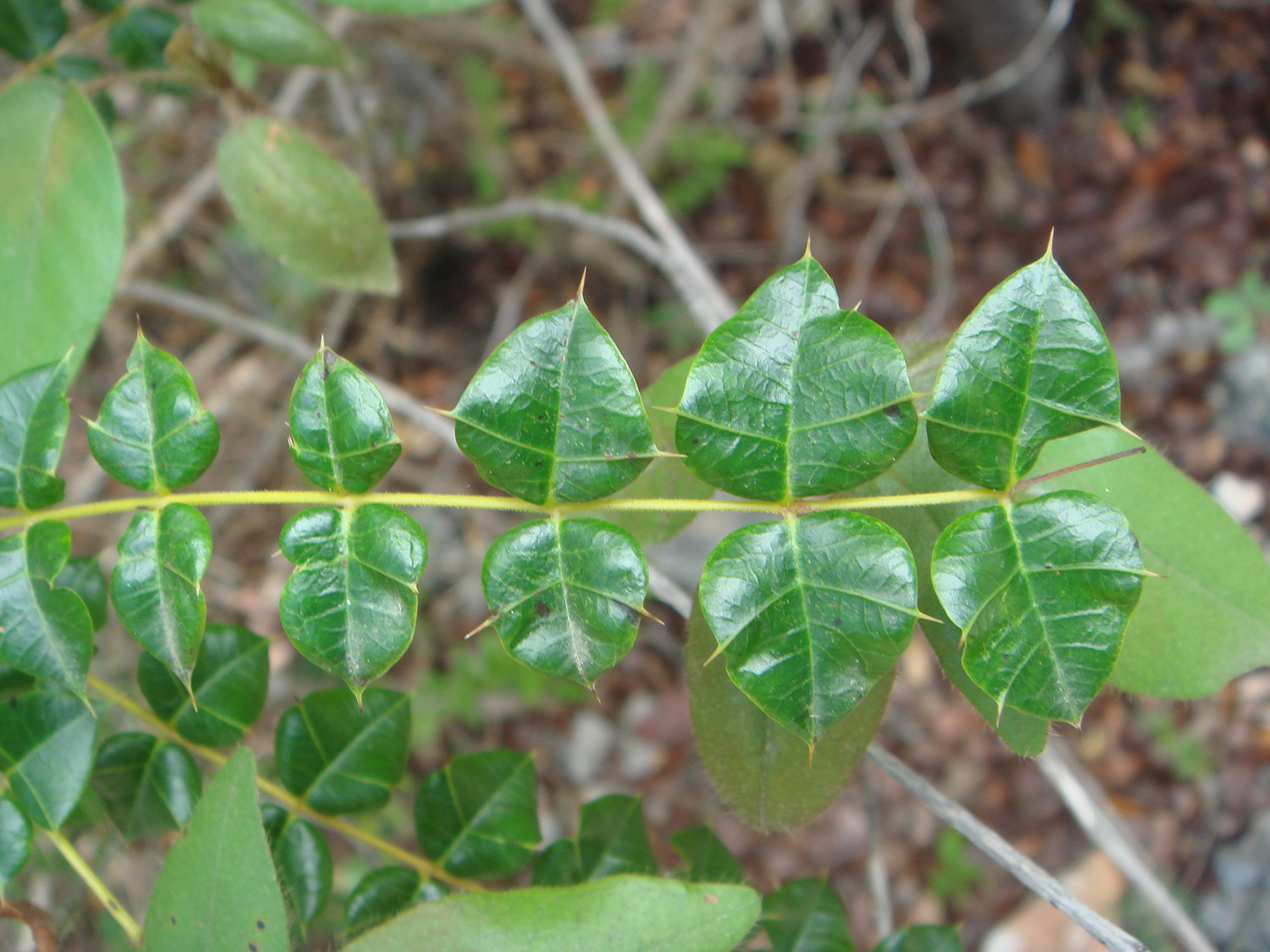

Conservation status
- Least Concern (IUCN 3.1)

Scientific classification
- Kingdom: Plantae
- Clade: Tracheophytes
- Clade: Angiosperms
- Clade: Eudicots
- Clade: Rosids
- Order: Sapindales
- Family: Anacardiaceae
- Genus: Comocladia
- Species: C. dodonaea

Binomial name
- Comocladia dodonaea (L.) Britton

Synonyms
- Comocladia angulosa Willd.; Comocladia ilicifolia Sw.; Comocladia tricuspidata Lam.; Dodonaea tricuspidata Pritz.; Ilex dodonaea L.

= Comocladia dodonaea =

Species of plant

Comocladia dodonaea, with common names poison ash, and Christmas bush, is a species of tree in the cashew family, Anacardiaceae. It is native to Caribbean islands.

In the sap of the plant and on the surface of the leaves is an urushiol poison similar to that in poison ivy.
