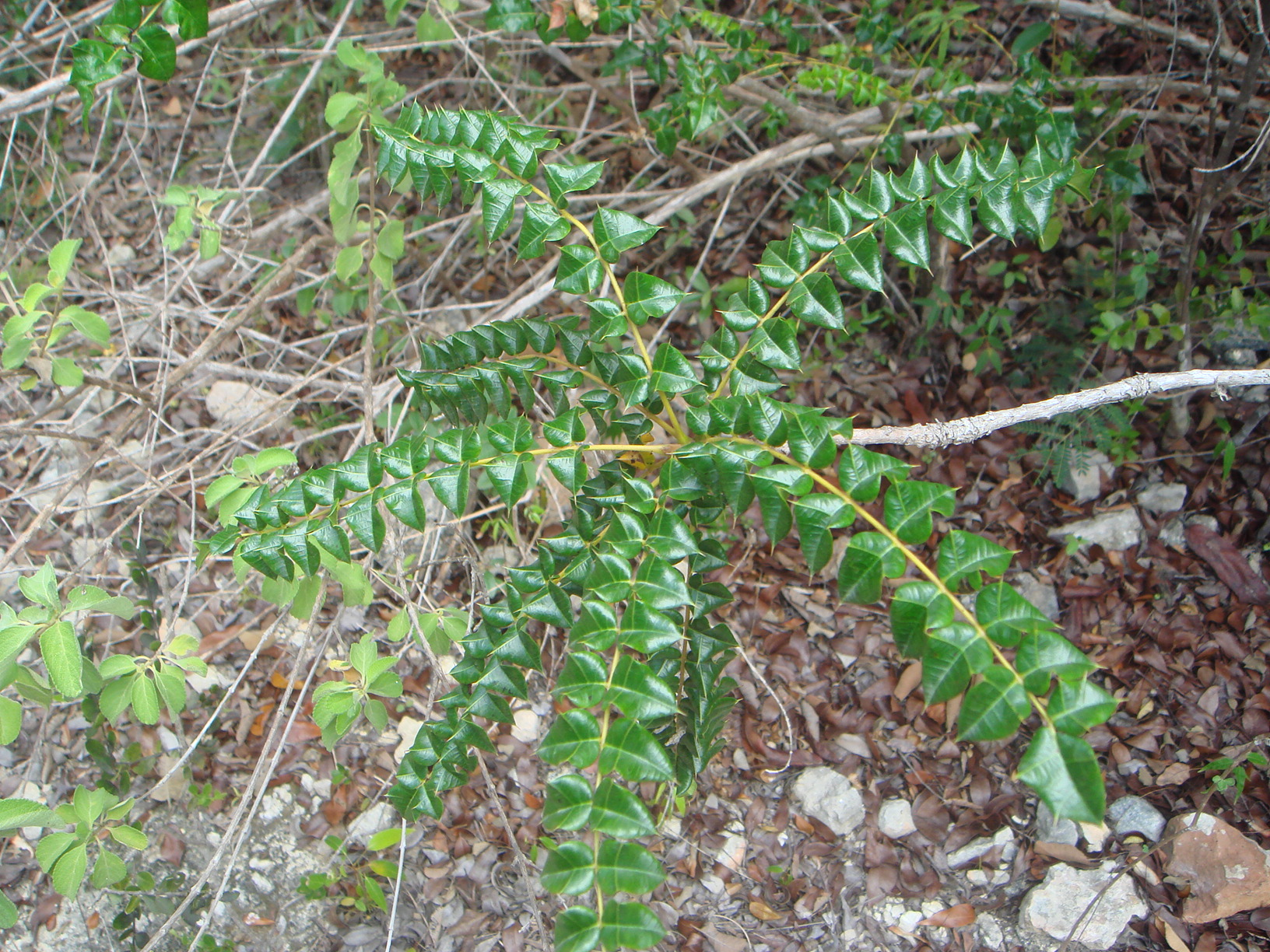
- Comocladia dodonaea

Scientific classification
- Kingdom: Plantae
- Clade: Tracheophytes
- Clade: Angiosperms
- Clade: Eudicots
- Clade: Rosids
- Order: Sapindales
- Family: Anacardiaceae
- Subfamily: Anacardioideae
- Genus: Comocladia; P.Browne

Species
- About 20-26

= Comocladia =

Genus of flowering plants

Comocladia is a genus of flowering plants in the cashew family, Anacardiaceae. It is native to the Americas, where it is distributed in Mexico, Central America, and the Caribbean. Species are known commonly as maidenplums. The term guao is commonly used to refer to Comocladia species in Cuba and the Dominican Republic.

These are shrubs and trees, mostly unbranched. The leaves are divided into opposite pairs of leaflets that usually have toothed or spiny edges. The inflorescences are panicles of flowers growing from the leaf axils. The plants are polygamodioecious, producing male, female, and bisexual flowers. The sepals are red and the corollas are red or purple. The fruit is a drupe covered in the remnants of the flower calyx. It is fleshy with a yellow, red, or black skin.

The plants produce an exudate that turns black on contact with air. It is known for causing contact dermatitis. Of the 26 species in the genus, 17 have been noted to cause dermatitis.

== Taxonomy ==
=== Species ===
Species include:

- Comocladia cordata
- Comocladia cuneata – wedgeleaf maidenplum
- Comocladia dentata – toothed maidenplum, guao (Cuba, Dominican Republic)
- Comocladia dodonaea – poison ash, hogwood (Barbuda), Christmas tree (St. Croix), thumbtack (Tortola), brésillet (Haiti), carrasco (Puerto Rico), guao (Dominican Republic)
- Comocladia domingensis
- Comocladia ebrenbergii
- Comocladia ekmaniana
- Comocladia gilgiana
- Comocladia glabra – guao (Cuba), carrasco (Puerto Rico), chicharrón (Dominican Republic)
- Comocladia gracilis
- Comocladia grandidentata
- Comocladia guatemalensis
- Comocladia hollickii
- Comocladia intermedia
- Comocladia jamaicensis
- Comocladia macrophylla
- Comocladia mollifolia
- Comocladia mollissima
- Comocladia palmeri
- Comocladia parvifolia
- Comocladia pinnatifolia – guao (Dominican Republic), sibliye (Haiti), maiden plum (Jamaica)
- Comocladia platyphylla
- Comocladia pubescens
- Comocladia repanda
- Comocladia undulata
- Comocladia velutina – velvet-leaved maiden plum (Jamaica)
