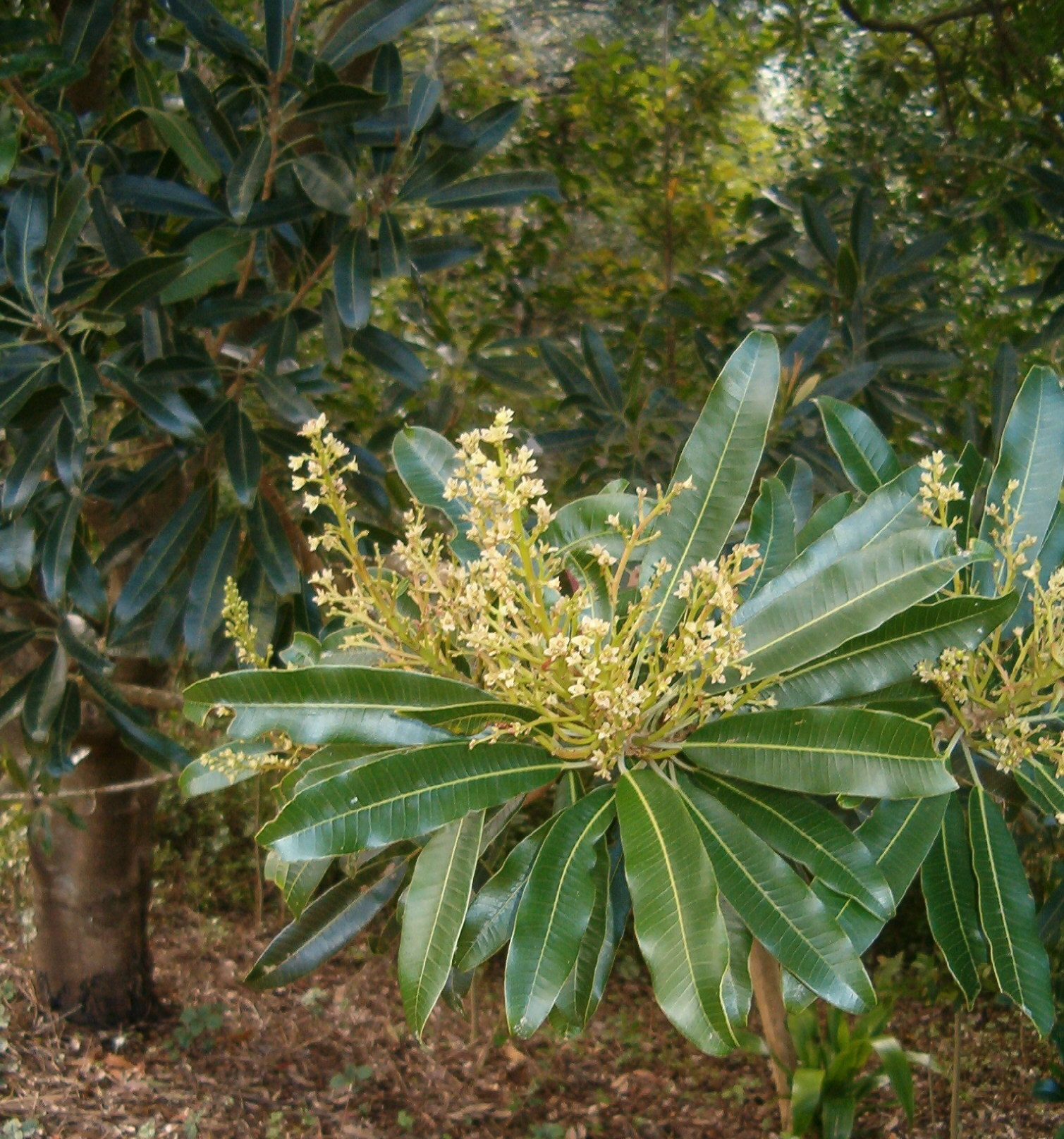
- P. longifolia at Kirstenbosch

Scientific classification
- Kingdom: Plantae
- Clade: Tracheophytes
- Clade: Angiosperms
- Clade: Eudicots
- Clade: Rosids
- Order: Sapindales
- Family: Anacardiaceae
- Subfamily: Anacardioideae
- Genus: Protorhus; Engl.

Type species
- Protorhus longifolia (Bernh.) Engl.

= Protorhus =

Genus of trees

Protorhus is a small genus of Afrotropical trees in the family Anacardiaceae. It is dioecious, with male and female flowers on separate plants.

== Taxonomy ==
Protorhus is placed in tribe Rhoeae, subfamily Anacardioideae of the family Anacardiaceae. The genus Abrahamia with 19 Madagascan taxa was separated from Protorhus in 2004.(Pell 2004)

=== Species ===
The species are:

- Protorhus fulva Engl. – Madagascar
- Protorhus longifolia (Bernh.) Engl. – South Africa
- Protorhus thouarsii Engl.

Formerly listed;

- Protorhus buxifolia H. Perrier, transferred to Abrahamia buxifolia (H. Perrier) Randrian. & Lowry

== Bibliography ==
- Pell, Susan Katherine (May 2004). Molecular systematics of the cashew family (Anacardiaceae) (PDF). Department of Biological Sciences, Louisiana State University. Archived from the original (PhD thesis) on 2008-08-21.
