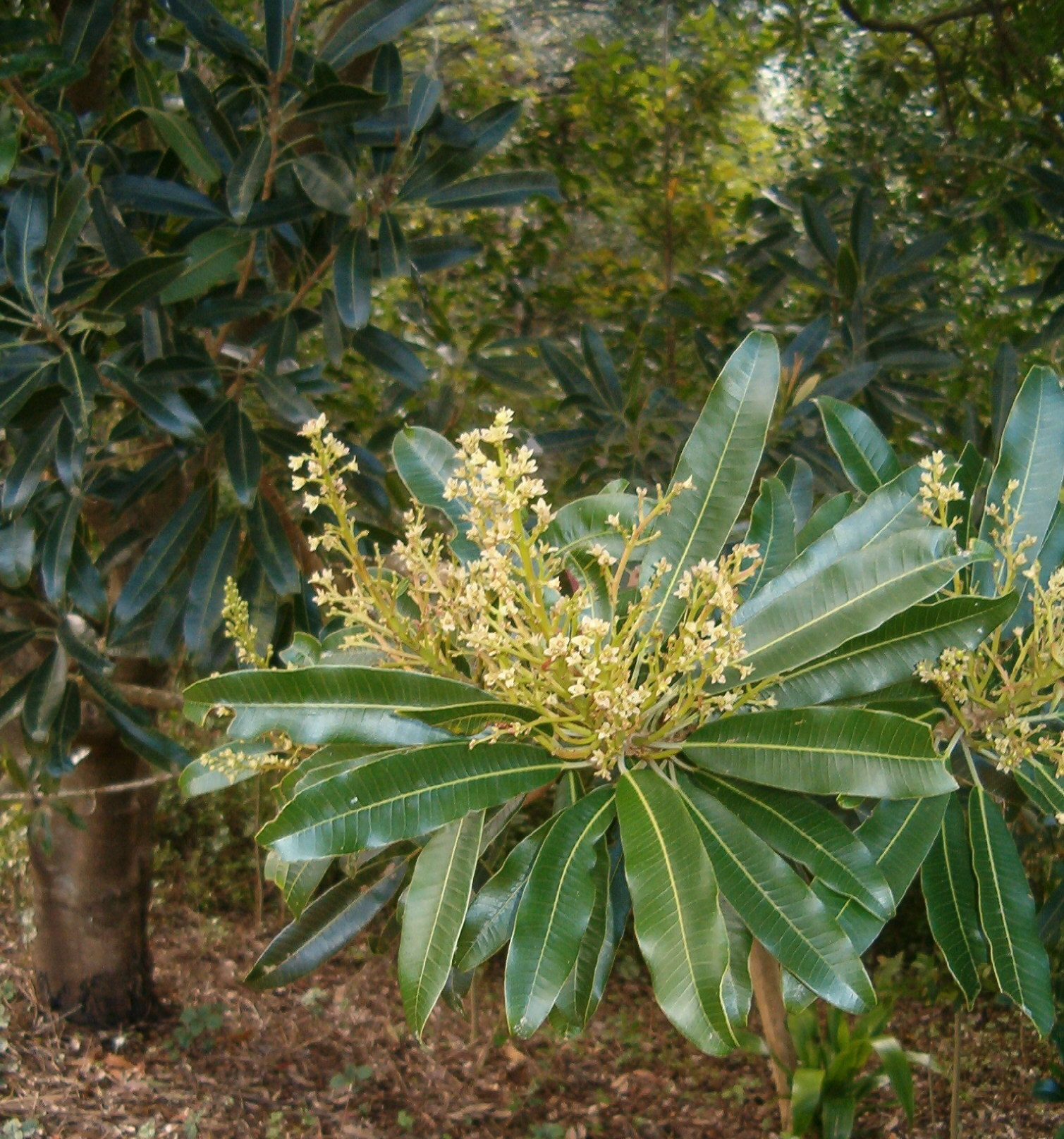

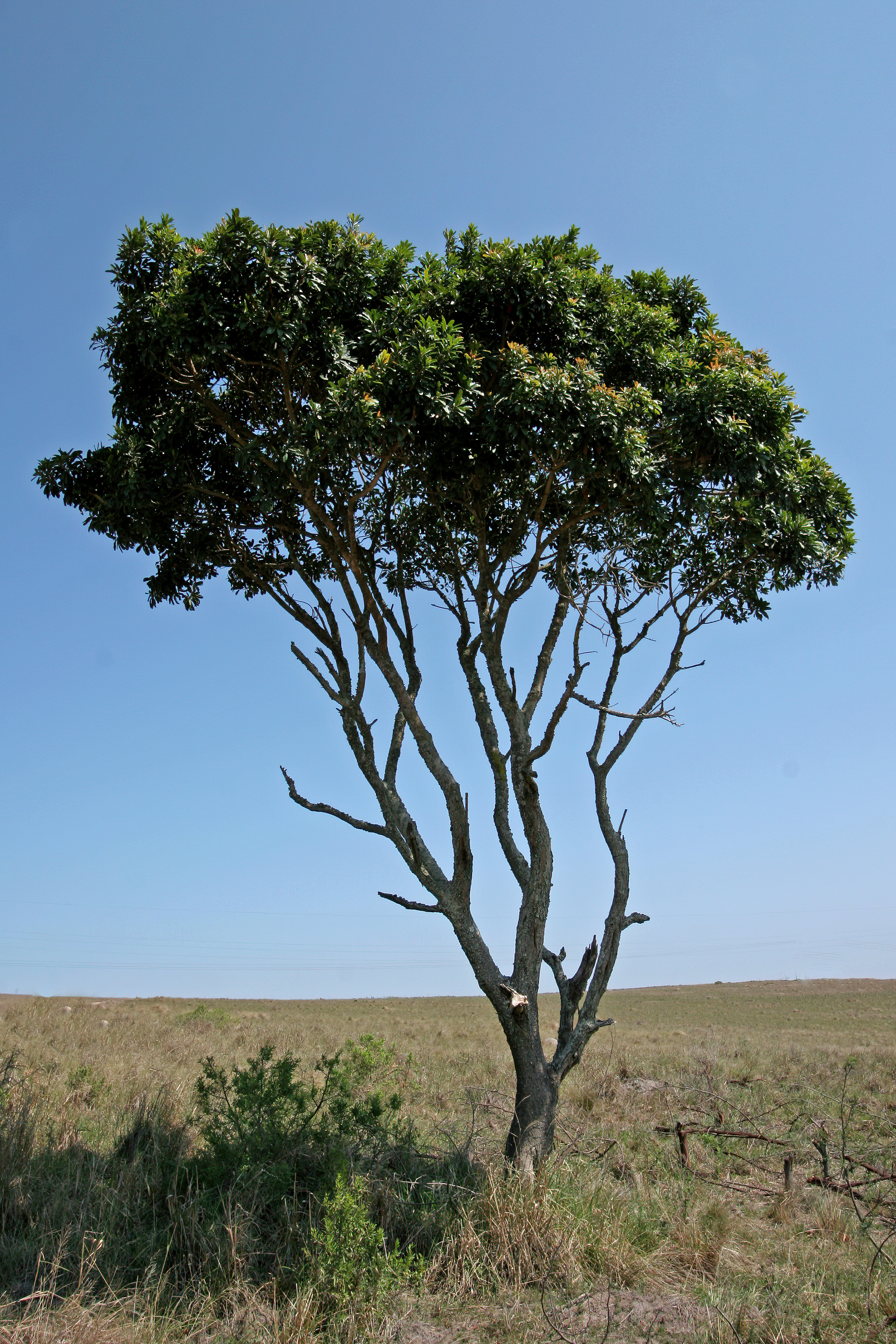

Conservation status
- Least Concern (IUCN 3.1)

Scientific classification
- Kingdom: Plantae
- Clade: Tracheophytes
- Clade: Angiosperms
- Clade: Eudicots
- Clade: Rosids
- Order: Sapindales
- Family: Anacardiaceae
- Genus: Protorhus
- Species: P. longifolia

Binomial name
- Protorhus longifolia (Bernh. ex C.Krauss) Engl., 1881

Synonyms
- Anaphrenium longifolium Bernh., 1844; Rhus longifolia (Bernh.) Sond.

= Protorhus longifolia =

Red beech

Species of tree

Protorhus longifolia, commonly known as red beech, is a medium to large, mostly dioecious species of tree in the family Anacardiaceae. It is native to South Africa and Eswatini, where it occurs in well-watered situations from coastal elevations to 1,250 m. The leafy, evergreen trees have rounded crowns and usually grow between 6 and 10 m tall, but regularly taller in forest.

== Range ==
In South Africa they occur from the Eastern Cape to Limpopo. In Eswatini it is present in the western uplands, and in the Lebombo regions. They occur in coastal, scarp and mistbelt forests, rock outcrops, escarpments, riparian fringes, or in woodland.

== Bole and branches ==
The bole is up to 1 m in diameter in forest. The bark of a young tree is smooth and brown, but becomes darker and rough with age. The branches have a rough texture and retain leaf scars. They exude a sticky milky sap when broken.

== Foliage ==
The trees often carry some strikingly yellow or red leaves, especially in winter or on new growth. The simple leaves resemble Mango leaves, and have a scattered, alternate or subopposite arrangement. They measure up to 15 by 3 cm, and are paler below than above. They are glabrous and leathery in texture, and linear-oblong to narrowly elliptic in shape. The leaf margins may be frilled or wavy and are tightly rolled under.

The primary, lateral veins have a straight and parallel arrangement. They terminate on, and often fork near the leaf margin. There are up to 40 veins a side, which are prominently raised below. They are light in colour, contrasting with the dark, glossy upper surfaces.

== Flowers ==
The flowers are small (±4 mm in diameter) and are carried in axillary or terminal panicles. They are greenish-white (male) or pink to red, and appear in early spring (August to October). The ovary is ovoid and the calyx is saucer-shaped. The floral parts are in fives, but female flowers have three styles.

== Fruit ==
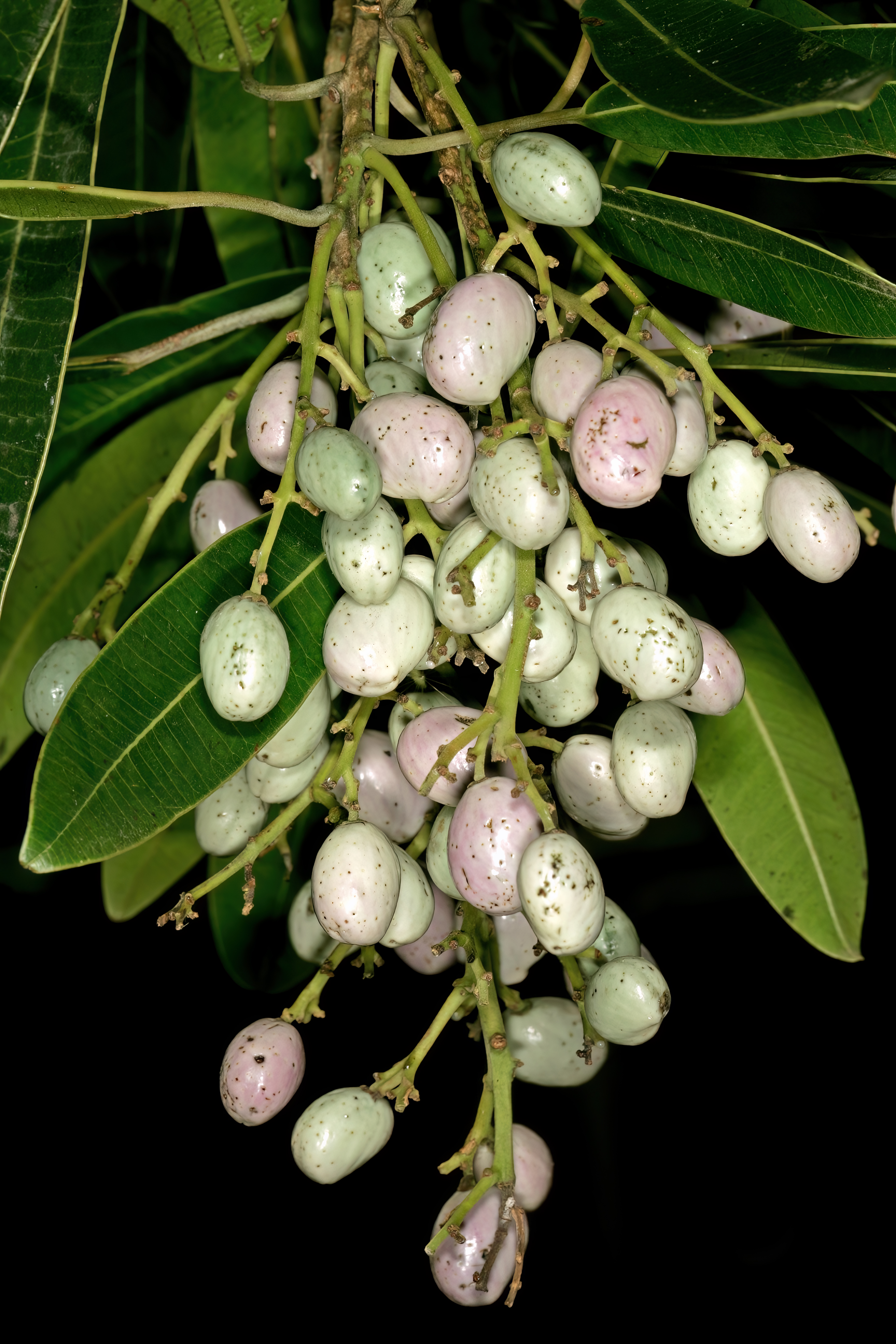
Fruit

The indehiscent fruit which appear from October to December, are smooth, fleshy drupes that mature to a pale mauve colour in autumn. Each contains a single seed. (cf. Ozoroa)

== Species interactions and uses ==
Various forest mammals and birds feed on the fruit while on the tree, or after they are dropped, while the bark and foliage are browsed by Black rhino.

The fine-grained wood has been used for furniture, planks and fence posts, but is not considered very durable. The ground up bark, though somewhat poisonous, is used as "red" muti (Zulu: uMuthi-embomvu). The sticky milky sap has been used a glue, for instance to fix assegai blades to their handles, or as a depilatory.

The species can be cultivated from fresh seed and does well in gardens. They are useful as specimen trees or screening plants, and grow relatively fast, up to 80 cm a year. Though it thrives in warm, moist regions, it is also tolerant of drought and slight frost.

== Gallery ==
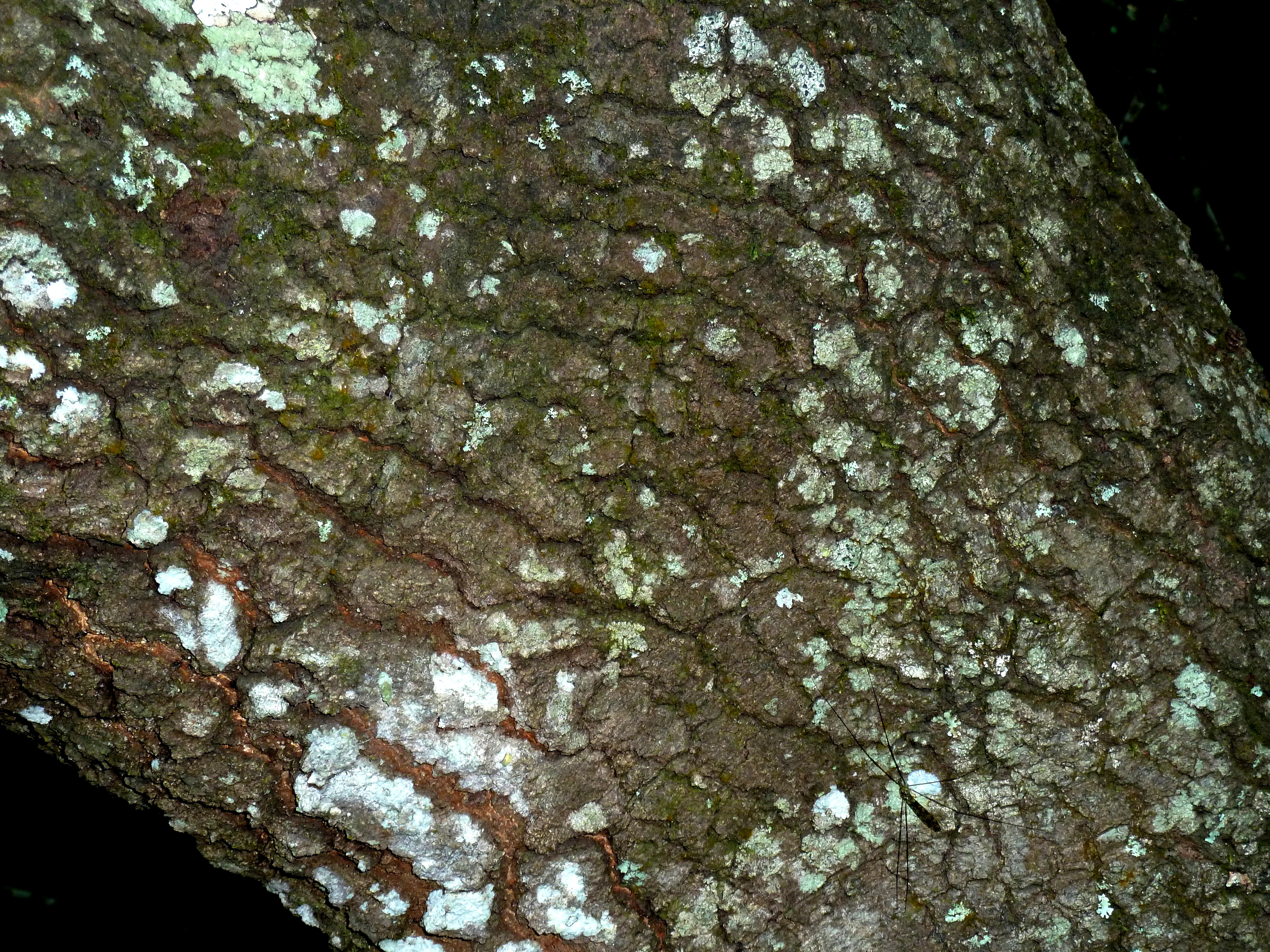
Old bark texture

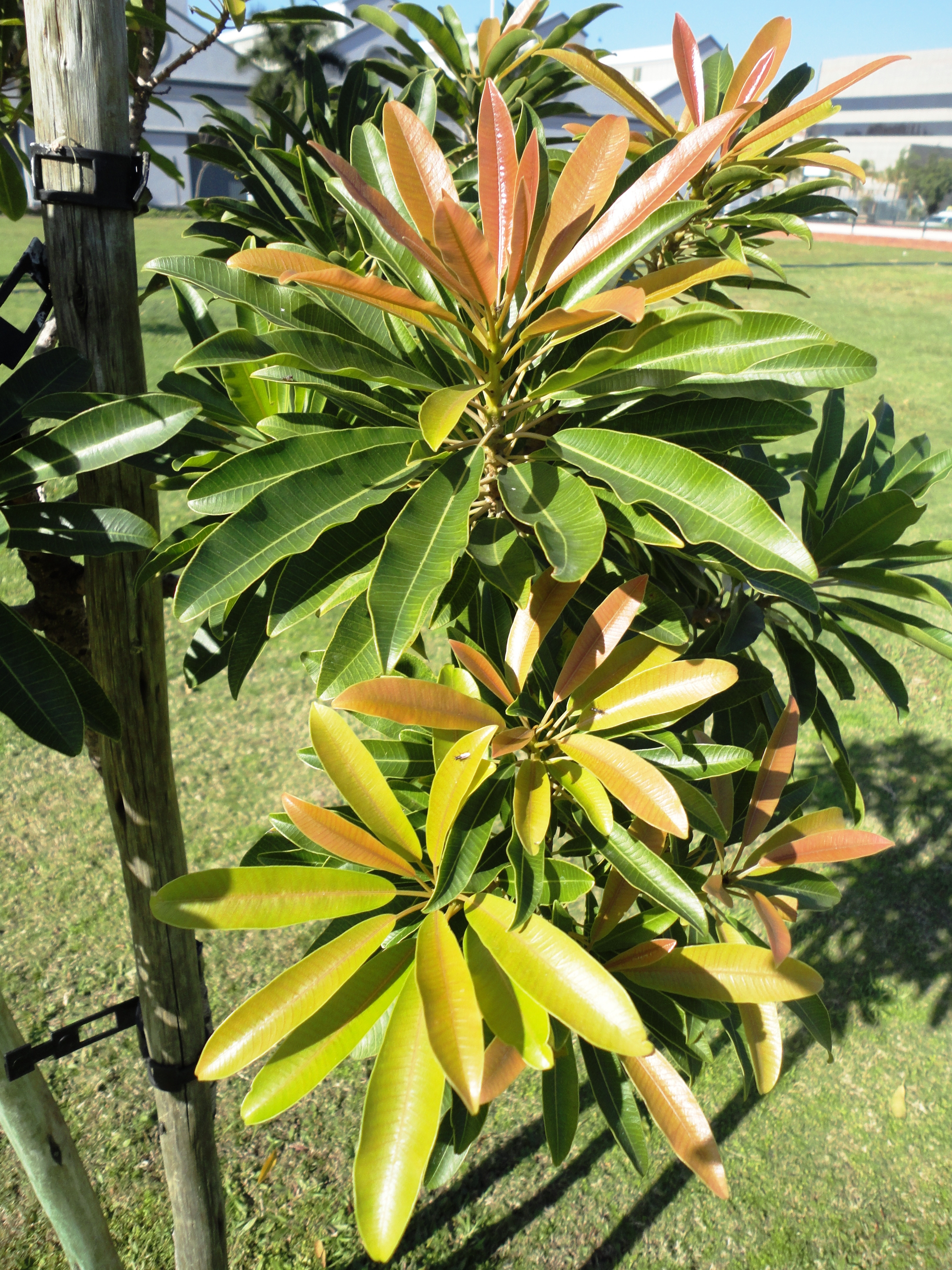
Young foliage

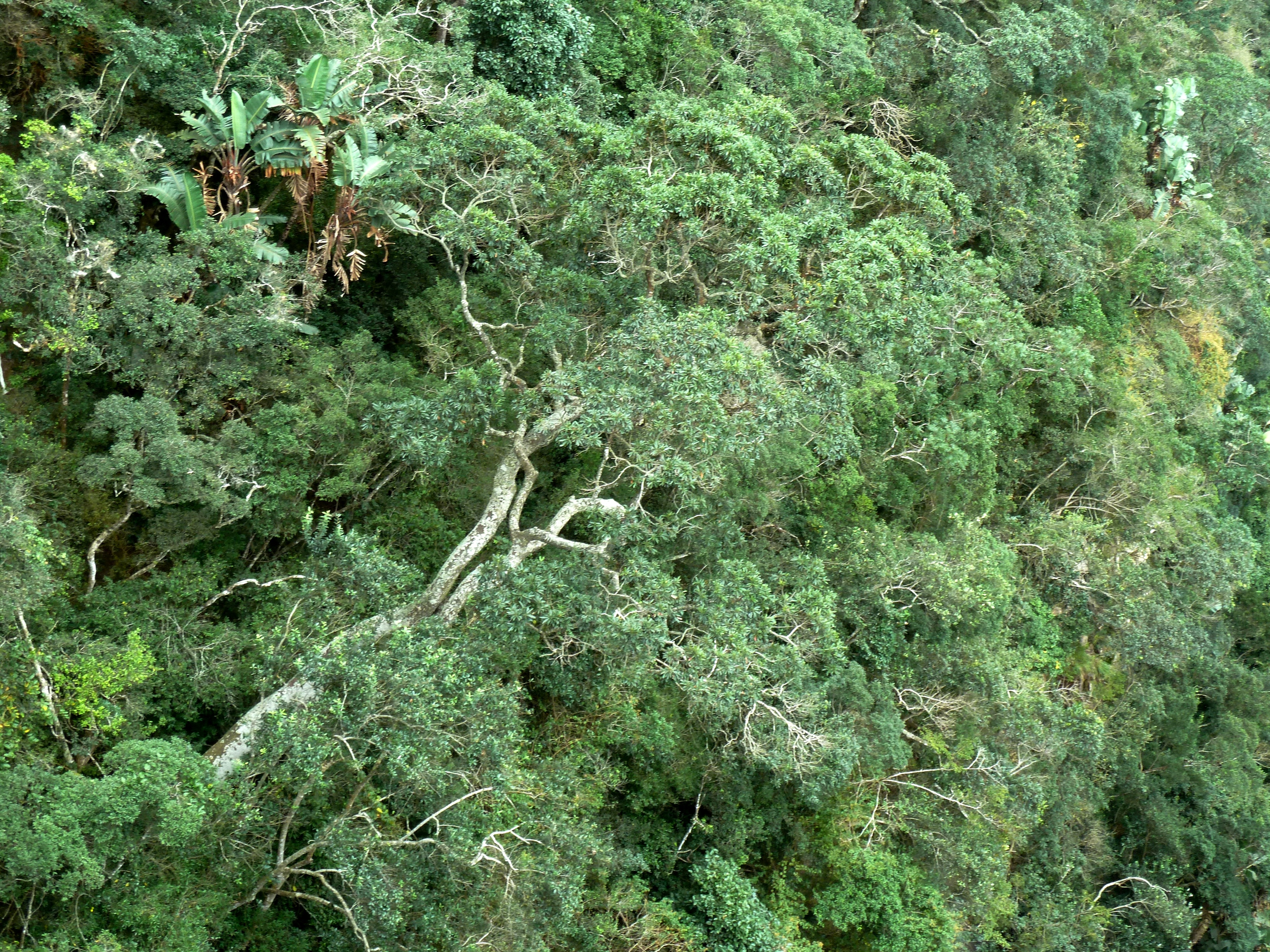
Habit in forest
