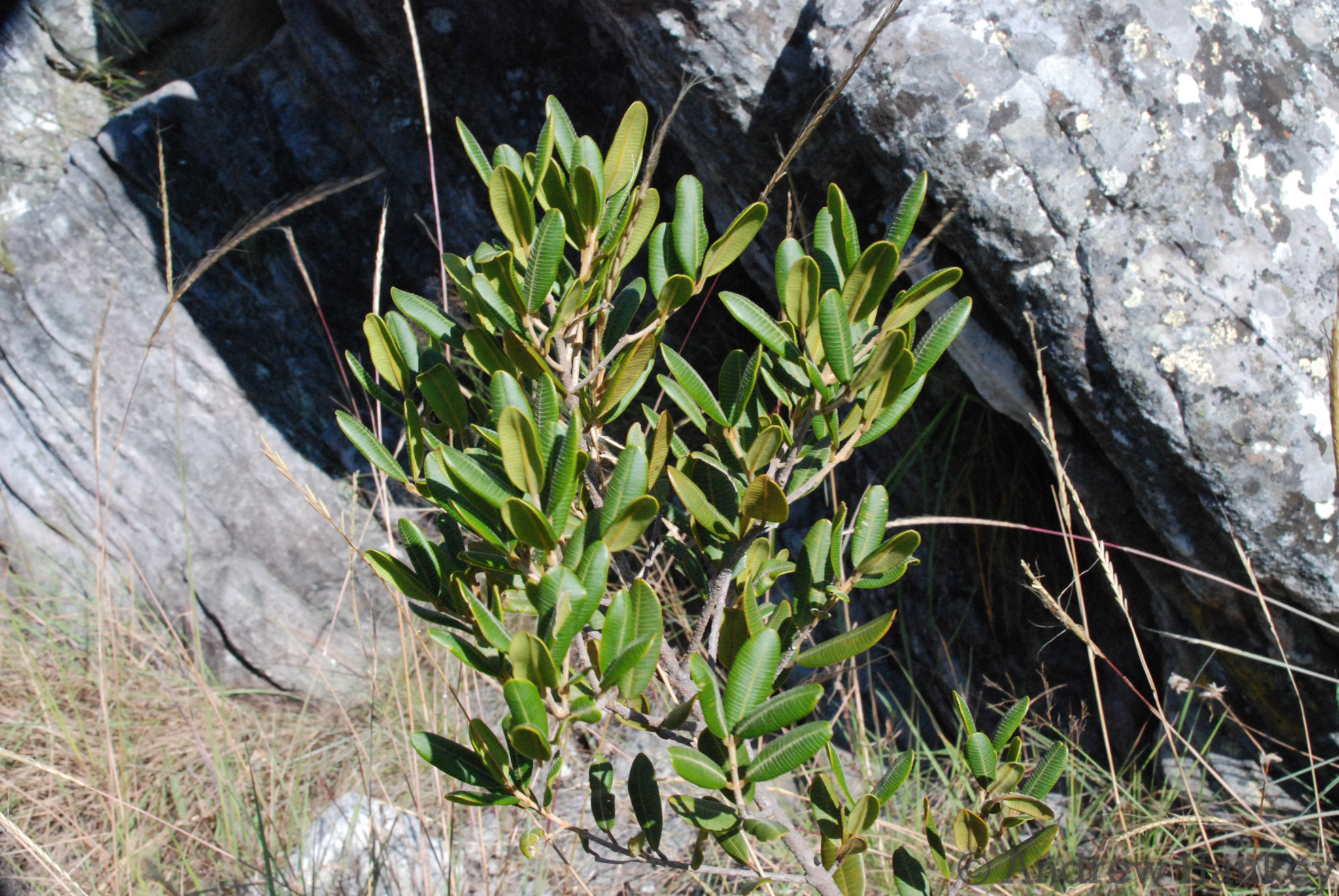
- Abrahamia buxifolia

Scientific classification
- Kingdom: Plantae
- Clade: Tracheophytes
- Clade: Angiosperms
- Clade: Eudicots
- Clade: Rosids
- Order: Sapindales
- Family: Anacardiaceae
- Genus: Abrahamia; Randrian. & Lowry

Species
- See text

= Abrahamia =

Genus of flowering plants

Abrahamia is a genus of flowering plants in the family Anacardiaceae found in Madagascar.

== Taxonomy ==
=== Species ===
As of July 2020, the World Checklist of Selected Plant Families accepts 34 species:

- Abrahamia antongilensis Randrian. & Lowry
- Abrahamia betamponensis Randrian. & Lowry
- Abrahamia buxifolia (H.Perrier) Randrian. & Lowry
- Abrahamia capuronii Randrian. & Lowry
- Abrahamia darainensis Randrian. & Lowry
- Abrahamia deflexa (H.Perrier) Randrian. & Lowry
- Abrahamia delphinensis Randrian. & Lowry
- Abrahamia ditimena (H.Perrier) Randrian. & Lowry
- Abrahamia ellipticarpa Randrian. & Lowry
- Abrahamia elongata Randrian. & Lowry
- Abrahamia grandidieri (Engl.) Randrian. & Lowry
- Abrahamia humbertii (H.Perrier) Randrian. & Lowry
- Abrahamia ibityensis (H.Perrier) Randrian. & Lowry
- Abrahamia itremoensis Randrian. & Lowry
- Abrahamia latifolia (Engl.) Randrian. & Lowry
- Abrahamia lecomtei (H.Perrier) Randrian. & Lowry
- Abrahamia lenticellata Randrian. & Lowry
- Abrahamia littoralis Randrian. & Lowry
- Abrahamia lokobensis Randrian. & Lowry
- Abrahamia longipetiolata Randrian. & Lowry
- Abrahamia louvelii (H.Perrier) Randrian. & Lowry
- Abrahamia minutifolia Randrian. & Lowry
- Abrahamia nitida (Engl.) Randrian. & Lowry
- Abrahamia oblongifolia (Engl.) Randrian. & Lowry
- Abrahamia patrickii Randrian. & Lowry
- Abrahamia pauciflora (Engl. ex H.Perrier) Randrian. & Lowry
- Abrahamia phillipsonii Randrian. & Lowry
- Abrahamia revoluta Randrian. & Lowry
- Abrahamia sambiranensis Randrian. & Lowry
- Abrahamia sericea (Engl.) Randrian. & Lowry
- Abrahamia suarezensis Randrian. & Lowry
- Abrahamia thouvenotii (Lecomte) Randrian. & Lowry
- Abrahamia turkii Randrian. & Lowry
- Abrahamia viguieri (H.Perrier) Randrian. & Lowry
