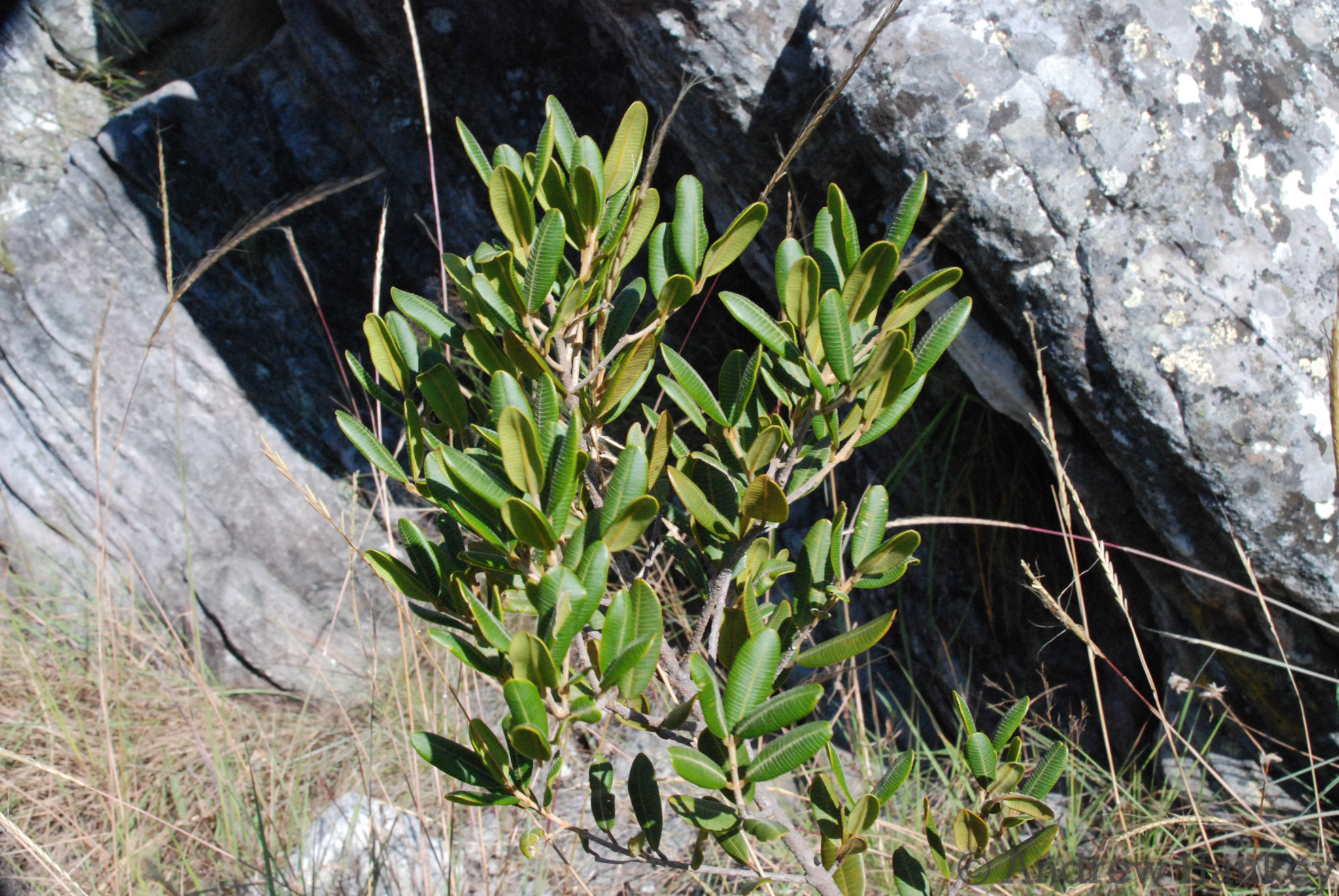

Scientific classification
- Kingdom: Plantae
- Clade: Tracheophytes
- Clade: Angiosperms
- Clade: Eudicots
- Clade: Rosids
- Order: Sapindales
- Family: Anacardiaceae
- Genus: Abrahamia
- Species: A. buxifolia

Binomial name
- Abrahamia buxifolia (H.Perrier) Randrian. & Lowry

Synonyms
- Protorhus buxifolia H.Perrier

= Abrahamia buxifolia =

Species of flowering plant

Abrahamia buxifolia is a species of flowering plant in the family Anacardiaceae. It is native to Madagascar.

== Description ==
Abrahamia buxifolia is a shrub reaching 2–7 m (6.6–23.0 ft) in height. The leaves are mostly opposite, generally obovate to elliptic, measuring 1.5–2.7 cm (0.6–1.1 in) with untoothed edges. The flowers bear pale yellow petals and arise from leaf axils.
