= List of Sapindales of South Africa =

Flowering plants in the order Sapindales recorded from South Africa

Sapindales /sæpɪnˈdeɪliːz/ is an order of flowering plants. The APG III system of 2009 includes it in the clade malvids (in rosids, in eudicots) with nine families: The anthophytes are a grouping of plant taxa bearing flower-like reproductive structures. They were formerly thought to be a clade comprising plants bearing flower-like structures. The group contained the angiosperms - the extant flowering plants, such as roses and grasses - as well as the Gnetales and the extinct Bennettitales.

23,420 species of vascular plant have been recorded in South Africa, making it the sixth most species-rich country in the world and the most species-rich country on the African continent. Of these, 153 species are considered to be threatened. Nine biomes have been described in South Africa: Fynbos, Succulent Karoo, desert, Nama Karoo, grassland, savanna, Albany thickets, the Indian Ocean coastal belt, and forests.

The 2018 South African National Biodiversity Institute's National Biodiversity Assessment plant checklist lists 35,130 taxa in the phyla Anthocerotophyta (hornworts (6)), Anthophyta (flowering plants (33534)), Bryophyta (mosses (685)), Cycadophyta (cycads (42)), Lycopodiophyta (Lycophytes(45)), Marchantiophyta (liverworts (376)), Pinophyta (conifers (33)), and Pteridophyta (cryptogams (408)).

Eight families are represented in the literature. Listed taxa include species, subspecies, varieties, and forms as recorded, some of which have subsequently been allocated to other taxa as synonyms, in which cases the accepted taxon is appended to the listing. Multiple entries under alternative names reflect taxonomic revision over time.

== Anacardiaceae ==
- Family: Anacardiaceae,

=== Anacardium ===
Genus Anacardium:

- Anacardium occidentale L. not indigenous, naturalised

=== Harpephyllum ===
Genus Harpephyllum:

- Harpephyllum afrum Bernh. ex Krauss, indigenous

=== Heeria ===
Genus Heeria:

- Heeria argentea (Thunb.) Meisn. endemic
- Heeria insignis (Delile) Kuntze, accepted as Ozoroa insignis Delile subsp. reticulata (Baker f.) J.B.Gillett, endemic
- Heeria paniculosa (Sond.) Kuntze, accepted as Ozoroa paniculosa (Sond.) R.Fern. & A.Fern. var. paniculosa, indigenous

=== Lannea ===
Genus Lannea:

- Lannea discolor (Sond.) Engl. indigenous
- Lannea edulis (Sond.) Engl. indigenous
  - Lannea edulis (Sond.) Engl. var. edulis, indigenous
- Lannea gossweileri Exell & MendonÃ§a, indigenous
  - Lannea gossweileri Exell & MendonÃ§a subsp. tomentella (R.Fern. & A.Fern.) J.B.Gillett, indigenous
- Lannea schweinfurthii (Engl.) Engl. indigenous
  - Lannea schweinfurthii (Engl.) Engl. var. stuhlmannii (Engl.) Kokwaro, indigenous

=== Laurophyllus ===
Genus Laurophyllus:

- Laurophyllus capensis Thunb. endemic

=== Loxostylis ===
Genus Loxostylis:

- Loxostylis alata A.Spreng. ex Rchb. endemic

=== Mangifera ===
Genus Mangifera:

- Mangifera indica L. not indigenous, naturalised

=== Ozoroa ===
Genus Ozoroa:

- Ozoroa albicans R.Fern. & A.Fern. endemic
- Ozoroa barbertonensis Retief, endemic
- Ozoroa concolor (C.Presl ex Sond.) De Winter, indigenous
- Ozoroa crassinervia (Engl.) R.Fern. & A.Fern. indigenous
- Ozoroa dispar (C.Presl) R.Fern. & A.Fern. indigenous
- Ozoroa engleri R.Fern. & A.Fern. indigenous
- Ozoroa mucronata (Bernh.) R.Fern. & A.Fern. endemic
- Ozoroa namaensis (Schinz & Dinter) R.Fern. indigenous
- Ozoroa namaquensis (Sprague) Von Teichman & A.E.van Wyk, indigenous
- Ozoroa obovata (Oliv.) R.Fern. & A.Fern. indigenous
  - Ozoroa obovata (Oliv.) R.Fern. & A.Fern. var. elliptica R.Fern. & A.Fern. indigenous
  - Ozoroa obovata (Oliv.) R.Fern. & A.Fern. var. obovata, indigenous
- Ozoroa paniculosa (Sond.) R.Fern. & A.Fern. indigenous
  - Ozoroa paniculosa (Sond.) R.Fern. & A.Fern. var. paniculosa, indigenous
  - Ozoroa paniculosa (Sond.) R.Fern. & A.Fern. var. salicina (Sond.) R.Fern. & A.Fern. indigenous
- Ozoroa sphaerocarpa R.Fern. & A.Fern. indigenous

=== Protorhus ===
Genus Protorhus:

- Protorhus longifolia (Bernh.) Engl. indigenous
- Protorhus namaquensis Sprague, accepted as Ozoroa namaquensis (Sprague) Von Teichman & A.E.van Wyk

=== Rhus ===
Genus Rhus:

- Rhus acocksii Moffett, accepted as Searsia acocksii (Moffett) Moffett, endemic
- Rhus albomarginata Sond. accepted as Searsia albomarginata (Sond.) Moffett, endemic
- Rhus angustifolia L. accepted as Searsia angustifolia (L.) F.A.Barkley, endemic
- Rhus batophylla Codd, accepted as Searsia batophylla (Codd) Moffett, endemic
- Rhus bolusii Sond. ex Engl. accepted as Searsia bolusii (Sond. ex Engl.) Moffett, indigenous
- Rhus burchellii Sond. ex Engl. accepted as Searsia burchellii (Sond. ex Engl.) Moffett, indigenous
- Rhus carnosula Schonland, accepted as Searsia carnosula (Schonland) Moffett, endemic
- Rhus chirindensis Baker f. accepted as Searsia chirindensis (Baker f.) Moffett, indigenous
- Rhus ciliata Licht. ex Schult. accepted as Searsia ciliata (Licht. ex Schult.) A.J.Mill. indigenous
- Rhus coriacea Engl. accepted as Searsia magalismontana (Sond.) Moffett subsp. magalismontana, present
- Rhus crenata Thunb. accepted as Searsia crenata (Thunb.) Moffett, endemic
- Rhus cuneifolia L.f. accepted as Searsia cuneifolia (L.f.) F.A.Barkley, endemic
- Rhus dentata Thunb. accepted as Searsia dentata (Thunb.) F.A.Barkley, present
- Rhus discolor E.Mey. ex Sond. accepted as Searsia discolor (E.Mey. ex Sond.) Moffett, indigenous
- Rhus dissecta Thunb. accepted as Searsia dissecta (Thunb.) Moffett, endemic
- Rhus divaricata Eckl. & Zeyh. accepted as Searsia divaricata (Eckl. & Zeyh.) Moffett, indigenous
- Rhus dracomontana Moffett, accepted as Searsia dracomontana (Moffett) Moffett, endemic
- Rhus dregeana Sond. accepted as Searsia dregeana (Sond.) Moffett, indigenous
- Rhus engleri Britten, accepted as Searsia engleri (Britten) Moffett, endemic
- Rhus erosa Thunb. accepted as Searsia erosa (Thunb.) Moffett, present
- Rhus fastigata Eckl. & Zeyh. accepted as Searsia fastigata (Eckl. & Zeyh.) Moffett, endemic
- Rhus galpinii Schinz, accepted as Searsia grandidens (Harv. ex Engl.) Moffett, present
- Rhus gerrardii (Harv. ex Engl.) Diels, accepted as Searsia gerrardii (Harv. ex Engl.) Moffett, indigenous
- Rhus glabra L. not indigenous, naturalised, invasive
- Rhus glauca Thunb. accepted as Searsia glauca (Thunb.) Moffett, endemic
- Rhus glaucovirens Engl. accepted as Searsia zeyheri (Sond.) Moffett, present
- Rhus gracillima Engl. accepted as Searsia gracillima (Engl.) Moffett, endemic
  - Rhus gracillima Engl. var. glaberrima Schonland, accepted as Searsia gracillima (Engl.) Moffett var. glaberrima (Schonland) Moffett, endemic
- Rhus grandidens Harv. ex Engl. accepted as Searsia grandidens (Harv. ex Engl.) Moffett, indigenous
- Rhus grandifolia Engl. accepted as Searsia discolor (E.Mey. ex Sond.) Moffett, present
- Rhus gueinzii Sond. accepted as Searsia gueinzii (Sond.) F.A.Barkley, indigenous
- Rhus harveyi Moffett, accepted as Searsia harveyi (Moffett) Moffett, indigenous
- Rhus horrida Eckl. & Zeyh. accepted as Searsia horrida (Eckl. & Zeyh.) Moffett, endemic
- Rhus incisa L.f. accepted as Searsia incisa (L.f.) F.A.Barkley, indigenous
  - Rhus incisa L.f. var. effusa (C.Presl) R.Fern. accepted as Searsia incisa (L.f.) F.A.Barkley var. effusa (C.Presl) Moffett, endemic
- Rhus keetii Schonland, accepted as Searsia keetii (Schonland) Moffett, endemic
- Rhus kirkii Oliv. accepted as Searsia kirkii (Oliv.) Moffett
- Rhus krebsiana C.Presl ex Engl. accepted as Searsia krebsiana (C.Presl ex Engl.) Moffett, indigenous
- Rhus kwazuluana Moffett, accepted as Searsia kwazuluana (Moffett) Moffett, endemic
- Rhus laevigata L. accepted as Searsia laevigata (L.) F.A.Barkley, endemic
  - Rhus laevigata L. var. laevigata forma cangoana, accepted as Searsia laevigata (L.) F.A.Barkley var. laevigata forma congoana, endemic
  - Rhus laevigata L. var. laevigata forma laevigata, accepted as Searsia laevigata (L.) F.A.Barkley var. laevigata forma laevigata, endemic
  - Rhus laevigata L. var. villosa (L.f.) R.Fern. accepted as Searsia laevigata (L.) F.A.Barkley var. villosa (L.f.) Moffett, present
- Rhus lancea L.f. accepted as Searsia lancea (L.f.) F.A.Barkley, indigenous
- Rhus leptodictya Diels, accepted as Searsia leptodictya (Diels) T.S.Yi, A.J.Mill. & J.Wen forma leptodictya, indigenous
- Rhus longispina Eckl. & Zeyh. accepted as Searsia longispina (Eckl. & Zeyh.) Moffett, endemic
- Rhus lucens Hutch. accepted as Searsia lucens (Hutch.) Moffett
- Rhus lucida L. accepted as Searsia lucida (L.) F.A.Barkley, indigenous
  - Rhus lucida L. forma elliptica (Sond.) Moffett, accepted as Searsia lucida (L.) F.A.Barkley forma elliptica (Sond.) Moffett, endemic
  - Rhus lucida L. forma scoparia (Eckl. & Zeyh.) Moffett, accepted as Searsia lucida (L.) F.A.Barkley forma scoparia (Eckl. & Zeyh.) Moffett, endemic
- Rhus magalismontana Sond. accepted as Searsia magalismontana (Sond.) Moffett, indigenous
  - Rhus magalismontana Sond. subsp. coddii R.Fern. & (A.Fern.) Moffett, accepted as Searsia magalismontana (Sond.) Moffett subsp. coddii (R.Fern. & A.Fern.) Moffett, endemic
  - Rhus magalismontana Sond. subsp. trifoliolata (Baker f.) Moffett, accepted as Searsia magalismontana (Sond.) Moffett subsp. trifoliolata (Baker f.) Moffett, indigenous
- Rhus margaretae Schonland, accepted as Searsia rigida (Mill.) F.A.Barkley var. rigida, indigenous
- Rhus maricoana Moffett, accepted as Searsia maricoana (Moffett) Moffett, endemic
- Rhus marlothii Engl. accepted as Searsia marlothii (Engl.) Moffett
- Rhus milleri R.Fern. & A.Fern. accepted as Searsia hybrid
- Rhus montana Diels, accepted as Searsia montana (Diels) Moffett, indigenous
- Rhus natalensis Bernh. ex C.Krauss, accepted as Searsia natalensis (Bernh. ex C.Krauss) F.A.Barkley, indigenous
- Rhus nebulosa Schonland, accepted as Searsia nebulosa (Schonland) Moffett, indigenous
  - Rhus nebulosa Schonland forma pubescens Moffett, accepted as Searsia nebulosa (Schonland) Moffett forma pubescens (Moffett) Moffett, endemic
- Rhus pallens Eckl. & Zeyh. accepted as Searsia pallens (Eckl. & Zeyh.) Moffett, indigenous
- Rhus pendulina Jacq. accepted as Searsia pendulina (Jacq.) Moffett, indigenous
- Rhus pentheri Zahlbr. accepted as Searsia pentheri (Zahlbr.) Moffett, indigenous
- Rhus pondoensis Schonland, accepted as Searsia pondoensis (Schonland) Moffett, endemic
- Rhus populifolia E.Mey. ex Sond. accepted as Searsia populifolia (E.Mey. ex Sond.) Moffett, indigenous
- Rhus problematodes Merxm. & Roessler, accepted as Searsia problematodes (Merxm. & Roessler) Moffett
- Rhus pterota C.Presl, accepted as Searsia pterota (C.Presl) Moffett, endemic
- Rhus puberula Eckl. & Zeyh. accepted as Searsia pyroides (Burch.) Moffett var. pyroides, present
- Rhus pygmaea Moffett, accepted as Searsia pygmaea (Moffett) Moffett, endemic
- Rhus pyroides Burch. var. dinteri (Engl.) Moffett, accepted as Searsia pyroides (Burch.) Moffett var. dinteri (Engl.) Moffett
  - Rhus pyroides Burch. var. gracilis (Engl.) Burtt Davy, accepted as Searsia pyroides (Burch.) Moffett var. gracilis (Engl.) Moffett, indigenous
  - Rhus pyroides Burch. var. integrifolia (Engl.) Moffett, accepted as Searsia pyroides (Burch.) Moffett var. integrifolia (Engl.) Moffett, indigenous
  - Rhus pyroides Burch. var. puberula (Eckl. & Zeyh.) Schonland, accepted as Searsia pyroides (Burch.) Moffett var. pyroides, present
- Rhus quartiniana A.Rich. accepted as Searsia quartiniana (A.Rich.) A.J.Mill.
- Rhus refracta Eckl. & Zeyh. accepted as Searsia refracta (Eckl. & Zeyh.) Moffett, endemic
- Rhus rehmanniana Engl. accepted as Searsia rehmanniana (Engl.) Moffett, indigenous
  - Rhus rehmanniana Engl. var. glabrata (Sond.) Moffett, accepted as Searsia rehmanniana (Engl.) Moffett var. glabrata (Sond.) Moffett, indigenous
- Rhus rigida Mill. accepted as Searsia rigida (Mill.) F.A.Barkley, indigenous
  - Rhus rigida Mill. var. dentata (Engl.) Moffett, accepted as Searsia rigida (Mill.) F.A.Barkley var. dentata (Engl.) Moffett, indigenous
  - Rhus rigida Mill. var. margaretae Burtt Davy ex Moffett, accepted as Searsia rigida (Mill.) F.A.Barkley var. margaretae (Burtt Davy ex Moffett) Moffett, indigenous
- Rhus rimosa Eckl. & Zeyh. accepted as Searsia rimosa (Eckl. & Zeyh.) Moffett, endemic
- Rhus rogersii Schonland, accepted as Searsia rogersii (Schonland) Moffett, indigenous
- Rhus rosmarinifolia Vahl, accepted as Searsia rosmarinifolia (Vahl) F.A.Barkley, endemic
- Rhus rudatisii Engl. accepted as Searsia rudatisii (Engl.) Moffett, endemic
- Rhus scytophylla Eckl. & Zeyh. accepted as Searsia scytophylla (Eckl. & Zeyh.) Moffett, indigenous
  - Rhus scytophylla Eckl. & Zeyh. var. dentata Moffett, accepted as Searsia scytophylla (Eckl. & Zeyh.) Moffett var. dentata (Moffett) Moffett, endemic
- Rhus sekhukhuniensis Moffett, accepted as Searsia sekhukhuniensis (Moffett) Moffett, endemic
- Rhus steingroeveri Engl. accepted as Searsia populifolia (E.Mey. ex Sond.) Moffett
- Rhus stenophylla Eckl. & Zeyh. accepted as Searsia stenophylla (Eckl. & Zeyh.) Moffett, endemic
- Rhus succedanea L. accepted as Toxicodendron succedaneum (L.) Kuntze, not indigenous, naturalised
- Rhus tomentosa L. accepted as Searsia tomentosa (L.) F.A.Barkley, present
- Rhus transvaalensis Engl. accepted as Searsia transvaalensis (Engl.) Moffett, present
- Rhus tridactyla Burch. accepted as Searsia tridactyla (Burch.) Moffett, endemic
- Rhus tumulicola S.Moore var. meeuseana (R.Fern. & A.Fern.) Moffett, indigenous
  - Rhus tumulicola S.Moore var. meeuseana (R.Fern. & A.Fern.) Moffett forma pumila, accepted as Searsia tumulicola (S.Moore) Moffett var. meeuseana (R.Fern. & A.Fern.) Moffett forma pumila, endemic
  - Rhus tumulicola S.Moore var. tumulicola, accepted as Searsia tumulicola (S.Moore) Moffett var. tumulicola, indigenous
- Rhus undulata Jacq. accepted as Searsia undulata (Jacq.) T.S.Yi, A.J.Mill. & J.Wen, indigenous
- Rhus villosissima Engl. accepted as Searsia discolor (E.Mey. ex Sond.) Moffett, present
- Rhus volkii Suess. accepted as Searsia volkii (Suess.) Moffett
- Rhus wilmsii Diels, accepted as Searsia wilmsii (Diels) Moffett, endemic
- Rhus zeyheri Sond. accepted as Searsia zeyheri (Sond.) Moffett, endemic

=== Schinus ===
Genus Schinus:

- Schinus molle L. not indigenous, naturalised, invasive
- Schinus terebinthifolius Raddi, not indigenous, cultivated, naturalised, invasive
  - Schinus terebinthifolius Raddi var. acutifolius Engl. accepted as Schinus terebinthifolius Raddi, not indigenous, naturalised

=== Sclerocarya ===
Genus Sclerocarya:

- Sclerocarya birrea (A.Rich.) Hochst. indigenous
  - Sclerocarya birrea (A.Rich.) Hochst. subsp. afra (Sond.) Kokwaro, indigenous

=== Searsia ===
Genus Searsia:

- Searsia acocksii (Moffett) Moffett, endemic
- Searsia albomarginata (Sond.) Moffett, endemic
- Searsia angustifolia (L.) F.A.Barkley, endemic
- Searsia batophylla (Codd) Moffett, endemic
- Searsia bolusii (Sond. ex Engl.) Moffett, indigenous
- Searsia burchellii (Sond. ex Engl.) Moffett, indigenous
- Searsia carnosula (Schonland) Moffett, endemic
- Searsia chirindensis (Baker f.) Moffett, indigenous
- Searsia ciliata (Licht. ex Schult.) A.J.Mill. indigenous
- Searsia crenata (Thunb.) Moffett, endemic
- Searsia cuneifolia (L.f.) F.A.Barkley, endemic
- Searsia dentata (Thunb.) F.A.Barkley, indigenous
- Searsia discolor (E.Mey. ex Sond.) Moffett, indigenous
- Searsia dissecta (Thunb.) Moffett, endemic
- Searsia divaricata (Eckl. & Zeyh.) Moffett, indigenous
- Searsia dracomontana (Moffett) Moffett, endemic
- Searsia dregeana (Sond.) Moffett, indigenous
- Searsia engleri (Britten) Moffett, endemic
- Searsia erosa (Thunb.) Moffett, indigenous
- Searsia fastigata (Eckl. & Zeyh.) Moffett, endemic
- Searsia gerrardii (Harv. ex Engl.) Moffett, indigenous
- Searsia glauca (Thunb.) Moffett, endemic
- Searsia gracillima (Engl.) Moffett, endemic
  - Searsia gracillima (Engl.) Moffett var. glaberrima (Schonland) Moffett, endemic
  - Searsia gracillima (Engl.) Moffett var. gracillima, endemic
- Searsia grandidens (Harv. ex Engl.) Moffett, indigenous
- Searsia gueinzii (Sond.) F.A.Barkley, indigenous
- Searsia harveyi (Moffett) Moffett, indigenous
- Searsia horrida (Eckl. & Zeyh.) Moffett, endemic
- Searsia incisa (L.f.) F.A.Barkley, endemic
  - Searsia incisa (L.f.) F.A.Barkley var. effusa (C.Presl) Moffett, endemic
  - Searsia incisa (L.f.) F.A.Barkley var. incisa, endemic
- Searsia keetii (Schonland) Moffett, endemic
- Searsia krebsiana (C.Presl ex Engl.) Moffett, indigenous
- Searsia kwazuluana (Moffett) Moffett, endemic
- Searsia laevigata (L.) F.A.Barkley, endemic
  - Searsia laevigata (L.) F.A.Barkley var. laevigata forma congoana, endemic
  - Searsia laevigata (L.) F.A.Barkley var. laevigata forma laevigata, endemic
  - Searsia laevigata (L.) F.A.Barkley var. villosa (L.f.) Moffett, endemic
- Searsia lancea (L.f.) F.A.Barkley, indigenous
- Searsia leptodictya (Diels) T.S.Yi, A.J.Mill. & J.Wen, indigenous
  - Searsia leptodictya (Diels) T.S.Yi, A.J.Mill. & J.Wen forma leptodictya, indigenous
- Searsia longispina (Eckl. & Zeyh.) Moffett, endemic
- Searsia lucida (L.) F.A.Barkley, indigenous
  - Searsia lucida (L.) F.A.Barkley forma elliptica (Sond.) Moffett, endemic
  - Searsia lucida (L.) F.A.Barkley forma lucida, indigenous
  - Searsia lucida (L.) F.A.Barkley forma scoparia (Eckl. & Zeyh.) Moffett, endemic
- Searsia magalismontana (Sond.) Moffett, indigenous
  - Searsia magalismontana (Sond.) Moffett subsp. coddii (R.Fern. & A.Fern.) Moffett, endemic
  - Searsia magalismontana (Sond.) Moffett subsp. magalismontana, indigenous
  - Searsia magalismontana (Sond.) Moffett subsp. trifoliolata (Baker f.) Moffett, indigenous
- Searsia maricoana (Moffett) Moffett, endemic
- Searsia montana (Diels) Moffett, indigenous
- Searsia natalensis (Bernh. ex C.Krauss) F.A.Barkley, indigenous
- Searsia nebulosa (Schonland) Moffett, indigenous
  - Searsia nebulosa (Schonland) Moffett forma nebulosa, indigenous
  - Searsia nebulosa (Schonland) Moffett forma pubescens (Moffett) Moffett, endemic
- Searsia pallens (Eckl. & Zeyh.) Moffett, indigenous
- Searsia pendulina (Jacq.) Moffett, indigenous
- Searsia pentheri (Zahlbr.) Moffett, indigenous
- Searsia pondoensis (Schonland) Moffett, endemic
- Searsia populifolia (E.Mey. ex Sond.) Moffett, indigenous
- Searsia pterota (C.Presl) Moffett, endemic
- Searsia pygmaea (Moffett) Moffett, endemic
- Searsia pyroides (Burch.) Moffett, indigenous
  - Searsia pyroides (Burch.) Moffett var. gracilis (Engl.) Moffett, indigenous
  - Searsia pyroides (Burch.) Moffett var. integrifolia (Engl.) Moffett, indigenous
  - Searsia pyroides (Burch.) Moffett var. pyroides, indigenous
- Searsia refracta (Eckl. & Zeyh.) Moffett, endemic
- Searsia rehmanniana (Engl.) Moffett, indigenous
  - Searsia rehmanniana (Engl.) Moffett var. glabrata (Sond.) Moffett, indigenous
  - Searsia rehmanniana (Engl.) Moffett var. rehmanniana, indigenous
- Searsia rigida (Mill.) F.A.Barkley, indigenous
  - Searsia rigida (Mill.) F.A.Barkley var. dentata (Engl.) Moffett, indigenous
  - Searsia rigida (Mill.) F.A.Barkley var. margaretae (Burtt Davy ex Moffett) Moffett, indigenous
  - Searsia rigida (Mill.) F.A.Barkley var. rigida, indigenous
- Searsia rimosa (Eckl. & Zeyh.) Moffett, endemic
- Searsia rogersii (Schonland) Moffett, indigenous
- Searsia rosmarinifolia (Vahl) F.A.Barkley, endemic
- Searsia rudatisii (Engl.) Moffett, endemic
- Searsia scytophylla (Eckl. & Zeyh.) Moffett, endemic
  - Searsia scytophylla (Eckl. & Zeyh.) Moffett var. dentata (Moffett) Moffett, endemic
  - Searsia scytophylla (Eckl. & Zeyh.) Moffett var. scytophylla, endemic
- Searsia sekhukhuniensis (Moffett) Moffett, endemic
- Searsia stenophylla (Eckl. & Zeyh.) Moffett, endemic
- Searsia tenuinervis (Engl.) Moffett, indigenous
- Searsia tomentosa (L.) F.A.Barkley, indigenous
- Searsia transvaalensis (Engl.) Moffett, indigenous
- Searsia tridactyla (Burch.) Moffett, endemic
  - Searsia tumulicola (S.Moore) Moffett, indigenous
  - Searsia tumulicola (S.Moore) Moffett var. meeuseana (R.Fern. & A.Fern.) Moffett forma meeuseana, indigenous
  - Searsia tumulicola (S.Moore) Moffett var. meeuseana (R.Fern. & A.Fern.) Moffett forma pumila, endemic
  - Searsia tumulicola (S.Moore) Moffett var. tumulicola, indigenous
- Searsia undulata (Jacq.) T.S.Yi, A.J.Mill. & J.Wen, indigenous
- Searsia wilmsii (Diels) Moffett, endemic
- Searsia zeyheri (Sond.) Moffett, endemic

=== Smodingium ===
Genus Smodingium:

- Smodingium argutum E.Mey. ex Sond. endemic

=== Toxicodendron ===
Genus Toxicodendron:

- Toxicodendron succedaneum (L.) Kuntze, not indigenous, cultivated, naturalised, invasive

== Burseraceae ==
- Family: Burseraceae,

=== Commiphora ===
Genus Commiphora:

- Commiphora africana (A.Rich.) Engl. indigenous
  - Commiphora africana (A.Rich.) Engl. var. africana, indigenous
- Commiphora angolensis Engl. indigenous
- Commiphora capensis (Sond.) Engl. indigenous
- Commiphora cervifolia J.J.A.van der Walt, indigenous
- Commiphora edulis (Klotzsch) Engl. indigenous
  - Commiphora edulis (Klotzsch) Engl. subsp. edulis, indigenous
- Commiphora gariepensis Swanepoel, indigenous
- Commiphora glandulosa Schinz, indigenous
- Commiphora gracilifrondosa Dinter ex J.J.A.van der Walt, indigenous
- Commiphora harveyi (Engl.) Engl. indigenous
- Commiphora marlothii Engl. indigenous
- Commiphora merkeri Engl. accepted as Commiphora viminea Burtt Davy, present
- Commiphora mollis (Oliv.) Engl. indigenous
- Commiphora namaensis Schinz, indigenous
- Commiphora neglecta I.Verd. indigenous
- Commiphora pyracanthoides Engl. indigenous
- Commiphora schimperi (O.Berg) Engl. indigenous
- Commiphora tenuipetiolata Engl. indigenous
- Commiphora viminea Burtt Davy, indigenous
- Commiphora woodii Engl. indigenous
- Commiphora zanzibarica (Baill.) Engl. indigenous

== Kirkiaceae ==
- Family: Kirkiaceae,

=== Kirkia ===
Genus Kirkia:

- Kirkia acuminata Oliv. indigenous
- Kirkia wilmsii Engl. indigenous

== Meliaceae ==
- Family: Meliaceae,

=== Cedrela ===
Genus Cedrela:

- Cedrela odorata L. not indigenous, naturalised

=== Chukrasia ===
Genus Chukrasia:

- Chukrasia tabularis A.Juss. not indigenous, cultivated, naturalised

=== Ekebergia ===
Genus Ekebergia:

- Ekebergia capensis Sparrm. indigenous
- Ekebergia pterophylla (C.DC.) Hofmeyr, indigenous

=== Entandrophragma ===
Genus Entandrophragma:

- Entandrophragma caudatum (Sprague) Sprague, indigenous

=== Khaya ===
Genus Khaya:

- Khaya anthotheca (Welw.) C.DC. not indigenous, naturalised

=== Melia ===
Genus Melia:

- Melia azedarach L. not indigenous, naturalised, invasive

=== Nymania ===
Genus Nymania:

- Nymania capensis (Thunb.) Lindb. indigenous

=== Pseudobersama ===
Genus Pseudobersama:

- Pseudobersama mossambicensis (Sim) Verdc. indigenous

=== Toona ===
Genus Toona:

- Toona ciliata M.Roem. not indigenous, naturalised, invasive

=== Trichilia ===
Genus Trichilia:

- Trichilia dregeana Sond. indigenous
- Trichilia emetica Vahl, indigenous
  - Trichilia emetica Vahl subsp. emetica, indigenous

=== Turraea ===
Genus Turraea:

- Turraea floribunda Hochst. indigenous
- Turraea nilotica Kotschy & Peyr. indigenous
- Turraea obtusifolia Hochst. indigenous
- Turraea pulchella (Harms) T.D.Penn. endemic
- Turraea streyi F.White & Styles, endemic

=== Xylocarpus ===
Genus Xylocarpus:

- Xylocarpus granatum J.Konig, indigenous

== Peganaceae ==
- Family: Peganaceae,

=== Peganum ===
Genus Peganum:

- Peganum harmala L. not indigenous, naturalised

== Rutaceae ==
- Family: Rutaceae,

=== Acmadenia ===
Genus Acmadenia:

- Acmadenia alternifolia Cham. endemic
- Acmadenia argillophila I.Williams, endemic
- Acmadenia baileyensis I.Williams, endemic
- Acmadenia bodkinii (Schltr.) Strid, endemic
- Acmadenia burchellii Dummer, endemic
- Acmadenia candida I.Williams, endemic
- Acmadenia densifolia Sond. endemic
- Acmadenia faucitincta I.Williams, endemic
- Acmadenia flaccida Eckl. & Zeyh. endemic
- Acmadenia fruticosa I.Williams, endemic
- Acmadenia gracilis Dummer, endemic
- Acmadenia heterophylla P.E.Glover, endemic
- Acmadenia kiwanensis I.Williams, endemic
- Acmadenia latifolia I.Williams, endemic
- Acmadenia laxa I.Williams, endemic
- Acmadenia macradenia (Sond.) Dummer, endemic
- Acmadenia macropetala (P.E.Glover) Compton, endemic
- Acmadenia maculata I.Williams, endemic
- Acmadenia matroosbergensis E.Phillips, endemic
- Acmadenia mundiana Eckl. & Zeyh. endemic
- Acmadenia nivea I.Williams, endemic
- Acmadenia nivenii Sond. endemic
- Acmadenia obtusata (Thunb.) Bartl. & H.L.Wendl. endemic
  - Acmadenia obtusata (Thunb.) Bartl. & H.L.Wendl. var. macropetala Glover, accepted as Acmadenia macropetala (P.E.Glover) Compton, present
- Acmadenia patentifolia I.Williams, endemic
- Acmadenia rourkeana I.Williams, endemic
- Acmadenia rupicola I.Williams, endemic
- Acmadenia sheilae I.Williams, endemic
- Acmadenia tenax I.Williams, endemic
- Acmadenia teretifolia (Link) E.Phillips, endemic
- Acmadenia tetracarpellata I.Williams, endemic
- Acmadenia tetragona (L.f.) Bartl. & H.L.Wendl. endemic
- Acmadenia trigona (Eckl. & Zeyh.) Druce, endemic
- Acmadenia wittebergensis (Compton) I.Williams, endemic

=== Adenandra ===
Genus Adenandra:

- Adenandra acuta Schltr. endemic
- Adenandra brachyphylla Schltdl. endemic
- Adenandra coriacea Licht. ex Roem. & Schult. endemic
- Adenandra dahlgrenii Strid, endemic
- Adenandra fragrans (Sims) Roem. & Schult. endemic
- Adenandra gracilis Eckl. & Zeyh. endemic
- Adenandra gummifera Strid, endemic
- Adenandra lasiantha Sond. endemic
- Adenandra marginata (L.f.) Roem. & Schult. endemic
  - Adenandra marginata (L.f.) Roem. & Schult. subsp. humilis (Eckl. & Zeyh.) Strid, accepted as Adenandra humilis Eckl. & Zeyh. endemic
- Adenandra marginata (L.f.) Roem. & Schult. subsp. marginata, endemic
  - Adenandra marginata (L.f.) Roem. & Schult. subsp. mucronata Strid, endemic
  - Adenandra marginata (L.f.) Roem. & Schult. subsp. serpyllacea (Bartl.) Strid, endemic
- Adenandra multiflora Strid, endemic
- Adenandra mundiifolia Eckl. & Zeyh. endemic
- Adenandra obtusata Sond. endemic
- Adenandra odoratissima Strid, endemic
  - Adenandra odoratissima Strid subsp. odoratissima, endemic
  - Adenandra odoratissima Strid subsp. tenuis Strid, endemic
- Adenandra rotundifolia Eckl. & Zeyh. endemic
- Adenandra schlechteri Dummer, endemic
- Adenandra uniflora (L.) Willd. endemic
- Adenandra villosa (P.J.Bergius) Licht. ex Roem. & Schult. endemic
  - Adenandra villosa (P.J.Bergius) Licht. ex Roem. & Schult. subsp. apiculata Strid, endemic
  - Adenandra villosa (P.J.Bergius) Licht. ex Roem. & Schult. subsp. biseriata (E.Mey. ex Bartl. & H.L.W, endemic
  - Adenandra villosa (P.J.Bergius) Licht. ex Roem. & Schult. subsp. imbricata Strid, endemic
  - Adenandra villosa (P.J.Bergius) Licht. ex Roem. & Schult. subsp. orbicularis Strid, endemic
  - Adenandra villosa (P.J.Bergius) Licht. ex Roem. & Schult. subsp. pedicellata Strid, endemic
  - Adenandra villosa (P.J.Bergius) Licht. ex Roem. & Schult. subsp. robusta Strid, endemic
  - Adenandra villosa (P.J.Bergius) Licht. ex Roem. & Schult. subsp. sonderi (Dummer) Strid, endemic
  - Adenandra villosa (P.J.Bergius) Licht. ex Roem. & Schult. subsp. umbellata (J.C.Wendl.) Strid, endemic
  - Adenandra villosa (P.J.Bergius) Licht. ex Roem. & Schult. subsp. villosa, endemic
- Adenandra viscidia Eckl. & Zeyh. endemic

=== Agathosma ===
Genus Agathosma:

- Agathosma abrupta Pillans, endemic
- Agathosma acocksii Pillans, endemic
- Agathosma acutissima Dummer, endemic
- Agathosma adenandriflora Schltr. endemic
- Agathosma adnata Pillans, endemic
- Agathosma aemula Schltr. endemic
- Agathosma affinis Sond. endemic
- Agathosma alaris Cham. endemic
- Agathosma alligans I.Williams, endemic
- Agathosma alpina Schltr. endemic
- Agathosma alticola Schltr. ex Dummer, endemic
- Agathosma anomala E.Mey. ex Sond. endemic
- Agathosma apiculata G.Mey. endemic
- Agathosma asperifolia Eckl. & Zeyh. endemic
- Agathosma barnesiae Compton, endemic
- Agathosma bathii (Dummer) Pillans, endemic
- Agathosma betulina (P.J.Bergius) Pillans, endemic
- Agathosma bicolor Dummer, endemic
- Agathosma bicornuta R.A.Dyer, endemic
- Agathosma bifida (Jacq.) Bartl. & H.L.Wendl. endemic
- Agathosma bisulca (Thunb.) Bartl. & H.L.Wendl. endemic
- Agathosma blaerioides Cham. endemic
- Agathosma bodkinii Dummer, endemic
- Agathosma capensis (L.) Dummer, endemic
- Agathosma capitata Sond. endemic
- Agathosma cedrimontana Dummer, endemic
- Agathosma cephalodes E.Mey. ex Sond. endemic
- Agathosma cerefolium (Vent.) Bartl. & H.L.Wendl. endemic
- Agathosma ciliaris (L.) Druce, endemic
- Agathosma ciliata (L.) Link, endemic
- Agathosma clavisepala R.A.Dyer, endemic
- Agathosma collina Eckl. & Zeyh. endemic
- Agathosma concava Pillans, endemic
- Agathosma conferta Pillans, endemic
- Agathosma cordifolia Pillans, endemic
- Agathosma corymbosa (Montin) G.Don, endemic
- Agathosma craspedota Sond. endemic
- Agathosma crassifolia Sond. endemic
- Agathosma crenulata (L.) Pillans, endemic
- Agathosma decurrens Pillans, endemic
- Agathosma dentata Pillans, endemic
- Agathosma dielsiana Schltr. ex Dummer, endemic
- Agathosma distans Pillans, endemic
- Agathosma divaricata Pillans, endemic
- Agathosma dregeana Sond. endemic
- Agathosma elata Sond. endemic
- Agathosma elegans Cham. endemic
- Agathosma eriantha (Steud.) Steud. endemic
- Agathosma esterhuyseniae Pillans, endemic
- Agathosma florida Sond. endemic
- Agathosma florulenta Sond. endemic
- Agathosma foetidissima (Bartl. & H.L.Wendl.) Steud. endemic
- Agathosma foleyana Dummer, endemic
- Agathosma fraudulenta Sond. endemic
- Agathosma geniculata Pillans, endemic
- Agathosma giftbergensis E.Phillips, endemic
- Agathosma glabrata Bartl. & H.L.Wendl. endemic
- Agathosma glandulosa (Thunb.) Sond. endemic
- Agathosma gnidiiflora Dummer, endemic
- Agathosma gonaquensis Eckl. & Zeyh. endemic
- Agathosma hirsuta Pillans, endemic
- Agathosma hirta (Lam.) Bartl. & H.L.Wendl. endemic
- Agathosma hispida (Thunb.) Bartl. & H.L.Wendl. endemic
- Agathosma hookeri Sond. endemic
- Agathosma humilis Sond. endemic
- Agathosma imbricata (L.) Willd. endemic
- Agathosma insignis (Compton) Pillans, endemic
- Agathosma involucrata Eckl. & Zeyh. endemic
- Agathosma joubertiana Schltdl. endemic
- Agathosma juniperifolia Bartl. endemic
- Agathosma kougaense Pillans, endemic
- Agathosma krakadouwensis Dummer, endemic
- Agathosma lanceolata (L.) Engl. endemic
- Agathosma lancifolia Eckl. & Zeyh. endemic
- Agathosma latipetala Sond. endemic
- Agathosma leptospermoides Sond. endemic
- Agathosma linifolia (Roem. & Schult.) Licht. ex Bartl. & H.L.Wendl. endemic
- Agathosma longicornu Pillans, endemic
- Agathosma marifolia Eckl. & Zeyh. endemic
- Agathosma marlothii Dummer, endemic
- Agathosma martiana Sond. endemic
- Agathosma microcalyx Dummer, endemic
- Agathosma microcarpa (Sond.) Pillans, endemic
- Agathosma minuta Schltdl. endemic
- Agathosma mirabilis Pillans, endemic
- Agathosma mucronulata Sond. endemic
- Agathosma muirii E.Phillips, endemic
- Agathosma mundtii Cham. & Schltdl. endemic
- Agathosma namaquensis Pillans, endemic
- Agathosma odoratissima (Montin) Pillans, endemic
- Agathosma orbicularis (Thunb.) Bartl. & H.L.Wendl. endemic
- Agathosma ovalifolia Pillans, endemic
- Agathosma ovata (Thunb.) Pillans, indigenous
- Agathosma pallens Pillans, endemic
- Agathosma pattisoniae Dummer, endemic
- Agathosma peglerae Dummer, endemic
- Agathosma pentachotoma E.Mey. ex Sond. endemic
- Agathosma phillipsii Dummer, endemic
- Agathosma pilifera Schltdl. endemic
- Agathosma planifolia Sond. endemic
- Agathosma propinqua Sond. endemic
- Agathosma puberula (Steud.) Fourc. endemic
- Agathosma pubigera Sond. endemic
- Agathosma pulchella (L.) Link, endemic
- Agathosma pungens (E.Mey. ex Sond.) Pillans, endemic
- Agathosma purpurea Pillans, endemic
- Agathosma recurvifolia Sond. endemic
- Agathosma rehmanniana Dummer, endemic
- Agathosma riversdalensis Dummer, endemic
- Agathosma robusta Eckl. & Zeyh. endemic
- Agathosma roodebergensis Compton, endemic
- Agathosma rosmarinifolia (Bartl.) I.Williams, endemic
- Agathosma rubricaulis Dummer, endemic
- Agathosma rudolphii I.Williams, endemic
- Agathosma sabulosa Sond. endemic
- Agathosma salina Eckl. & Zeyh. endemic
- Agathosma scaberula Dummer, endemic
- Agathosma sedifolia Schltdl. endemic
- Agathosma serpyllacea Licht. ex Roem. & Schult. endemic
- Agathosma serratifolia (Curtis) Spreeth, endemic
- Agathosma sladeniana R.Glover, endemic
- Agathosma spinescens Dummer, endemic
- Agathosma spinosa Sond. endemic
- Agathosma squamosa (Roem. & Schult.) Bartl. & H.L.Wendl. endemic
- Agathosma stenopetala (Steud.) Steud. endemic
- Agathosma stenosepala Pillans, endemic
- Agathosma stilbeoides Dummer, endemic
- Agathosma stipitata Pillans, endemic
- Agathosma stokoei Pillans, endemic
- Agathosma subteretifolia Pillans, endemic
- Agathosma tabularis Sond. endemic
- Agathosma thymifolia Schltdl. endemic
- Agathosma trichocarpa Holmes, endemic
- Agathosma tulbaghensis Dummer, endemic
- Agathosma umbonata Pillans, endemic
- Agathosma unicarpellata (Fourc.) Pillans, endemic
- Agathosma venusta (Eckl. & Zeyh.) Pillans, endemic
- Agathosma virgata (Lam.) Bartl. & H.L.Wendl. endemic
- Agathosma zwartbergense Pillans, endemic

=== Calodendrum ===
Genus Calodendrum:

- Calodendrum capense (L.f.) Thunb. indigenous

=== Clausena ===
Genus Clausena:

- Clausena anisata (Willd.) Hook.f. ex Benth. indigenous
  - Clausena anisata (Willd.) Hook.f. ex Benth. subsp. abyssinica (Engl.) Cufod. accepted as Clausena anisata (Willd.) Hook.f. ex Benth. var. anisata
  - Clausena anisata (Willd.) Hook.f. ex Benth. var. anisata, indigenous

=== Coleonema ===
Genus Coleonema:

- Coleonema album (Thunb.) Bartl. & H.L.Wendl. endemic
- Coleonema aspalathoides Juss. ex G.Don, endemic
- Coleonema calycinum (Steud.) I.Williams, endemic
- Coleonema juniperinum Sond. endemic
- Coleonema nubigenum Esterh. endemic
- Coleonema pulchellum I.Williams, endemic
- Coleonema pulchrum Hook. endemic
- Coleonema virgatum (Schltdl.) Eckl. & Zeyh. endemic

=== Diosma ===
Genus Diosma:

- Diosma acmaeophylla Eckl. & Zeyh. endemic
- Diosma apetala (Dummer) I.Williams, endemic
- Diosma arenicola I.Williams, endemic
- Diosma aristata I.Williams, endemic
- Diosma aspalathoides Lam. endemic
- Diosma awilana I.Williams, endemic
- Diosma capitata L. accepted as Audouinia capitata (L.) Brongn. indigenous
- Diosma cuspidata Thunb. accepted as Linconia cuspidata (Thunb.) Sw. indigenous
- Diosma demissa I.Williams, endemic
- Diosma deusta Thunb. accepted as Linconia cuspidata (Thunb.) Sw. indigenous
- Diosma dichotoma P.J.Bergius, endemic
- Diosma echinulata I.Williams, endemic
- Diosma fallax I.Williams, endemic
- Diosma guthriei P.E.Glover, endemic
- Diosma haelkraalensis I.Williams, endemic
- Diosma hirsuta L. endemic
- Diosma meyeriana Spreng. endemic
- Diosma oppositifolia L. endemic
- Diosma parvula I.Williams, endemic
- Diosma passerinoides Steud. endemic
- Diosma pedicellata I.Williams, endemic
- Diosma pilosa I.Williams, endemic
- Diosma prama I.Williams, endemic
- Diosma ramosissima Bartl. & H.L.Wendl. endemic
- Diosma recurva Cham. endemic
- Diosma rourkei I.Williams, endemic
- Diosma sabulosa I.Williams, endemic
- Diosma strumosa I.Williams, endemic
- Diosma subulata J.C.Wendl. endemic
- Diosma tenella I.Williams, endemic
- Diosma thyrsophora Eckl. & Zeyh. endemic
- Diosma ustulata Thunb. accepted as Thamnea unstulata (Thunb.) A.V.Hall, endemic

=== Empleurum ===
Genus Empleurum:

- Empleurum fragrans P.E.Glover, endemic
- Empleurum unicapsulare (L.f.) Skeels, endemic

=== Euchaetis ===
Genus Euchaetis:

- Euchaetis albertiniana I.Williams, endemic
- Euchaetis avisylvana I.Williams, endemic
- Euchaetis burchellii Dummer, endemic
- Euchaetis cristagalli I.Williams, endemic
- Euchaetis diosmoides (Schltr.) I.Williams, endemic
- Euchaetis elata Eckl. & Zeyh. endemic
- Euchaetis elsieae I.Williams, endemic
- Euchaetis ericoides Dummer, endemic
- Euchaetis esterhuyseniae I.Williams, endemic
- Euchaetis flexilis Eckl. & Zeyh. endemic
- Euchaetis glabra I.Williams, endemic
- Euchaetis glomerata Bartl. & H.L.Wendl. endemic
- Euchaetis intonsa I.Williams, endemic
- Euchaetis laevigata Turcz. endemic
- Euchaetis linearis Sond. endemic
- Euchaetis longibracteata Schltr. endemic
- Euchaetis longicornis I.Williams, endemic
- Euchaetis meridionalis I.Williams, endemic
- Euchaetis pungens (Bartl. & H.L.Wendl.) I.Williams, endemic
- Euchaetis scabricosta I.Williams, endemic
- Euchaetis schlechteri Schinz, endemic
- Euchaetis tricarpellata I.Williams, endemic
- Euchaetis vallis-simiae I.Williams, endemic

=== Macrostylis ===
Genus Macrostylis:

- Macrostylis barbigera (L.f.) Bartl. & H.L.Wendl. endemic
- Macrostylis cassiopoides (Turcz.) I.Williams, indigenous
  - Macrostylis cassiopoides (Turcz.) I.Williams subsp. cassiopoides, endemic
  - Macrostylis cassiopoides (Turcz.) I.Williams subsp. dregeana (Sond.) I.Williams, endemic
- Macrostylis cauliflora I.Williams, endemic
- Macrostylis crassifolia Sond. endemic
- Macrostylis decipiens E.Mey. ex Sond. endemic
- Macrostylis hirta E.Mey. ex Sond. endemic
- Macrostylis ramulosa I.Williams, endemic
- Macrostylis squarrosa Bartl. & H.L.Wendl. endemic
- Macrostylis tenuis E.Mey. ex Sond. endemic
- Macrostylis villosa (Thunb.) Sond. indigenous
  - Macrostylis villosa (Thunb.) Sond. subsp. minor I.Williams, endemic
  - Macrostylis villosa (Thunb.) Sond. subsp. villosa, endemic

=== Murraya ===
Genus Murraya:

- Murraya paniculata (L.) Jack, not indigenous, cultivated, naturalised, invasive
  - Murraya paniculata (L.) Jack var. paniculata, not indigenous, cultivated, naturalised, invasive

=== Oricia ===
Genus Oricia – synonym of Vepris

- Oricia bachmannii (Engl.) I.Verd. accepted as Vepris bachmannii (Engl.) Mziray, indigenous
- Oricia swynnertonii (Baker f.) I.Verd. accepted as Vepris bachmannii (Engl.) Mziray, indigenous
- Oricia transvaalensis I.Verd. accepted as Vepris bachmannii (Engl.) Mziray, present

=== Phyllosma ===
Genus Phyllosma:

- Phyllosma barosmoides (Dummer) I.Williams, endemic
- Phyllosma capensis Bolus, endemic

=== Ptaeroxylon ===
Genus Ptaeroxylon:

- Ptaeroxylon obliquum (Thunb.) Radlk. indigenous

=== Ruta ===
Genus Ruta:

- Ruta graveolens L. not indigenous, naturalised

=== Sheilanthera ===
Genus Sheilanthera:

- Sheilanthera pubens I.Williams, endemic

=== Teclea ===
Genus Teclea – synonym of Vepris

- Teclea bachmannii Engl. accepted as Vepris bachmannii (Engl.) Mziray, indigenous
- Teclea gerrardii I.Verd. accepted as Vepris trichocarpa (Engl.) Mziray, indigenous
- Teclea natalensis (Sond.) Engl. accepted as Vepris natalensis (Sond.) Mziray, indigenous
- Teclea pilosa (Engl.) I.Verd. accepted as Vepris carringtoniana MendonÃ§a, indigenous
- Teclea swynnertonii Baker f. accepted as Vepris bachmannii (Engl.) Mziray, indigenous

=== Thamnosma ===
Genus Thamnosma:

- Thamnosma africana Engl. indigenous

=== Toddalia ===
Genus Toddalia:

- Toddalia asiatica (L.) Lam. indigenous
- Toddalia natalensis Sond. accepted as Vepris natalensis (Sond.) Mziray, indigenous

=== Toddaliopsis ===
Genus Toddaliopsis – synonym of Vepris

- Toddaliopsis bremekampii I.Verd. accepted as Vepris bremekampii (I.Verd.) Mziray, indigenous

=== Vepris ===
Genus Vepris:

- Vepris bachmannii (Engl.) Mziray, indigenous
- Vepris bremekampii (I.Verd.) Mziray, indigenous
- Vepris carringtoniana MendonÃ§a, indigenous
- Vepris lanceolata (Lam.) G.Don, indigenous
- Vepris natalensis (Sond.) Mziray, indigenous
- Vepris reflexa I.Verd. indigenous
- Vepris trichocarpa (Engl.) Mziray, indigenous

=== Zanthoxylum ===
Genus Zanthoxylum:

- Zanthoxylum capense (Thunb.) Harv. indigenous
- Zanthoxylum davyi (I.Verd.) P.G.Waterman, indigenous
- Zanthoxylum humile (E.A.Bruce) P.G.Waterman, indigenous
- Zanthoxylum leprieurii Guill. & Perr. indigenous
- Zanthoxylum thorncroftii (I.Verd.) P.G.Waterman, endemic

== Sapindaceae ==
- Family: Sapindaceae,

=== Acer ===
Genus Acer:

- Acer buergerianum Miq. not indigenous, naturalised, invasive
- Acer negundo L. not indigenous, naturalised, invasive

=== Allophylus ===
Genus Allophylus:

- Allophylus africanus P.Beauv. indigenous
  - Allophylus africanus P.Beauv. var. africanus, indigenous
- Allophylus chaunostachys Gilg, indigenous
- Allophylus decipiens (Sond.) Radlk. indigenous
- Allophylus dregeanus (Sond.) De Winter, endemic
- Allophylus melanocarpus (Sond.) Radlk. accepted as Allophylus africanus P.Beauv. var. africanus, present
- Allophylus natalensis (Sond.) De Winter, indigenous
- Allophylus rubifolius (Hochst. ex A.Rich.) Engl. indigenous
  - Allophylus rubifolius (Hochst. ex A.Rich.) Engl. var. rubifolius, indigenous
- Allophylus transvaalensis Burtt Davy, accepted as Allophylus africanus P.Beauv. var. africanus, present

=== Atalaya ===
Genus Atalaya:

- Atalaya alata (Sim) H.M.L.Forbes, indigenous
- Atalaya capensis R.A.Dyer, endemic
- Atalaya natalensis R.A.Dyer, endemic

=== Blighia ===
Genus Blighia:

- Blighia unijugata Baker, indigenous
- Blighia zambesiaca Baker, accepted as Blighia unijugata Baker, present

=== Cardiospermum ===
Genus Cardiospermum:

- Cardiospermum corindum L. indigenous
- Cardiospermum grandiflorum Sw. not indigenous, naturalised, invasive
  - Cardiospermum grandiflorum Sw. forma hirsutum (Willd.) Radlk. accepted as Cardiospermum grandiflorum Sw. present
- Cardiospermum halicacabum L. not indigenous, naturalised, invasive
  - Cardiospermum halicacabum L. var. halicacabum, indigenous
  - Cardiospermum halicacabum L. var. microcarpum (Kunth) Blume, indigenous

=== Deinbollia ===
Genus Deinbollia:

- Deinbollia oblongifolia (E.Mey. ex Arn.) Radlk. indigenous
- Deinbollia xanthocarpa (Klotzsch) Radlk. indigenous

=== Dodonaea ===
Genus Dodonaea:

- Dodonaea viscosa Jacq. indigenous
  - Dodonaea viscosa subsp. angustifolia (L.f.) J.G.West present
  - Dodonaea viscosa Jacq. var. angustifolia (L.f.) Benth. indigenous
  - Dodonaea viscosa Jacq. var. viscosa, indigenous

=== Erythrophysa ===
Genus Erythrophysa:

- Erythrophysa alata (Eckl. & Zeyh.) Hutch. indigenous
- Erythrophysa transvaalensis I.Verd. indigenous

=== Haplocoelum ===
Genus Haplocoelum:

- Haplocoelum foliolosum (Hiern) Bullock, indigenous
  - Haplocoelum foliolosum (Hiern) Bullock subsp. mombasense (Bullock) Verdc. indigenous
- Haplocoelum gallaense (Engl.) Radlk. accepted as Haplocoelum foliolosum (Hiern) Bullock subsp. mombasense (Bullock) Verdc. present

=== Hippobromus ===
Genus Hippobromus:

- Hippobromus pauciflorus (L.f.) Radlk. indigenous

=== Pancovia ===
Genus Pancovia:

- Pancovia golungensis (Hiern) Exell & MendonÃ§a, indigenous

=== Pappea ===
Genus Pappea:

- Pappea capensis Eckl. & Zeyh. indigenous

=== Paullinia ===
Genus Paullinia:

- Paullinia asiatica L. accepted as Toddalia asiatica (L.) Lam.

=== Smelophyllum ===
Genus Smelophyllum:

- Smelophyllum capense (Sond.) Radlk. indigenous

=== Stadmannia ===
Genus Stadmannia:

- Stadmannia oppositifolia Lam. indigenous
  - Stadmannia oppositifolia Lam. subsp. rhodesica Exell, indigenous

== Simaroubaceae ==
- Family: Simaroubaceae,

=== Ailanthus ===
Genus Ailanthus:

- Ailanthus altissima (Mill.) Swingle, not indigenous, naturalised, invasive
