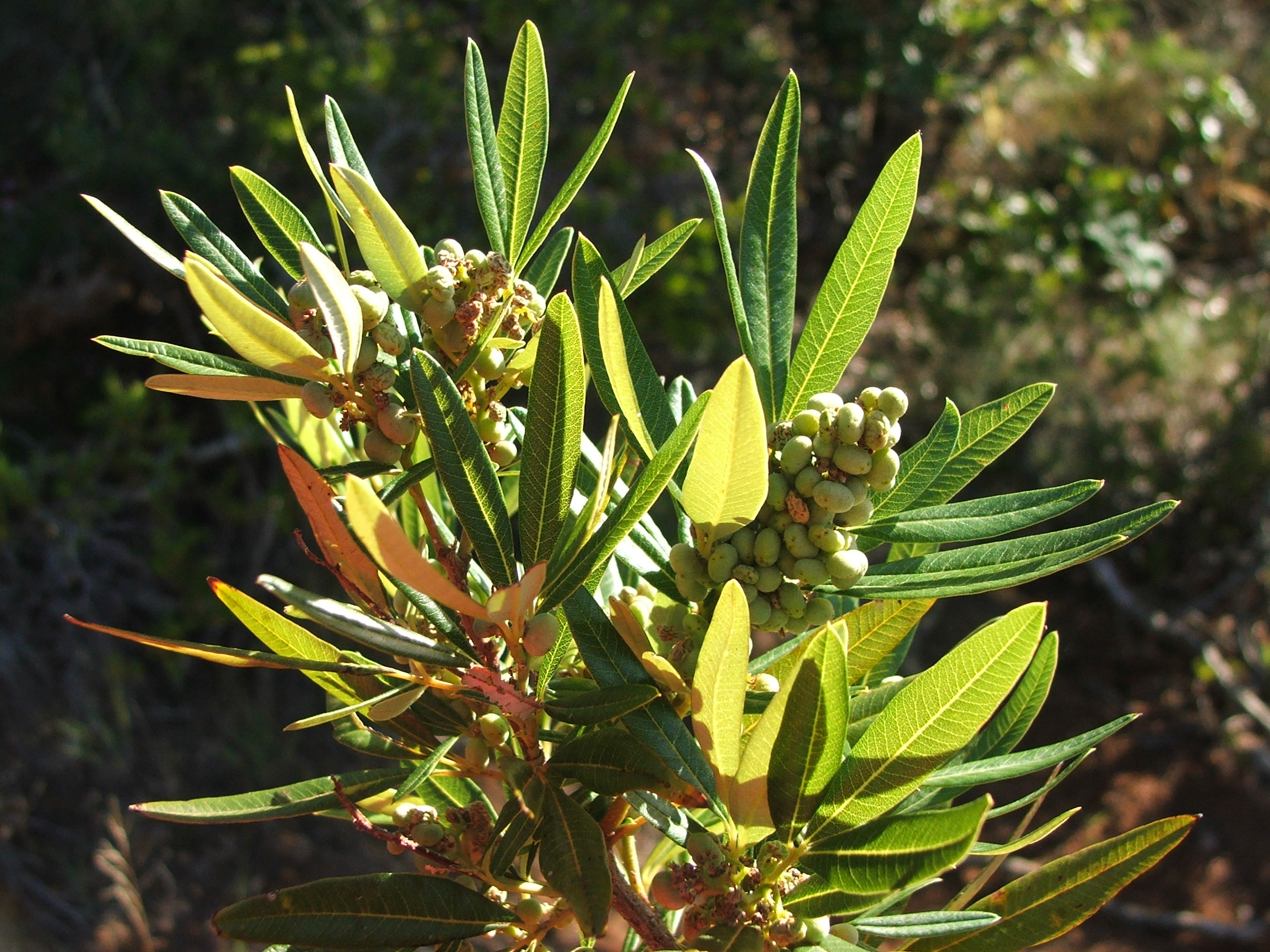

Conservation status
- Least Concern (IUCN 3.1)

Scientific classification
- Kingdom: Plantae
- Clade: Tracheophytes
- Clade: Angiosperms
- Clade: Eudicots
- Clade: Rosids
- Order: Sapindales
- Family: Anacardiaceae
- Genus: Searsia
- Species: S. angustifolia

Binomial name
- Searsia angustifolia (L.) F.A.Barkley

Synonyms
- Rhus angustifolia L.

= Searsia angustifolia =

Species of tree

Searsia angustifolia, the willow karee or smalblaar, is a small, bushy, evergreen tree which is confined to the South Western Cape in South Africa.

== Description ==
The multi-stemmed willow karee bush grows to a height of about 4 meters (13 ft). It has trifoliate leaves with dark green surfaces and grey furry undersides.

The leaflets are each lanceolate to narrowly elliptical.

Its flowers appear in Spring. They are small and cream coloured. The female plants produce clumps of tiny berries.

== Distribution and habitat ==
This species is indigenous to the Western Cape Province, South Africa.

Its range extends from Cape Town in the west, eastwards to the Caledon and Swellendam regions. In the north, it occurs in the Malmesbury, Worcester, Hex river and Cedarberg regions.

It grows on low hill slopes and dense thickets of it can be found growing alongside rivers and roads.
