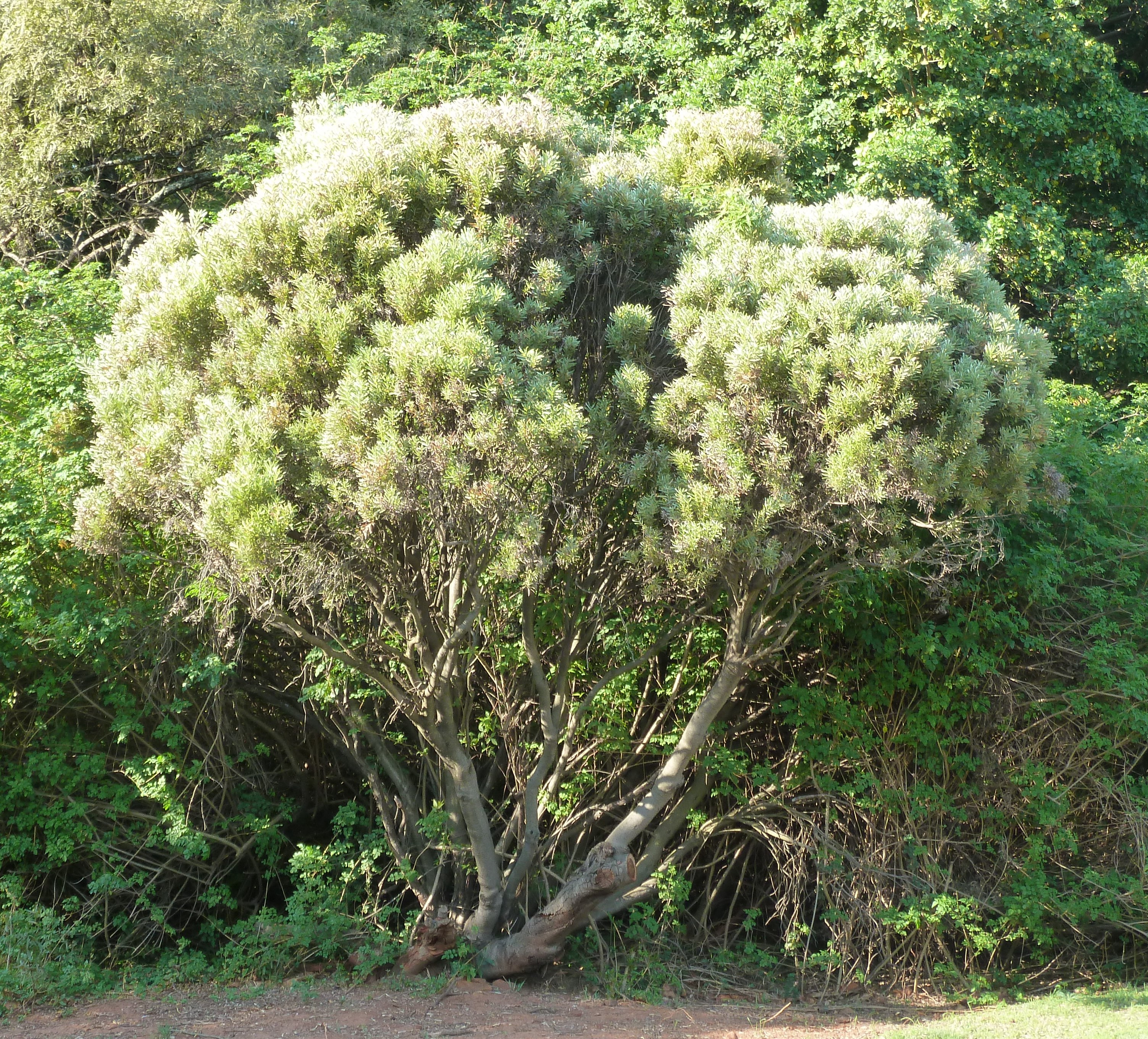

Conservation status
- Least Concern (IUCN 3.1)

Scientific classification
- Kingdom: Plantae
- Clade: Tracheophytes
- Clade: Angiosperms
- Clade: Eudicots
- Clade: Rosids
- Order: Sapindales
- Family: Anacardiaceae
- Genus: Loxostylis; Spreng. ex Rchb.
- Species: L. alata

Binomial name
- Loxostylis alata Spreng. ex Rchb.

Synonyms
- Anasyllis angustifolia E.Mey.; Anasyllis latifolia E.Mey.; Loxostylis latifolia C.Presl; Rhus calycina Steud.

= Loxostylis =

Genus of plants

Loxostylis is a genus of flowering plants belonging to the family Anacardiaceae.

The genus contains a single species called Loxostylis alata. In English, this species goes by the common name tar wood. It has self supporting growth and is perennial.

The IUCN lists the species as least concern due to it being a widespread species. But it’s being harmed in certain areas. Its native range is Southern Africa.

== Name and etymology ==
Loxostylis is derived from the Greek word loxos and the Latin stylis. Loxos means “crooked”, “oblique”, or “twisted” while stylis means “style”. While alatus is Latin for “winged”.

== Occurrence ==
It is native to Cape Provinces and KwaZulu-Natal.

Loxostylis alata is found along woodland edges, along rivers, and on the outcrops of quartz and sandstone.

== Reproduction ==
It is dioecious. In spring, male flowers are white and scented while the female flowers are green but the sepals turn red or pink.
