= Searsia gerrardii =

Scientific classification
- Kingdom: Plantae
- Clade: Tracheophytes
- Clade: Angiosperms
- Clade: Eudicots
- Clade: Rosids
- Order: Sapindales
- Family: Anacardiaceae
- Genus: Searsia
- Species: S. gerardii

Binomial name
- Searsia gerardii (Engl.) Moffett

Synonyms
- Rhus gerrardii (Engl.) Harv. ex Diels; Rhus viminalis var. gerrardii Engl. Rhus denudata Eckl. & Zeyh. Rhus elongata Eckl. & Zeyh. Rhus viminalis Aiton; Rhus wildingii Dehnh. Toxicodendron viminale (Aiton) Kuntze

Species of tree

Searsia gerrardii, the Drakensberg karee, is a deciduous, drought resistant tree, native to South Africa. It reaches a height of up to 5 metres. It is frost hardy and occurs naturally in mountain areas, often along riverbanks. The tree has a graceful drooping habit. It produces small yellowish flowers which, on female trees, turn into small fruits which are relished by birds. This tree makes a lovely shade tree for a small garden.
