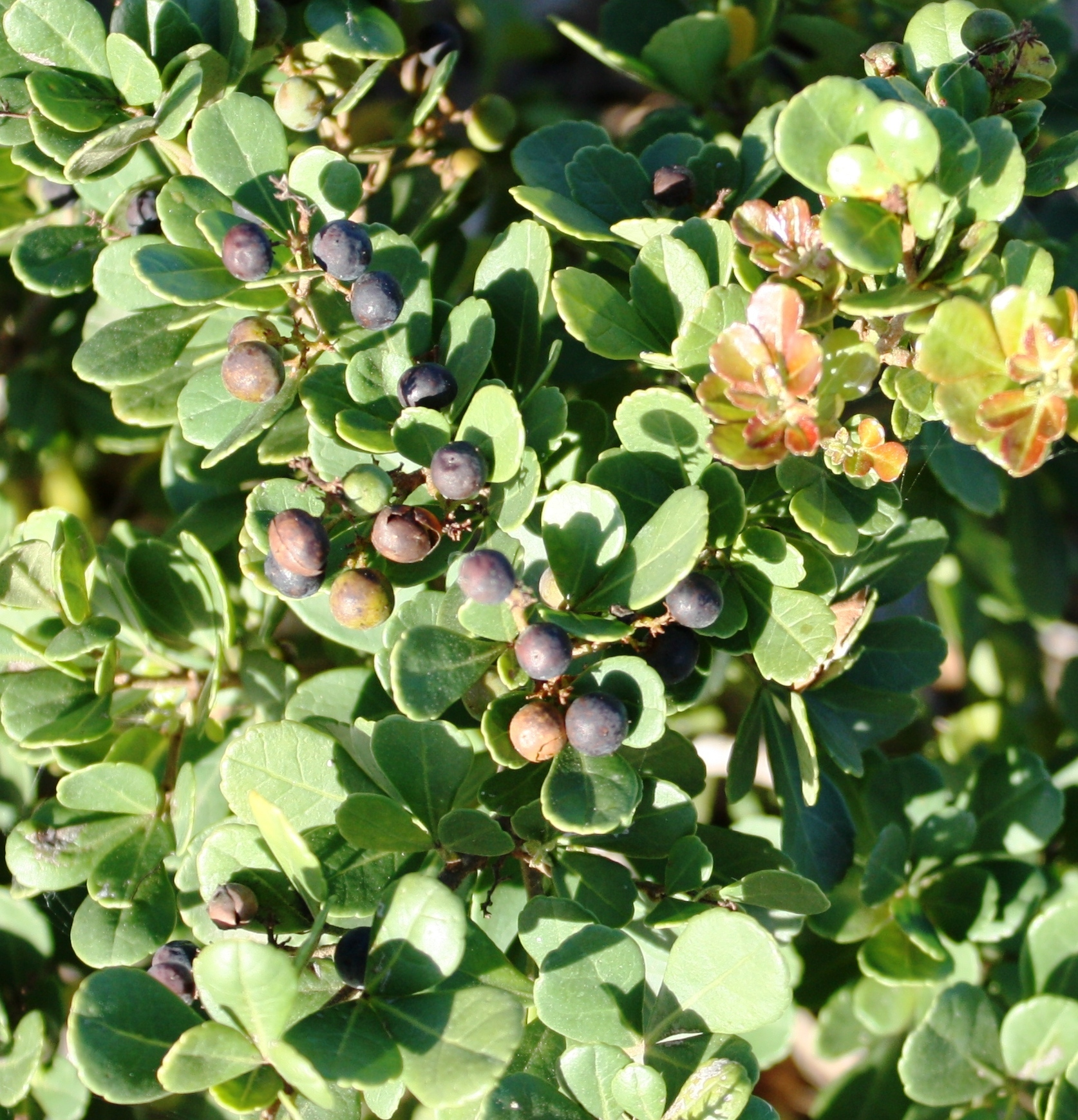

Scientific classification
- Kingdom: Plantae
- Clade: Tracheophytes
- Clade: Angiosperms
- Clade: Eudicots
- Clade: Rosids
- Order: Sapindales
- Family: Anacardiaceae
- Genus: Searsia
- Species: S. crenata

Binomial name
- Searsia crenata (Thunb.) Moffett

Synonyms
- Rhus crenata Thunb.

= Searsia crenata =

Species of tree

Searsia crenata, previously known as Rhus crenata, ("dune crow-berry"), is a species of Searsia that is native to South Africa, where it grows in frost-free and light frost areas, especially on beach sand dunes.

== Description ==
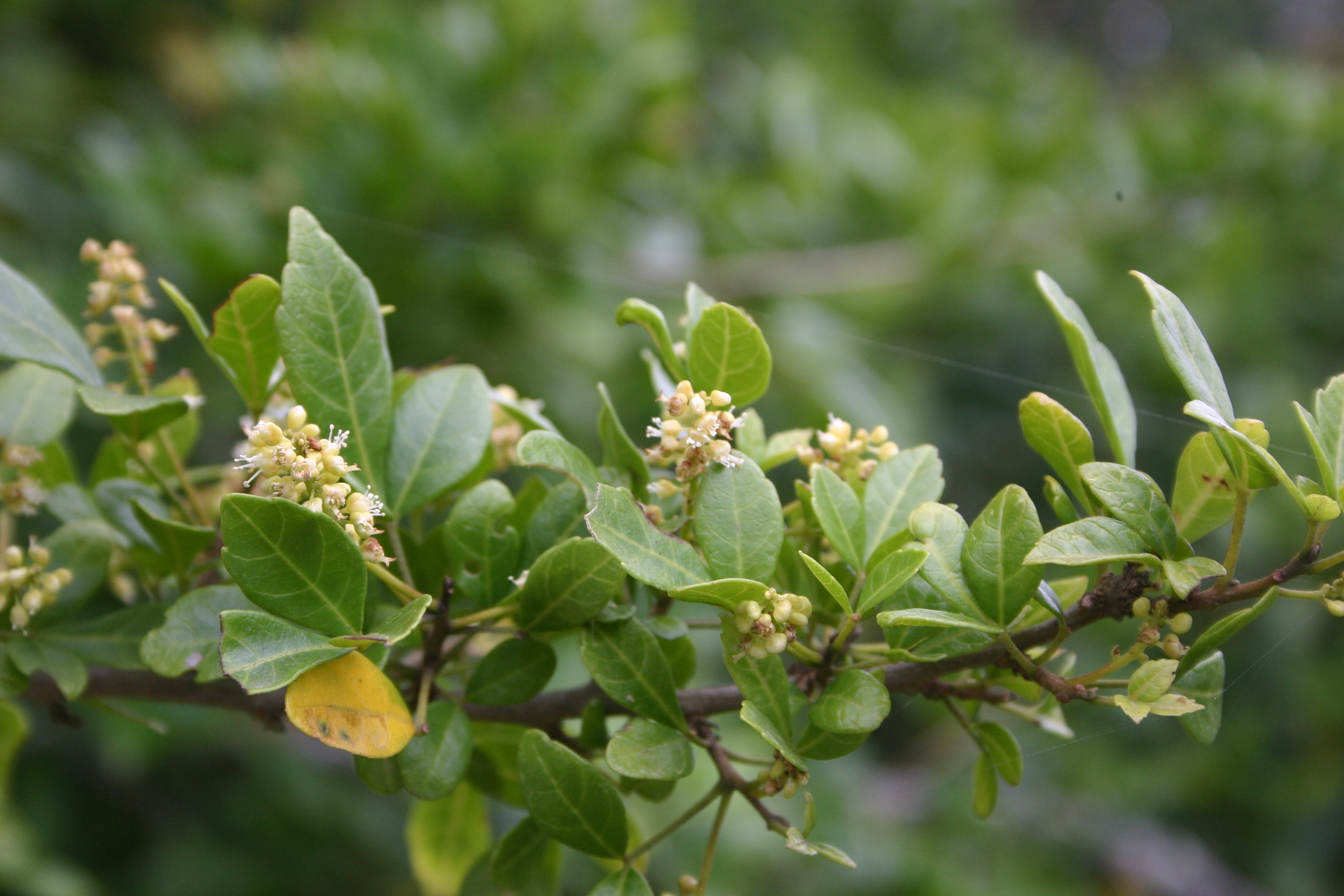
Detail of flowers of the dune crow-berry.

It is a multibranched evergreen shrub or small tree, reaching a height of 3 metres and a similar spread.

The leaf stalks (petioles) are about 2 mm in length. Each leaflet is obovate-cuneate with three distinct bumps at the broad tip (tricrenate).

The small flowers are produced in autumn, and are followed by dark blue fruit eaten by birds.

== Distribution ==
This species is found along the southern coast of South Africa, from Cape Town as far east as the Kei river. Its favoured habitat is stabilised sand dunes.

== Cultivation ==
The tree is a good subject for bonsai, and can easily be pruned into a very neat hedge. It enjoys full sun and is semi frost hardy.
