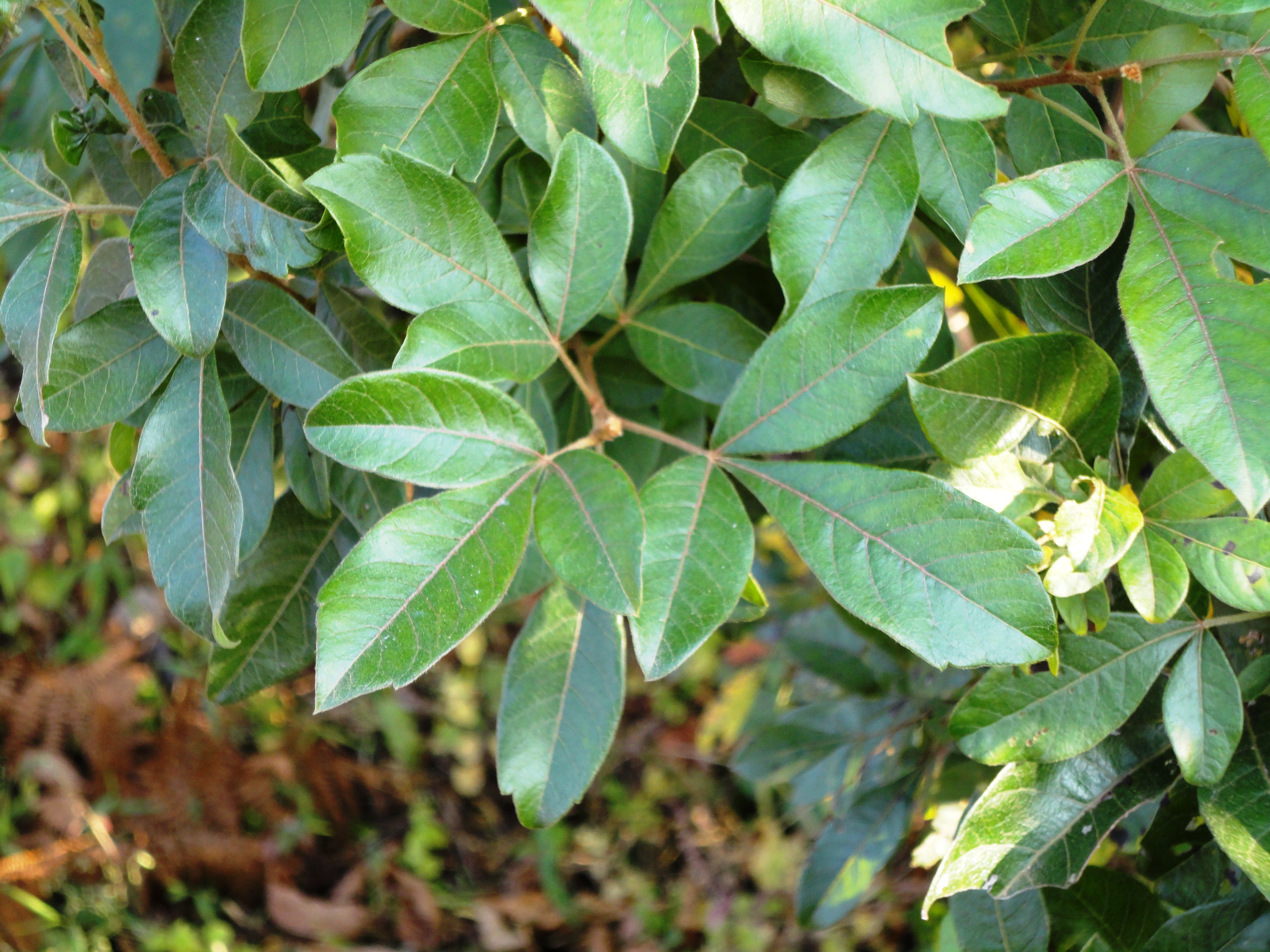

Scientific classification
- Kingdom: Plantae
- Clade: Tracheophytes
- Clade: Angiosperms
- Clade: Eudicots
- Clade: Rosids
- Order: Sapindales
- Family: Anacardiaceae
- Genus: Searsia
- Species: S. pyroides

Binomial name
- Searsia pyroides (Burch.) Moffett

Synonyms
- Rhus pyroides Burch.; Rhus vulgaris Meikle

= Searsia pyroides =

Species of tree

Searsia pyroides, previously known as Rhus pyroides, (common currant-rhus English, gewone taaibos Afrikaans, nhlokoshiyane isiZulu) is a species of Searsia, native to southern Africa. This tree occurs throughout the whole of South Africa, a part of Botswana, Zimbabwe and Tanzania and in some areas of Namibia near Windhoek.

It is very variable in all respects, though it is usually bushy and often thorny. It is found in bushveld, dry thornveld, on rocky hillsides, termite mounds, water courses and even on the fringes of forests. It is very hardy, tough, drought resistant and deciduous.

The leaves are attractive and trifoliolate and it sometimes has large, woody thorns.

Flowers are very small, greenish and are borne in summer. The male and female flowers are borne on separate trees and the female trees bear small fruits 3–4 mm in diameter, which turn red when ripe.

The tree attracts a multitude of birds and insects due to its nutritious fruit and is an attractive addition to a garden. It is a host plant for the moth Xylopteryx arcuata.

== Bibliography ==
- Van Wyk, Braam; Van Wyk, Piet (1997). Field Guide to Trees of Southern Africa. Struik.
- Media related to Searsia pyroides at Wikimedia Commons
