= Pseudobersama =

Scientific classification
- Kingdom: Plantae
- Clade: Tracheophytes
- Clade: Angiosperms
- Clade: Eudicots
- Clade: Rosids
- Order: Sapindales
- Family: Meliaceae
- Genus: Pseudobersama; Verdc.
- Species: P. mossambicensis

Binomial name
- Pseudobersama mossambicensis (Sim) Verdc.

Genus of plants

Pseudobersama is a monotypic genus of flowering plants belonging to the family Meliaceae. The only species is Pseudobersama mossambicensis.

Its native range is Kenya to KwaZulu-Natal. It is dioecious.
