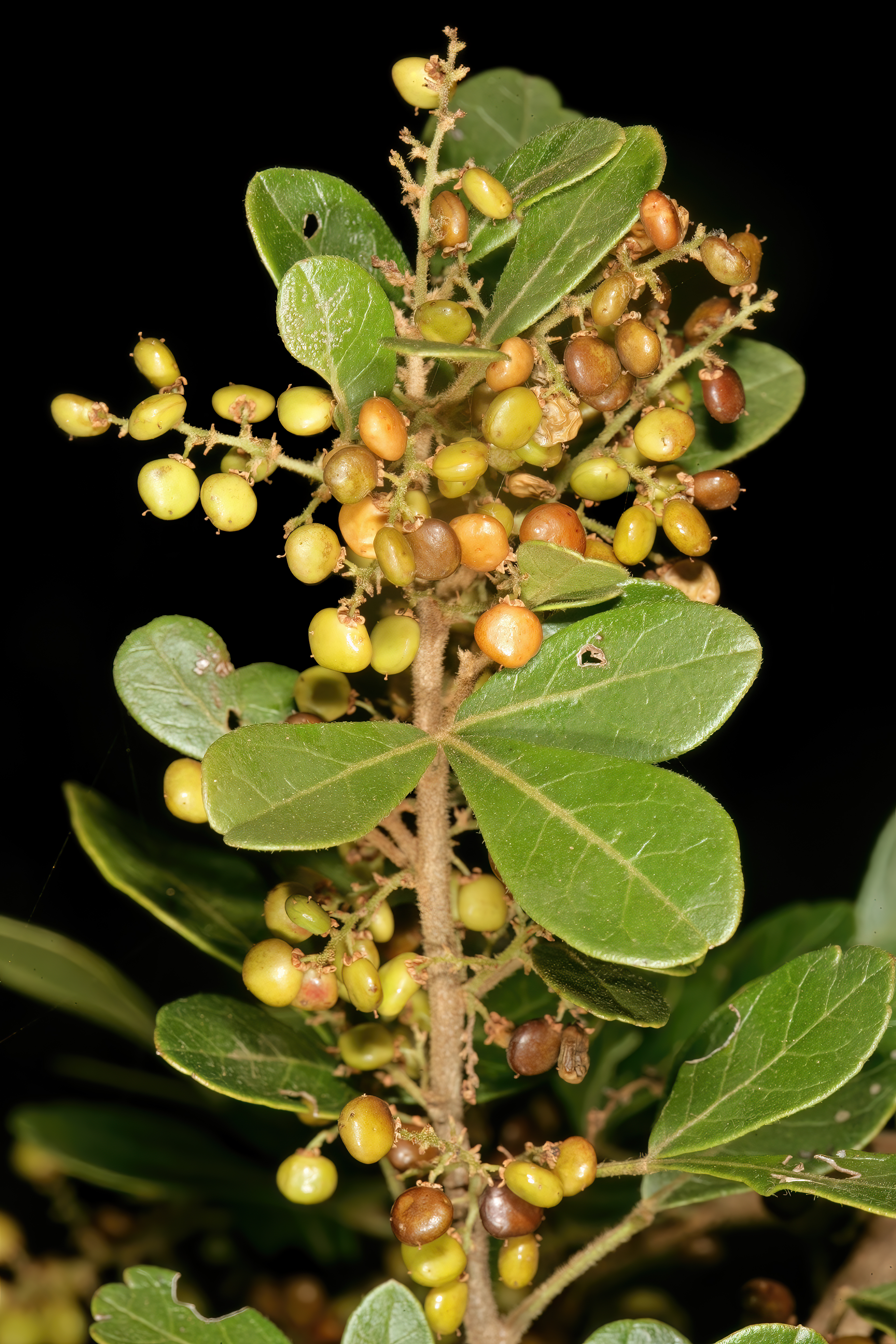

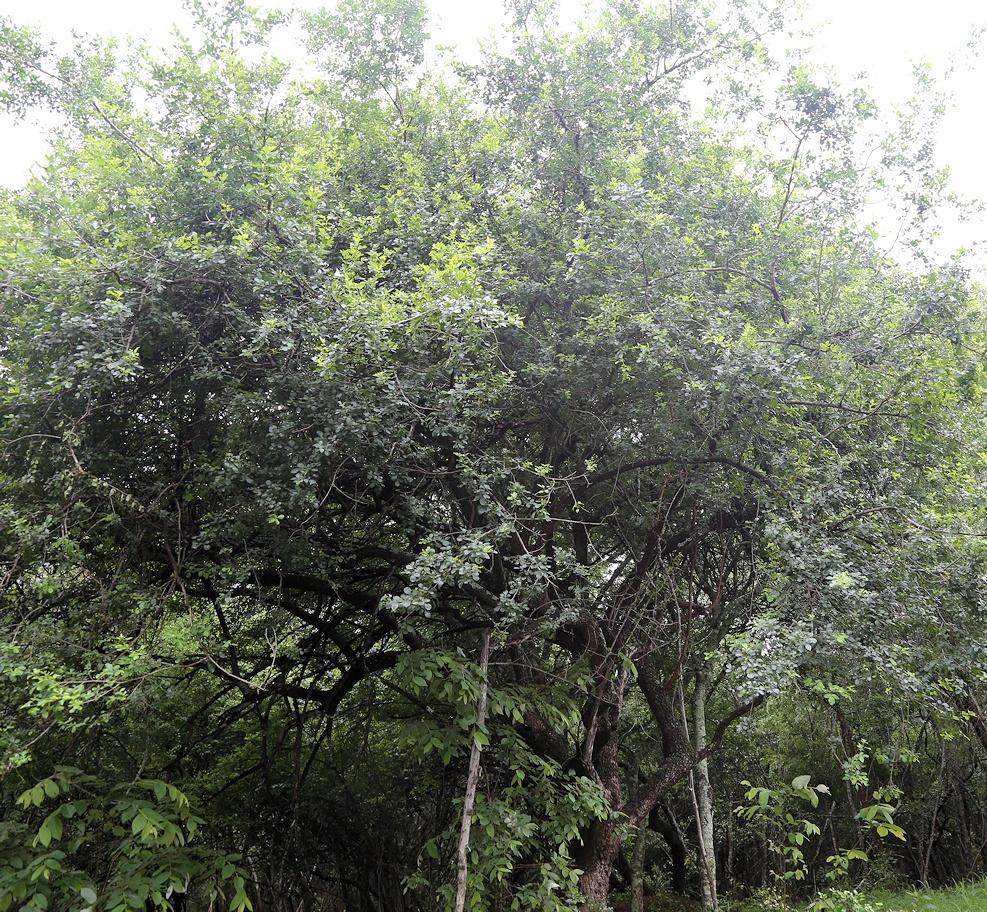

Conservation status
- Least Concern (IUCN 3.1)

Scientific classification
- Kingdom: Plantae
- Clade: Tracheophytes
- Clade: Angiosperms
- Clade: Eudicots
- Clade: Rosids
- Order: Sapindales
- Family: Anacardiaceae
- Genus: Searsia
- Species: S. pentheri

Binomial name
- Searsia pentheri (Zahlbr.) Moffett

Synonyms
- Rhus pentheri Zahlbr.

= Searsia pentheri =

Species of tree endemic to eastern South Africa and southern Mozambique

Searsia pentheri, the common crowberry (English), gewone kraaibessie (Afrikaans), iNhlokoshiyane (Zulu), or mutasiri (Venda), is a species of tree in the genus Searsia. Frost hardy tree reaching a height of up to 6 metres. The tree is mainly evergreen but loses its leaves in severe winters. It has olive-green foliage with dark brown bark and can be grown in either full sun or semi shade. Small flowers are produced and are followed by masses of shiny, light brown, small edible fruits, which provide a feast for birds. Only female trees produce these fruits though. The tree occurs over large portions of South Africa. It has been planted in Spain.

== Gallery ==
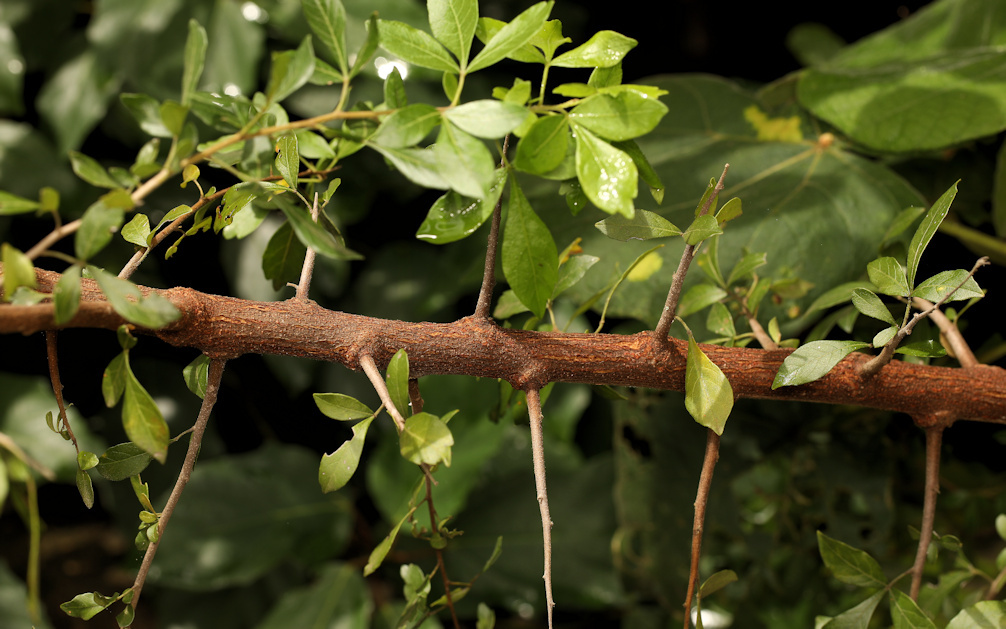
Close up of branch

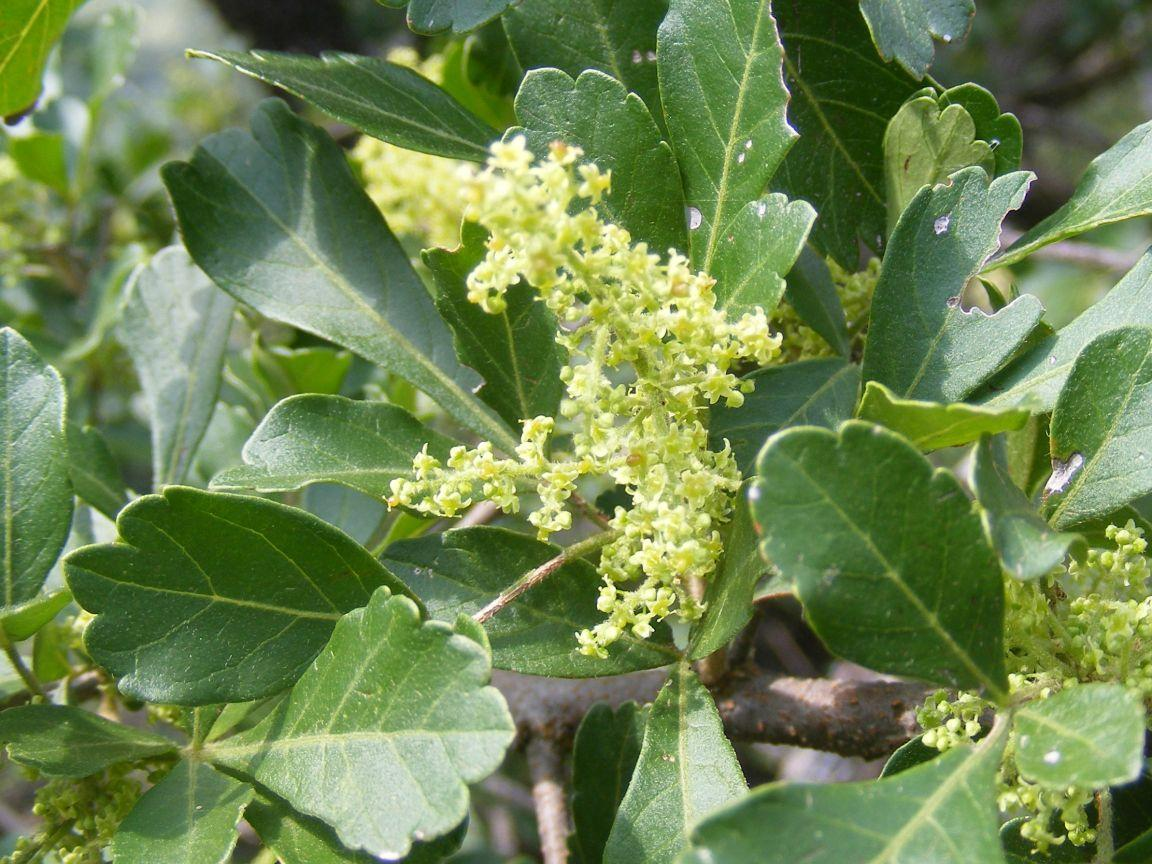
Close up of flowers

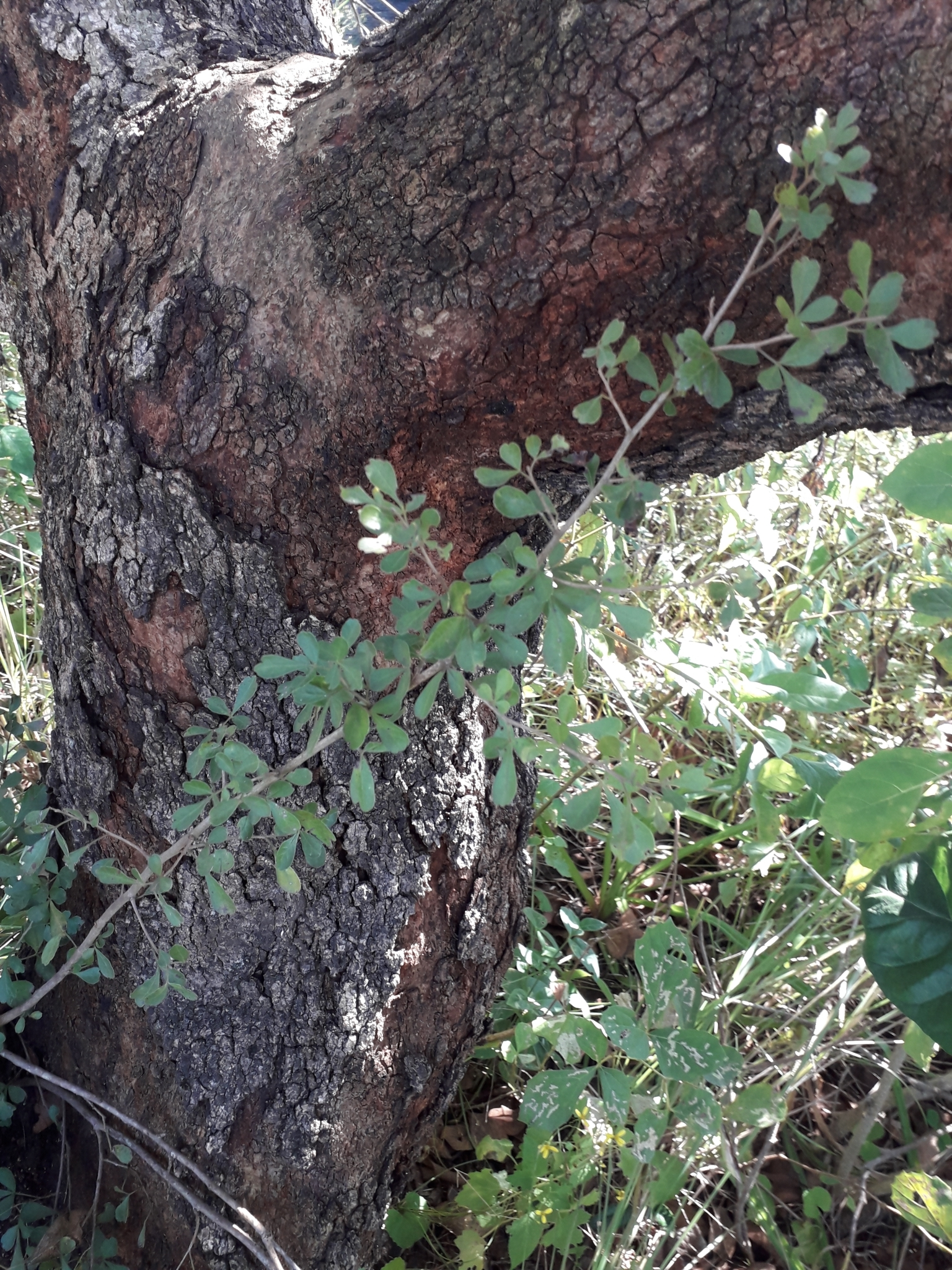
Bark
