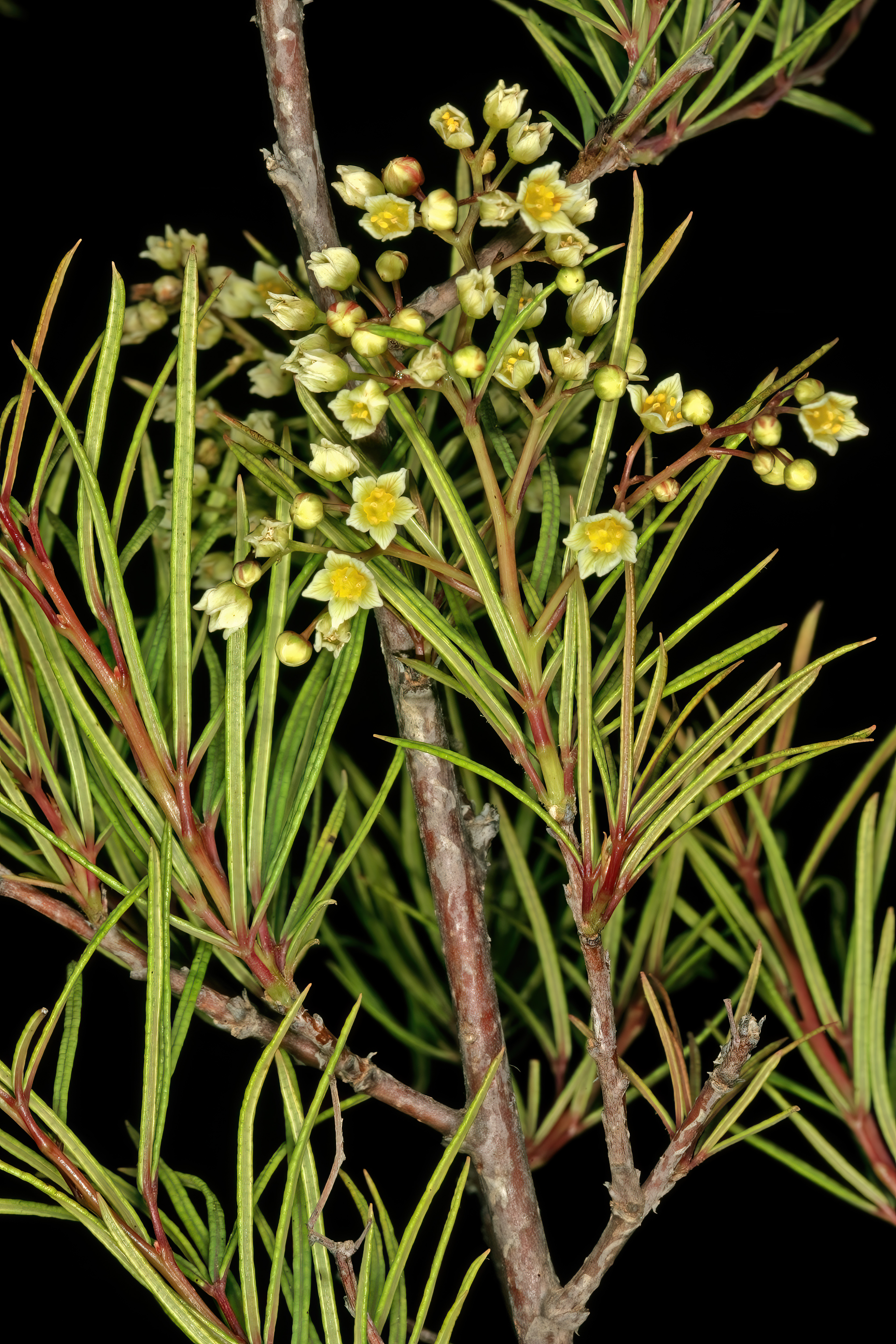
- Male flowers
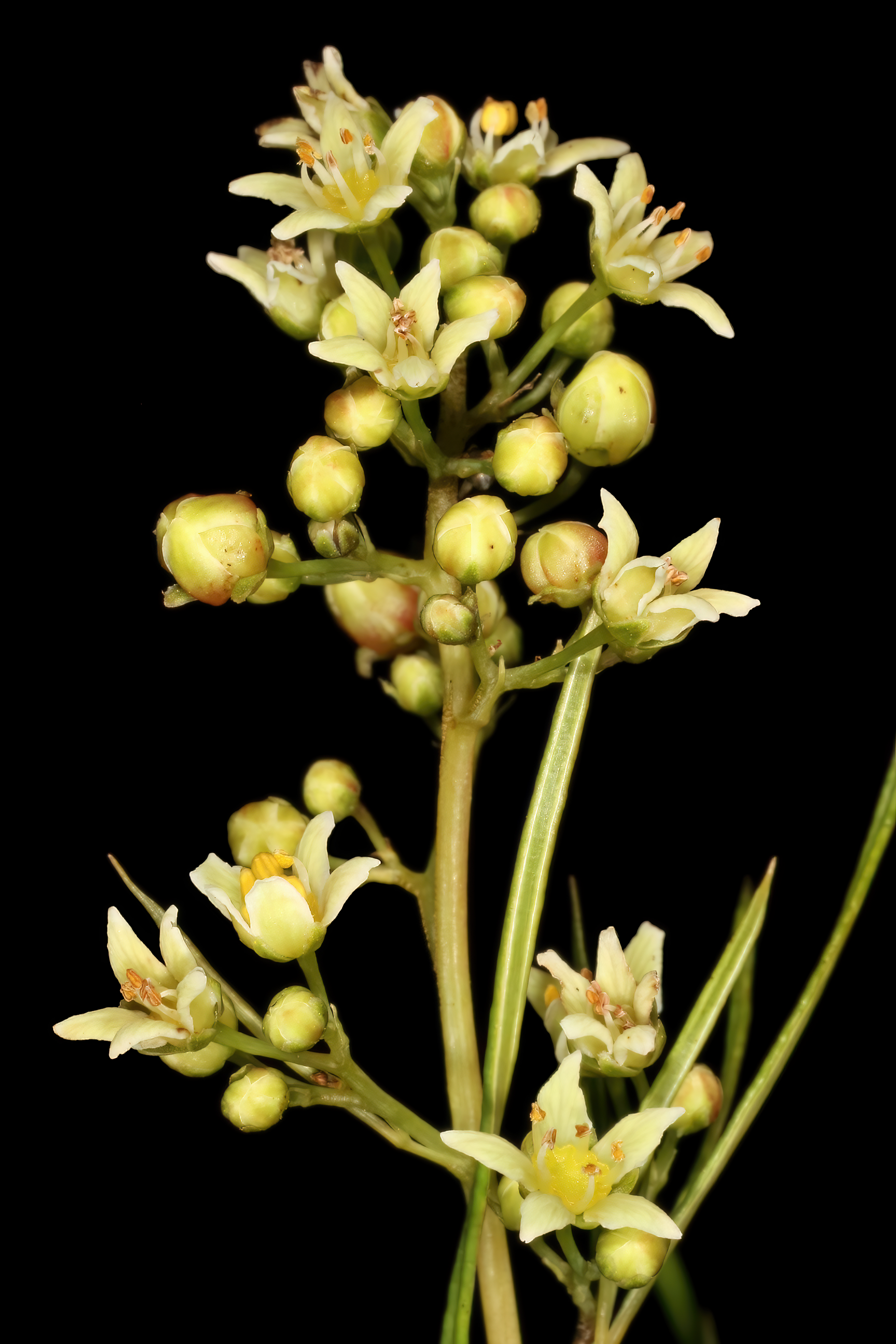
- Male flowers and buds

Scientific classification
- Kingdom: Plantae
- Clade: Tracheophytes
- Clade: Angiosperms
- Clade: Eudicots
- Clade: Rosids
- Order: Sapindales
- Family: Anacardiaceae
- Genus: Searsia
- Species: S. rosmarinifolia

Binomial name
- Searsia rosmarinifolia (Vahl) F.A.Barkley

Synonyms
- Rhus rosmarinifolia Vahl; Rhus rosmarinifolia var. swellendamensis Eckl. & Zeyh.; Toxicodendron rosmarinifolium (Vahl) Kuntze

= Searsia rosmarinifolia =

Species of plant

Searsia rosmarinifolia is a species of flowering plant in the family Anacardiaceae, native to the Cape Provinces of South Africa. A shrub, it is typically found in the fynbos.
