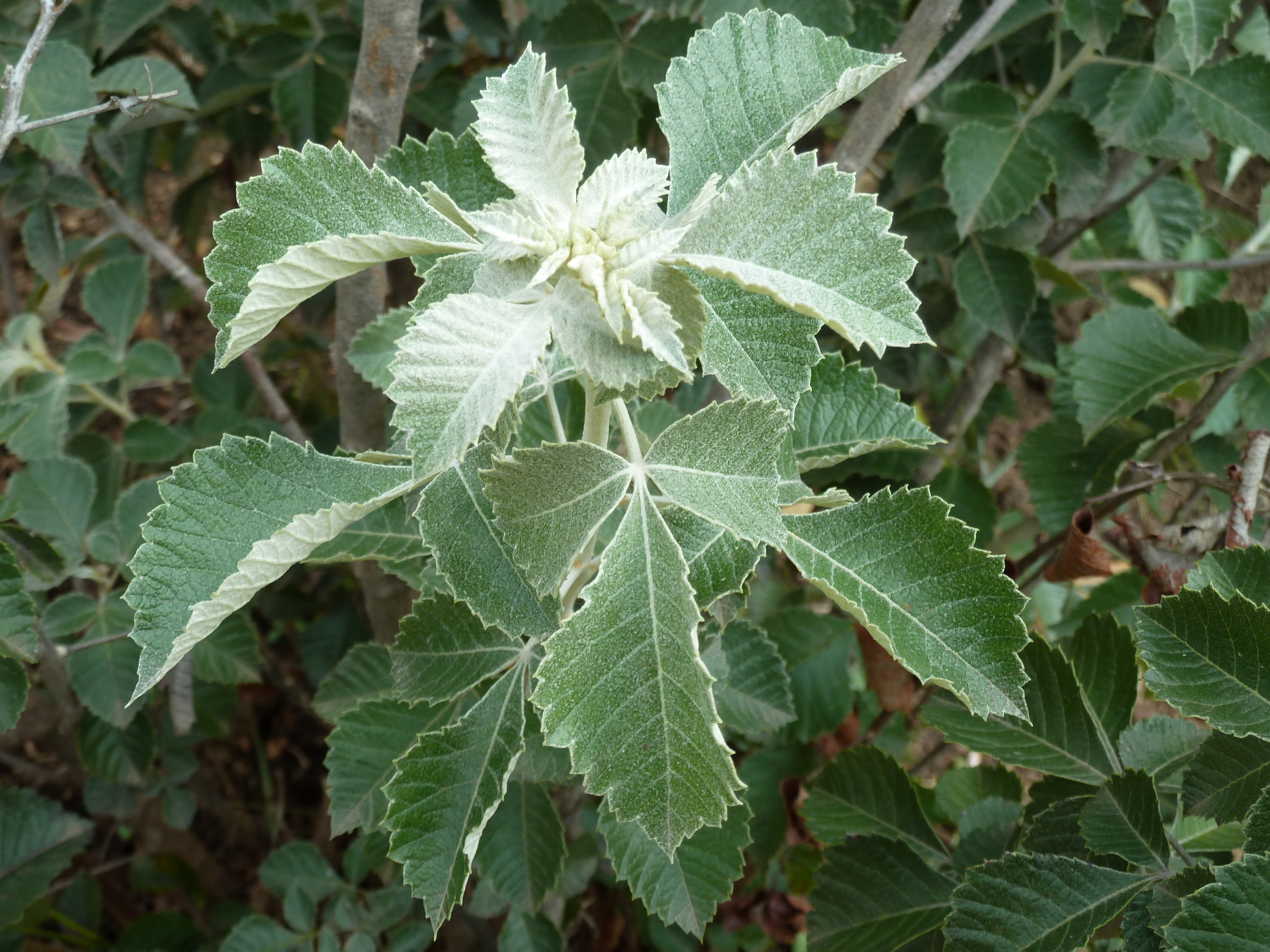
- In the Walter Sisulu Botanical Garden

Scientific classification
- Kingdom: Plantae
- Clade: Tracheophytes
- Clade: Angiosperms
- Clade: Eudicots
- Clade: Rosids
- Order: Sapindales
- Family: Anacardiaceae
- Genus: Searsia
- Species: S. batophylla

Binomial name
- Searsia batophylla (Codd) Mofffett
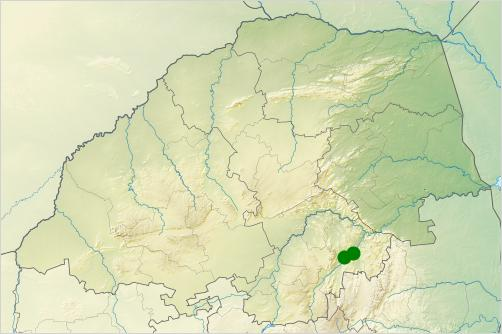
- Range of Searsia batophylla in the Sekhukhuneland centre of endemism

Synonyms
- Rhus batophylla Codd

= Searsia batophylla =

Species of plant

Searsia batophylla (syn. Rhus batophylla), the bramble currant, is a localized shrub that is endemic to the vicinities of Steelpoort and Burgersfort in Sekhukhuneland, Limpopo, South Africa. It is an evergreen, drought resistant plant that grows in the rain shadow of the Limpopo Drakensberg. Its natural range has been impacted by mining, human settlements and overgrazing. Though locally common in 26 sub-populations, it is estimated that they have been reduced to some 30% of their former population and range due to these human activities.
