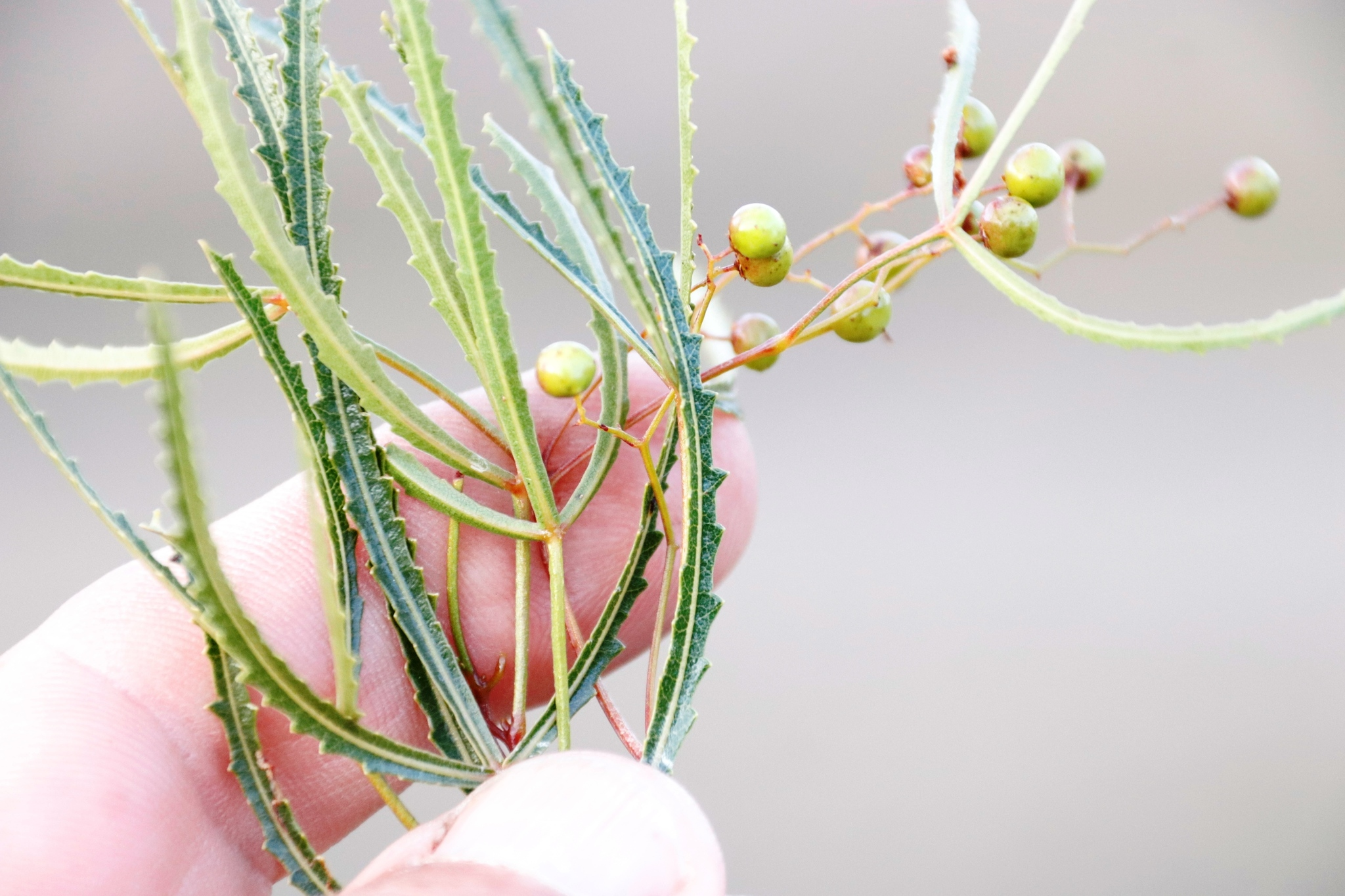
- Close-up of Searsia erosa

Conservation status
- Least Concern (SANBI Red List)

Scientific classification
- Kingdom: Plantae
- Clade: Tracheophytes
- Clade: Angiosperms
- Clade: Eudicots
- Clade: Rosids
- Order: Sapindales
- Family: Anacardiaceae
- Genus: Searsia
- Species: S. erosa

Binomial name
- Searsia erosa (Thunb.) Moffett

Synonyms
- Toxicodendron erosum (Thunb.) Kuntze

= Searsia erosa =

Species of tree

Searsia erosa, or the broom karee, is a shrub native to Botswana, South Africa, and Lesotho.

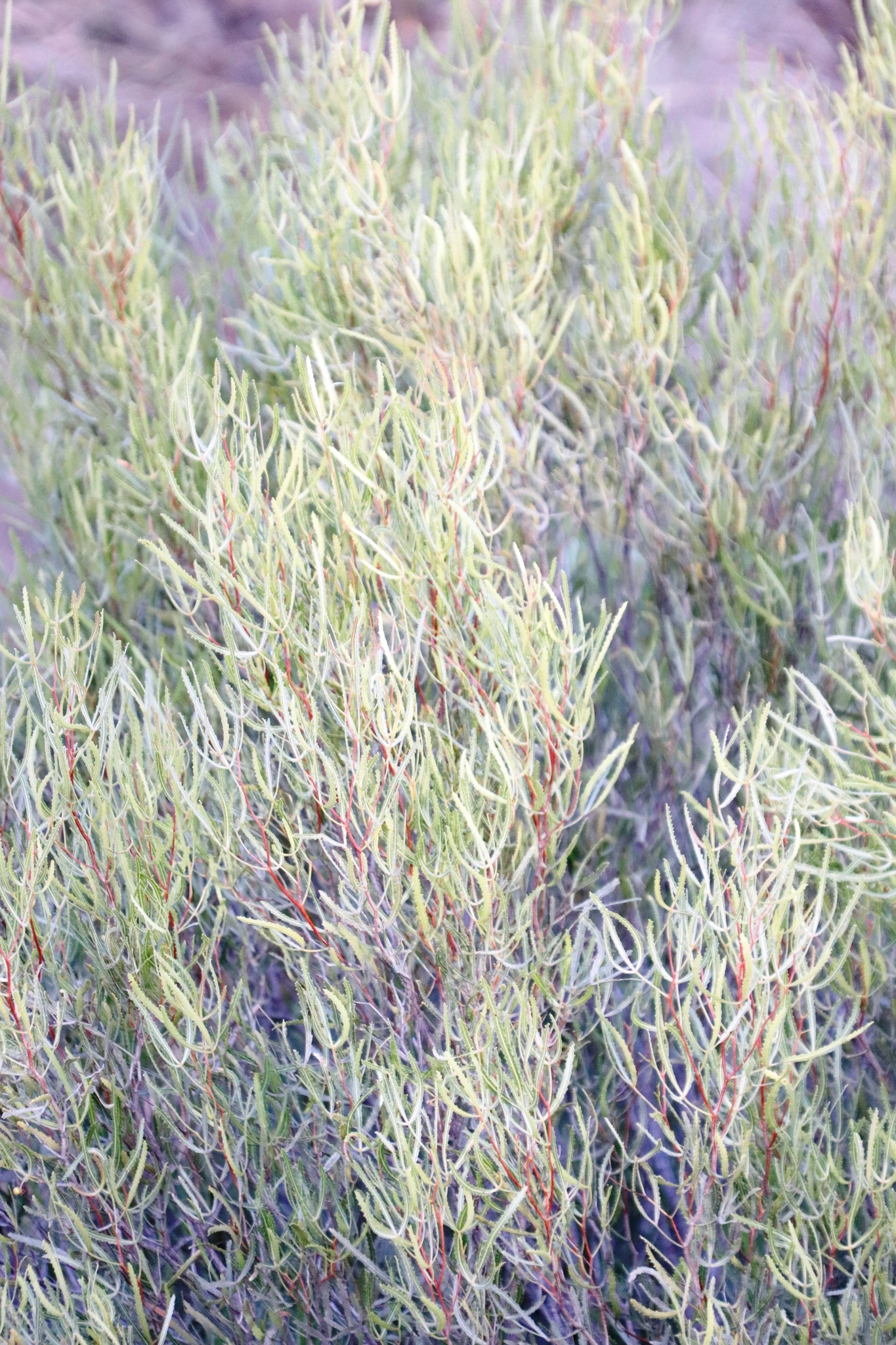
Broom karree in Golden Gate Highlands National Park, South Africa
