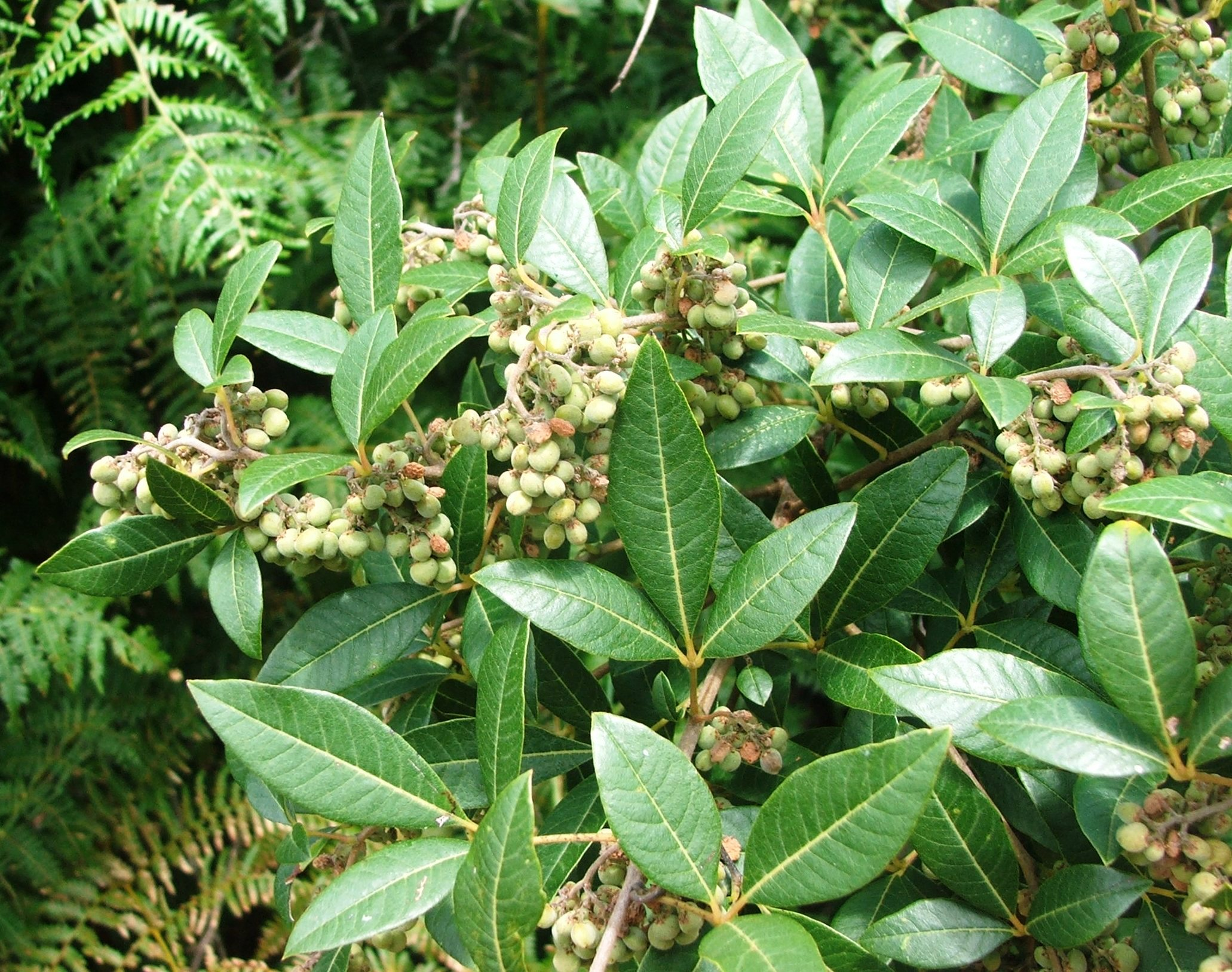

Scientific classification
- Kingdom: Plantae
- Clade: Tracheophytes
- Clade: Angiosperms
- Clade: Eudicots
- Clade: Rosids
- Order: Sapindales
- Family: Anacardiaceae
- Genus: Searsia
- Species: S. tomentosa

Binomial name
- Searsia tomentosa (L.) F.A.Barkley (1943)

Synonyms
- Rhus bicolor Licht. ex Schult. (1820); Rhus ecklonis Schrad. ex Sond. (1860); Rhus elliptica Thunb. (1818); Rhus lobata Poir. (1817); Rhus mollis Jacq. in Fragm. Bot.: 74 (1809); Rhus plukenetiana Eckl. & Zeyh. (1836); Rhus tomentosa L. (1753); Rhus viticifolia F.Muell. ex Benth. (1863); Toxicodendron tomentosum (L.) Kuntze (1891); Toxicodendron viticifolium (F.Muell. ex Benth.) Kuntze (1891)

= Searsia tomentosa =

Species of tree

Searsia tomentosa, the real wild currant (English), umhlakoti (Zulu) or korentebos (Afrikaans), is a small, bushy, evergreen tree. It is native to South Africa, Lesotho, and Zimbabwe. It occurs in fynbos and coastal shrub in South Africa, where it is naturally most common in forest margins.

The sprays of small greenish flowers emit an unpleasant smell that attracts flies. However it is also an attractive shrub and is grown internationally in botanical gardens for its multi-coloured foliage.
