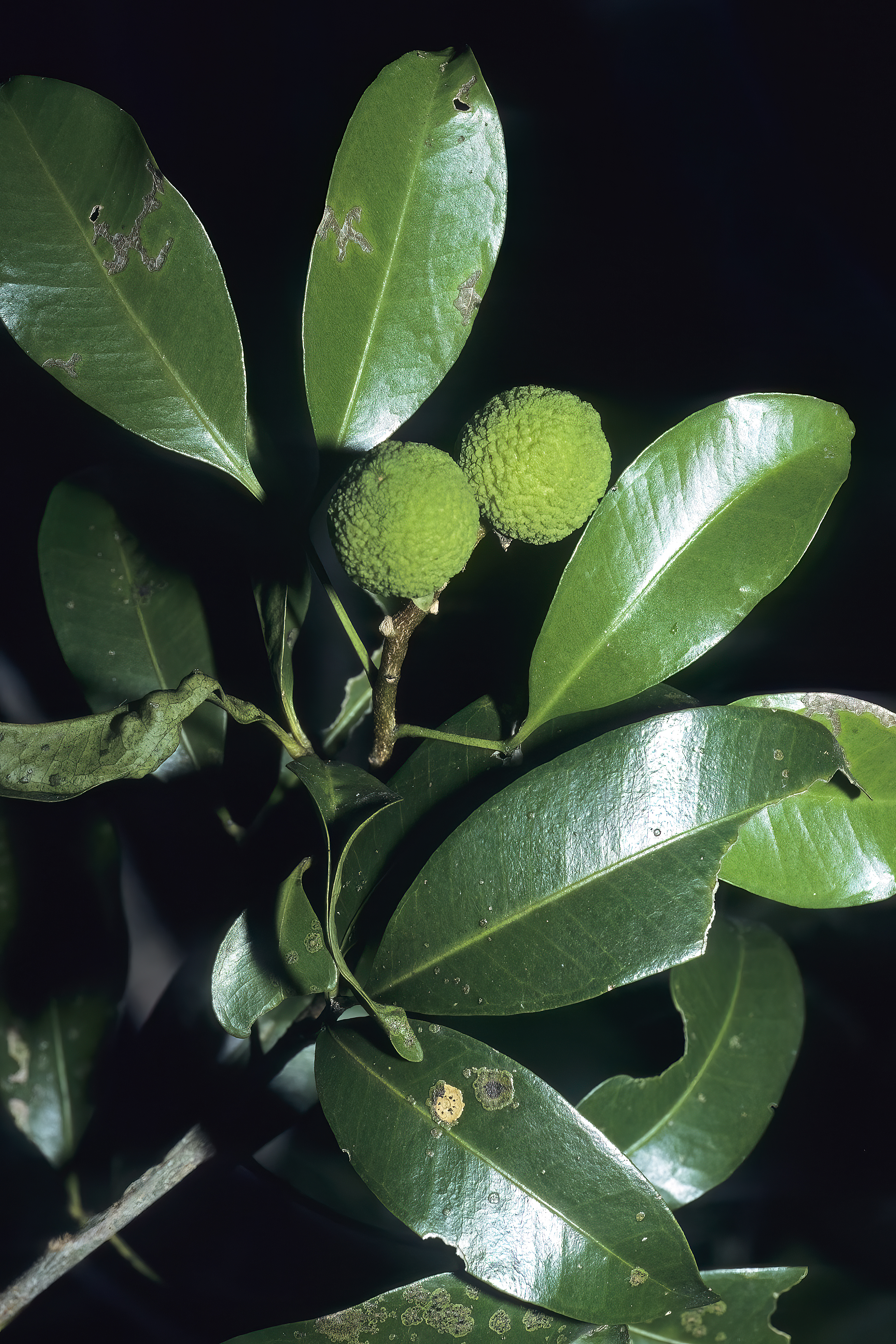

Conservation status
- Least Concern (IUCN 3.1)

Scientific classification
- Kingdom: Plantae
- Clade: Tracheophytes
- Clade: Angiosperms
- Clade: Eudicots
- Clade: Rosids
- Order: Sapindales
- Family: Rutaceae
- Genus: Vepris
- Species: V. bremekampii

Binomial name
- Vepris bremekampii (I.Verd.) Mziray

Synonyms
- Toddaliopsis bremekampii I.Verd.

= Vepris bremekampii =

Species of plant

Vepris bremekampii (syn. Toddaliopsis bremekampii), the wart-berry or wild mandarin, is a species of flowering plant in the family Rutaceae, native to southern Mozambique and northern South Africa. An evergreen shrub or small tree reaching 6 m (20 ft), its 1.4 cm (0.6 in) fruit are wrinkled and warty with a resemblance to Citrus.
