= Smelophyllum =

Scientific classification
- Kingdom: Plantae
- Clade: Tracheophytes
- Clade: Angiosperms
- Clade: Eudicots
- Clade: Rosids
- Order: Sapindales
- Family: Sapindaceae
- Genus: Smelophyllum; Radlk. (1878)
- Species: S. capense

Binomial name
- Smelophyllum capense Radlk. (1878)

Synonyms
- Sapindus capensis Sond. (1860), nom. illeg.

Genus of plants

Smelophyllum capense is a species of flowering plant belonging to the family Sapindaceae. It is the sole species in genus Smelophyllum. It is a tree endemic to the Cape Provinces of South Africa.
