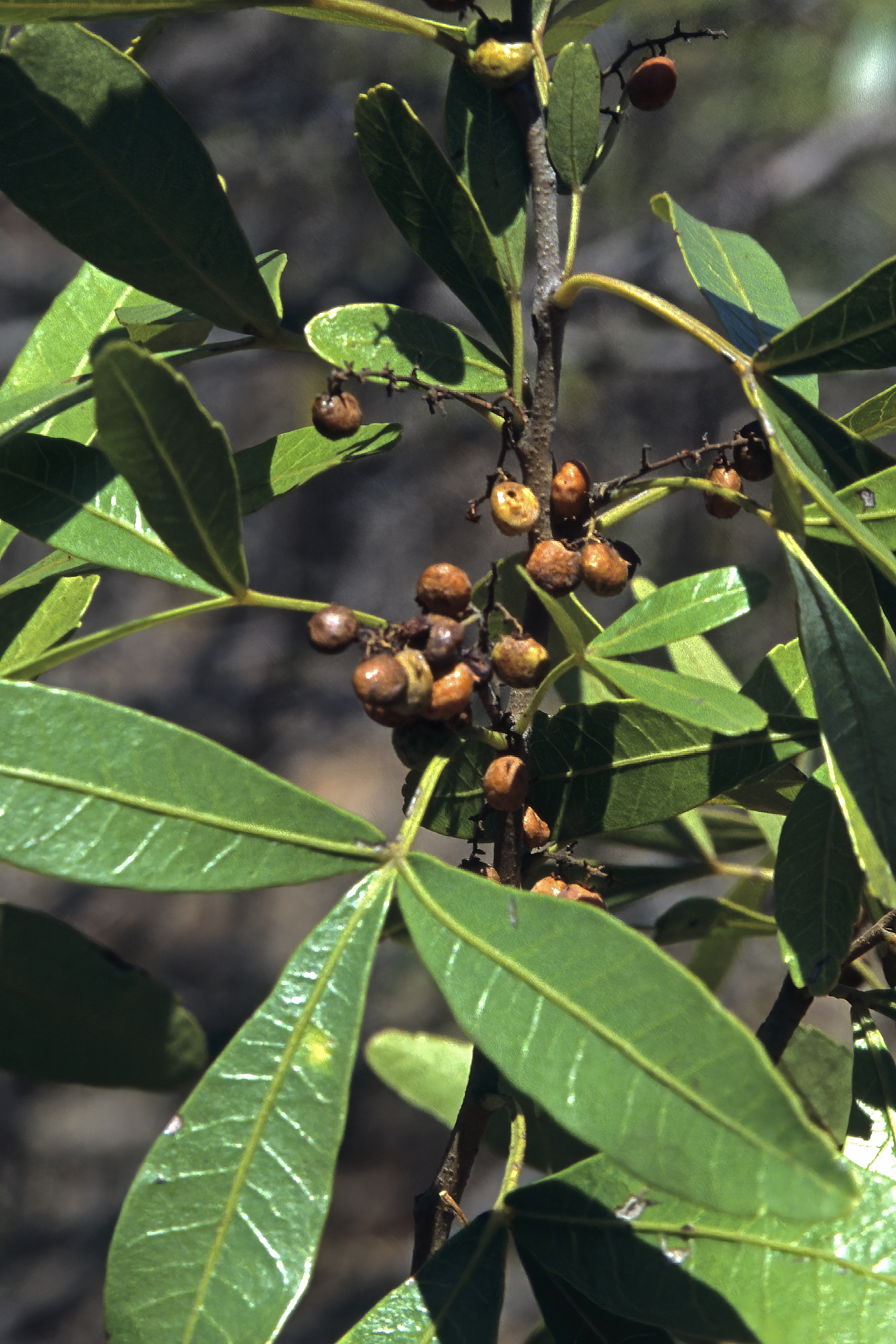
- In Limpopo, South Africa

Scientific classification
- Kingdom: Plantae
- Clade: Tracheophytes
- Clade: Angiosperms
- Clade: Eudicots
- Clade: Rosids
- Order: Sapindales
- Family: Anacardiaceae
- Genus: Searsia
- Species: S. sekhukhuniensis

Binomial name
- Searsia sekhukhuniensis (Moffett) Moffett

Synonyms
- Rhus sekhukhuniensis Moffett

= Searsia sekhukhuniensis =

Species of plant

Searsia sekhukhuniensis is a medium-sized, deciduous tree, reaching a height of about 3 metres and a spread of 4 metres. It is endemic to South Africa.
