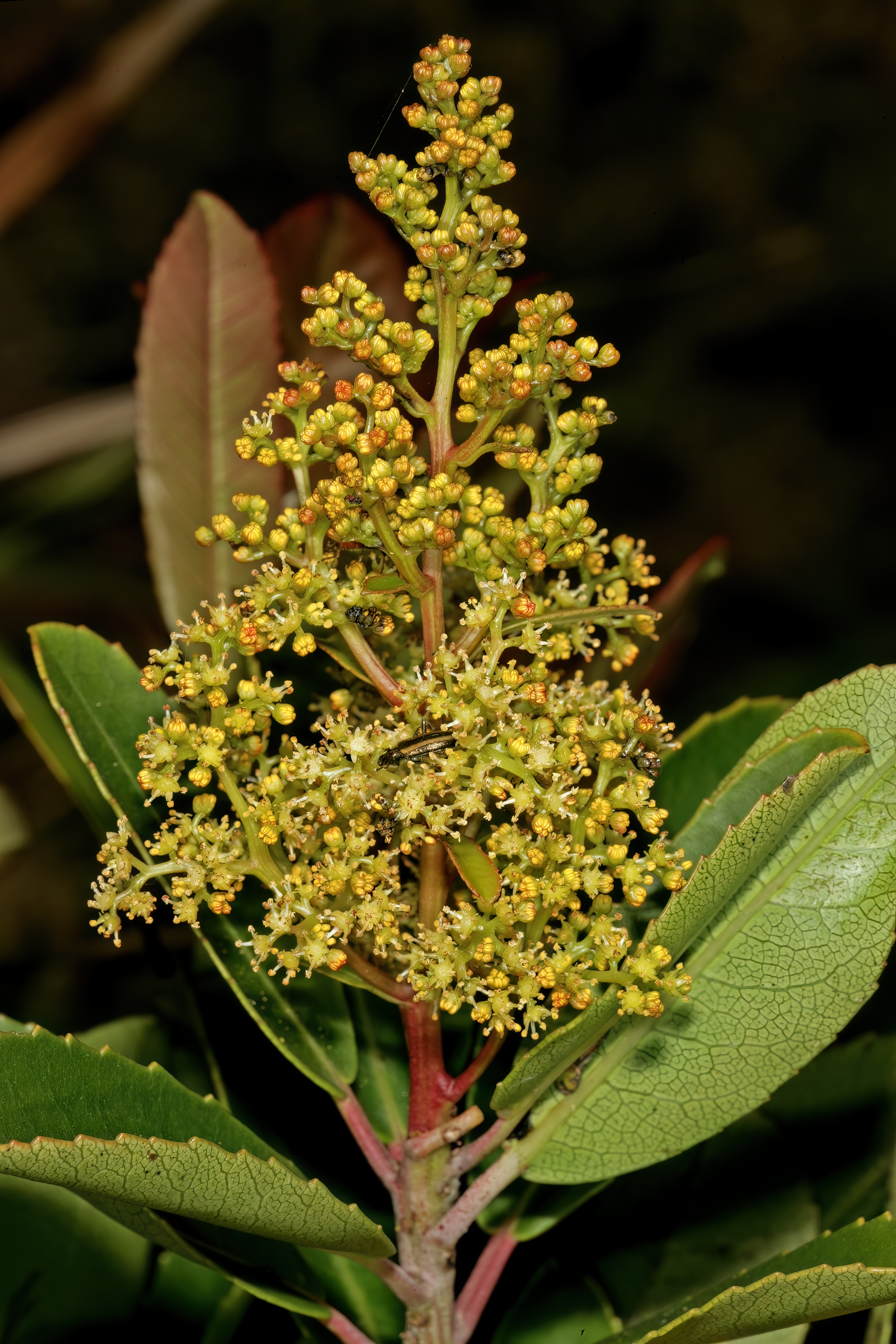
- Laurophyllus capensis in Western Cape, South Africa

Conservation status
- Least Concern (IUCN 3.1)

Scientific classification
- Kingdom: Plantae
- Clade: Tracheophytes
- Clade: Angiosperms
- Clade: Eudicots
- Clade: Rosids
- Order: Sapindales
- Family: Anacardiaceae
- Subfamily: Anacardioideae
- Genus: Laurophyllus; Thunb. (1792)
- Species: L. capensis

Binomial name
- Laurophyllus capensis Thunb. (1792)

Synonyms
- Botryceras Willd.; Amyris novaehollandiae Steud. (1840); Botryceras capensis (Thunb.) Druce (1916 publ. 1917); Botryceras laurinum Willd. (1811); Daphnitis capensis Spreng. (1824)

= Laurophyllus =

Genus of shrubs

Laurophyllus is a monotypic genus of dioecious shrubs in the subfamily Anacardioideae of the cashew and sumac family Anacardiaceae. It contains the single species Laurophyllus capensis, which is endemic to the Eastern Cape province of South Africa. The species is found on wooded hillsides and by streams.
