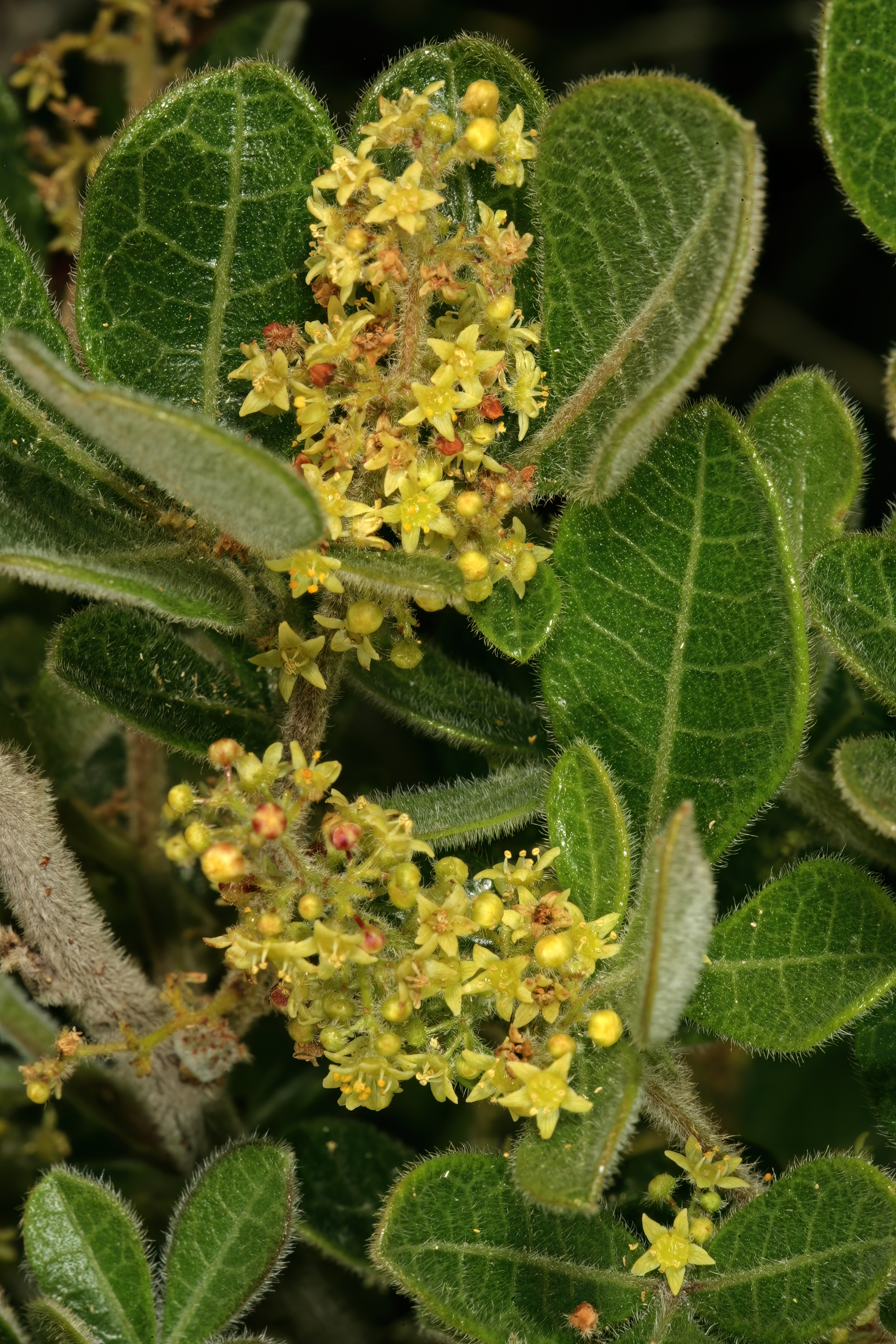
- Searsia laevigata var. villosa

Scientific classification
- Kingdom: Plantae
- Clade: Tracheophytes
- Clade: Angiosperms
- Clade: Eudicots
- Clade: Rosids
- Order: Sapindales
- Family: Anacardiaceae
- Genus: Searsia
- Species: S. laevigata

Binomial name
- Searsia laevigata (L.) F.A.Barkley

Synonyms
- Rhus laevigata L.

= Searsia laevigata =

Species of tree

Searsia laevigata, the dune currant rhus, is a small, bushy, evergreen tree that occurs in rocky fynbos slopes and coastal shrub in South Africa.

== Description ==
It looks very similar to its close relative Searsia glauca but has larger leaflets. It was previously classified as Rhus laevigata

== Distribution ==
This species is primarily coastal, occurring in coastal dunes along the western and southern coast of the former Cape Province, South Africa.

The low-growing variety villosa, with hairy (villose) leaflets, is exclusively coastal.

However, the hairless variety Searsia laevigata var. laevigata, while occurring along the coast, also extends inland as far as the Little Karoo in the north, and Bredasdorp in the west.
