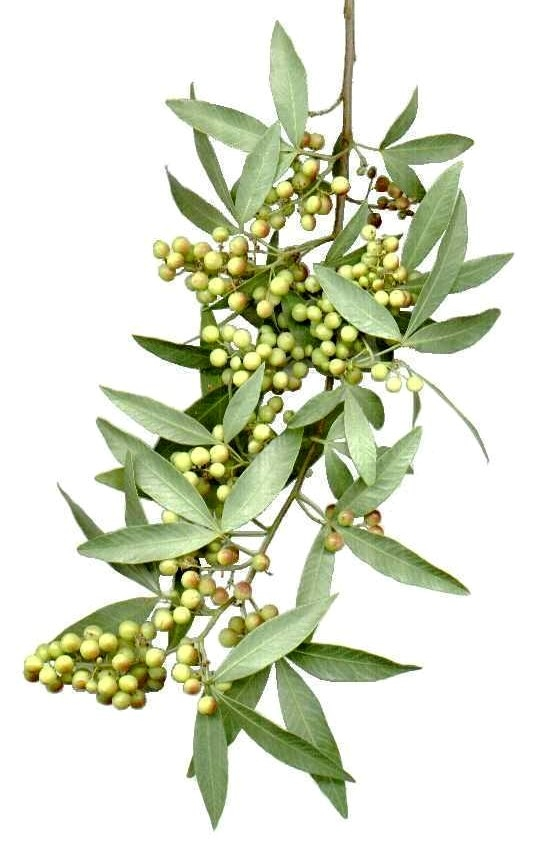
- Drooping branch with drupes

Scientific classification
- Kingdom: Plantae
- Clade: Tracheophytes
- Clade: Angiosperms
- Clade: Eudicots
- Clade: Rosids
- Order: Sapindales
- Family: Anacardiaceae
- Genus: Searsia
- Species: S. pendulina

Binomial name
- Searsia pendulina (Jacq.) Moffett (2007)

Synonyms
- Rhus pallida E.Mey. (1843), not validly publ.; Rhus pendulina Jacq. (1804)

= Searsia pendulina =

White karee

Species of tree

Searsia pendulina, commonly known as the white karee (English) or witkaree (Afrikaans), is a hardy, very fast growing, semi-deciduous tree. It is native to Namibia and to the Free State and Cape Provinces of South Africa. It occurs naturally along the Orange River and some of its tributaries.

== Description ==
Searsia pendulina is wind and drought resistant and has a pleasing, slightly drooping effect, somewhat similar to a weeping willow. It can reach a height of up to 10 metres but usually only reaches 6 to 8 metres height, with a spread of about 5 metres. The species is protected in the Northern Cape.

In summer it produces sprays of inconspicuous flowers that attract insects. Male and female flowers are on separate trees and the female trees bear bunches of small, round edible fruits in late summer, mostly eaten by birds.

== Uses ==
It is widely used in South Africa as a pavement and garden tree, as it propagates easily, grows fast and flourishes in full sun. It is not invasive and makes an excellent shade tree. As with most trees they should not be planted very near to paving, swimming pools, pipes or walls, as their fast growth may quickly affect these. They however have a non-aggressive root system.

Medium semi-deciduous tree - strong and fast growth - usually with more than one trunk. It displays a soft green colour with very fine leaves. Not suited to plant close to buildings, nor to park underneath, due to a very fine powder which can cause staining. Excellent as a tree to lure birds and insects, as well as providing beautiful shade. Wind and weather resistant, can deal with too much water as well as droughts.

== Pictures ==
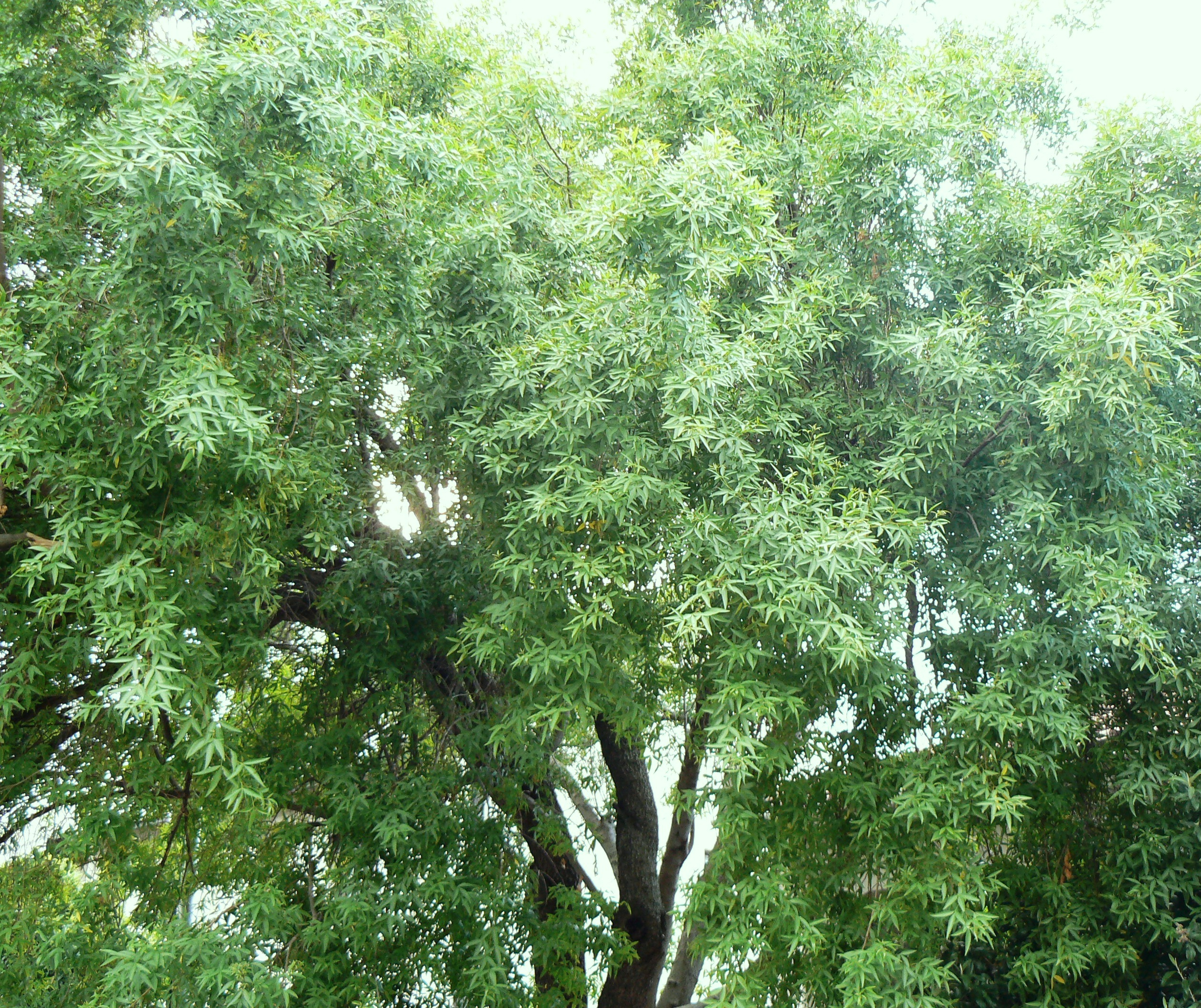
habit

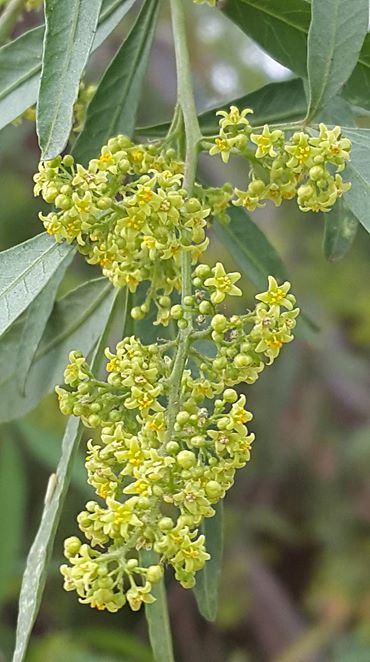
inflorescence

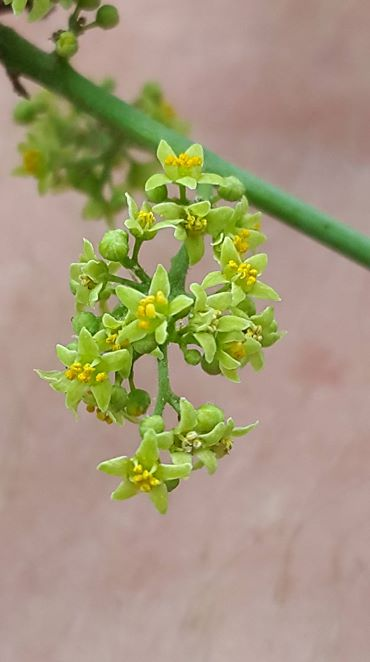
close-up of flowers
