= Bali (disambiguation) =

Bali is an island province of Indonesia.

Bali may also refer to:

== Places ==
=== Africa ===
- Bali, Cameroon, a city in West Africa
- Bali, Ethiopia, a region in south-eastern Ethiopia
- Bali, Nigeria, a Local Government Area in Taraba State

=== Asia ===
- Balahi, a village in Kermanshah Province, Iran, also known as Bali
- Bali, Bhutan, a village
- Bali, Lanzhou, a town of Lanzhou, China
- Bali District, a district of New Taipei City in the Republic of China (Taiwan)
- Bali, Rajasthan, a city in the Indian state of Rajasthan
  - Bali (Rajasthan Assembly constituency), the state assembly constituency comprising the city
- Bali Sea, north of the island of Bali
- Bali Strait, between the Indonesian islands of Bali and Java
- Bali, Bagpat, a village in the Indian state of Uttar Pradesh
- Bali, West New Britain, alternative name for Unea or Uneapa island on West New Britain, Papua New Guinea
- Berimvand, Sarpol-e Zahab, a village in Kermanshah Province, Iran, also known as Bali
- Bali Dewanganj, a village in West Bengal, India

=== Elsewhere ===
- Bali, Greece, a village on the island of Crete, Greece
- 770 Bali, an asteroid

== Biology ==
- Anelosimus bali, a species of spider found in Bali
- Bali myna, a species of bird in the family Sturnidae
- Bali pony, an ancient pony breed currently living in Bali, Indonesia
- Vepris bali, a species of plant in the family Rutaceae

== Businesses ==
- Bali (lingerie), an American lingerie company
- Bali Air, an inactive airline based in Jakarta, Indonesia
- Bali TV, a privately owned television station covering the island of Bali
- Gran Hotel Bali, a skyscraper in Benidorm, Spain

== Media ==
- Bali (1970 film), an Italian film starring Laura Antonelli
- Bali (2021 film), an Indian Marathi language horror film
- Bali (TV series), a 2005–2006 French-Canadian animated television series
- "Bali", a song by 88Glam from the mixtape 88Glam
- "Bali", a short story by Indian writer Narayan Dharap, adapted into the 2018 horror film Tumbbad

== People ==
=== Kings and mythological figures ===
- Bali (Chandravanshi), a ruler of Bharatkhand in the Mahabharata
- Vali (Ramayana) (also spelled Bali), a Vanara king from the epic Ramayana
- Mahabali, a Shaiva asura who surrendered his kingdom to Vamana
- Mahabali (disambiguation), several characters
- Simuka, or Bali, a king of the Satavahana dynasty
- Bali, or Baliraj, a 15th-century king of the Kallala dynasty of Nepal
- Baliraja, a 9th-century king of the Licchavi kingdom
- Baliraja, a 10th-century king of the Chahamanas of Naddula

=== Other people ===
- Bali (name)

== Religion ==
- Bali, or Bajrang Bali, another name of the god Hanuman
- Bali (sacrifice), a ritual sacrifice including animals
- Torma, Tibetan term for Buddhist offering cakes, called bali or balingha in Sanskrit

== Other uses ==
- Bali language (disambiguation), which may refer to any of several languages
- Bali (tribe), an Arab tribe with branches in Saudi Arabia, Jordan, Egypt and Sudan
- Short for balisong knife, a type of folding knife
- Bali United F.C., an association football club in Bali
- USS Bali (ID-2483), a Dutch freighter seized in World War I
- Bali Nine, drug smugglers convicted in Indonesia in 2005
- Balinese script (ISO 15924 code: Bali)

== See also ==
- Balli (disambiguation)
- Vali (disambiguation)
- Balinese (disambiguation)
