= Berimvand =

Berimvand and Berimownd or Barimvand (Persian: بريموند) may refer to:

- Berimvand, Miyan Darband, Kermanshah County
- Berimvand, Qarah Su, Kermanshah County
- Berimvand, Sarpol-e Zahab
