= Adra, Hooghly =

Adra
- Village
- Location in West Bengal, India Adra (India)
- Coordinates: 22°57′02″N 87°45′21″E
- Country: India
- State: West Bengal
- District: Hooghly
- Established: -
- Founder: -
- Named for: -

Government
  - Type: Panchayati raj (India)
  - Body: Gram panchayat
  - MLA: Prasanta Digar(BJP)
  - Lok Sabha MP: Mitali Bag(NCPI)

Area
  - Village: 1.35 km^{2} (0.52 sq mi)
  - Rural: 1.35 km^{2} (0.52 sq mi)

Population (2011)
  - Village: 481(as2,011)
  - Density: 356/km^{2} (923/sq mi)
- Demonym: Bengali

Languages
  - Official: Bengali, English
- Time zone: UTC+5:30 (IST)
- Postal code: 712 602
- ISO 3166 code: IN-WB
- Vehicle registration: WB18
- Website: wb.gov.in

Adra is a village in the Bhadur Gram Panchayat in the Goghat I CD block in the Arambag subdivision of the Hooghly district in the Indian state of West Bengal.

== Demographics ==
=== Religion and language ===
Religion in Adra (2011)
Hinduism	100%
Other or not stated	0%

As per the 2011 census, majority of the population of the district belong to the Hindu community with a population share of 100%. The percentage of the Hindu population of the district has followed a decreasing trend from 87.1% in 1961 to 82.9% in the latest census 2011. On the other hand, the percentage of Muslim population has increased from 12.7% in 1961 to 15.8% in 2011 census.

In the 2011 census Hindus numbered 125,620 and formed 89.71% of the population in Goghat I CD Block. Muslims numbered 13,655 and formed 9.75% of the population. Others numbered 755 and formed 0.54% of the population.

Languages of Adra (2011)
1. Bengali (100.0%)
2. 0.00%
3. Others (0.00%)

At the time of the 2011 census, 100% of population spoke Bengali language in the village.

Historical population
Year	Pop.	±% p.a.
1951	155	—
1961	218	+3.47%
1971	281	+2.57%
1981	335	+1.77%
1991	375	+1.13%
2001	418	+1.09%
2011	481	+1.41%
2020	533	+1.15%

== Area overview ==
The Arambagh subdivision, presented in the map alongside, is divided into two physiographic parts – the Dwarakeswar River being the dividing line. The western part is upland and rocky – it is extension of the terrain of neighbouring Bankura district. The eastern part is flat alluvial plain area. The railways, the roads and flood-control measures have had an impact on the area. The area is overwhelmingly rural with 94.77% of the population living in rural areas and 5.23% of the population living in urban areas.

Arambagh is the nearest town. Arambagh is also a sub-divisional headquarter of Arambag subdivision.

The village also have a large forest which is 41.3 hectare of land area of the village. One-third area of the village total area.

It is located on the bank of the Dwarakeswar River. It bounded by villages -Surjyapur, Pyarinagar, Bhadur, Birampur, Mandalganthi, Sekati & Par Adra.

The village is well connected with road network, there is many other roads which passing through the village. The Adra Road and Senkati Road are the most prominent one which are pakka road, there are many kachcha and concrete roads. There is no school in the village, Bagharbard High School at Mandalganthi village is nearest school.

The CD block headquarters and police station is 9km away from the village. And the district headquarters is about 70km away.

== Economics ==
This is a rice and potato agricultural area. and many other cultivation are also done here this area is a dwarkeshwar river basin.

== Civic administration ==
=== Police station ===
Goghat police station has jurisdiction over Goghat-I CD block.

== Electoral constituencies ==
=== Lok Sabha seat ===
The village comes under Arambagh Lok Sabha seat along with Goghat-I.

=== Vidhan Sabha seat ===
Goghat Vidhan Sabha seat constitute of Goghat-I and Goghat-II.

=== Zilla Parishad ===
There are 53 seats in the district the village comes under 49 no. zilla parishad seat.

=== Panchayet Samiti ===
Goghat I panchayet samiti has 21 seats it comes under 10 no. seat.

=== Gram Panchayet ===
Bhadur Gram Panchayet have 18 wards it comes under 2 no. ward.

Note : the above three tier panchayet seats are according to 2023, it changes accordingly every 5 years during delimitation process.
