= Balli =

Balli may refer to:

== Places ==
Ballı (literally "(place) with honey") is a Turkish place name that may refer to the following places in Turkey:

- Ballı, Ardanuç, a village in the district of Ardanuç, Artvin Province
- Ballı, Kahta, a village in the district of Kahta, Adıyaman Province
- Ballı, Malkara, a village in the district of Malkara, Tekirdağ Province
- Ballı, Mut, a village in the district of Mut, Mersin Province
- Ballı, Erzincan

== People ==
- Balli Kalyanachakravarthy (born 1984), an Indian politician
- Cecilia Ballí (born 1976), an American journalist and anthropologist
- Daniele Balli (born 1967), a former Italian footballer
- Harsharan Singh Balli (born 1948), an Indian politician
- Hatice Ozer Balli, Turkish–New Zealand academic
- Padre Ballí, a rancher, a priest, and an original grantee
- Simone Balli, an Italian painter of the 17th century
- Sonni Balli (1982–2022), a Ghanaian Dancehall artiste
- Veli Balli (born 1949), a Turkish long-distance runner

== Other uses ==
- Balli Dam, a dam under construction in Turkey
- Balli railway station
- Balli, an Albanian nationalist anti-communist resistance movement

== See also ==
- Bali (disambiguation)
