= Balin =

Balin may refer to:

== People ==
- Balin Miller (2002–2025), American climber
- Carole B. Balin, American Reform rabbi, professor of Jewish history
- Ina Balin (1937–1990), American actress
- Marty Balin (1942–2018), American musician
- Mireille Balin (1911–1968), French actress
- Vlastimil Balín (born 1950), Czech politician
- "El Balin", nickname of Honduran soccer player Eduardo Bennett

== Places ==
- Balin, Iran, a village in Kermanshah Province, Iran
- Balin, East Azerbaijan, a village in East Azerbaijan Province, Iran
- Balin, Inowrocław County in Kuyavian-Pomeranian Voivodeship, Poland
- Balin, Rypin County in Kuyavian-Pomeranian Voivodeship, Poland
- Balin, Łódź Voivodeship, Poland
- Balin, Lesser Poland Voivodeship, Poland

== Other uses ==
- Balin (album), by Marty Balin
- Balin (Middle-earth), a dwarf in J. R. R. Tolkien's legendarium of Middle-earth
- Sir Balin, a knight in the legend of King Arthur
- Balin, an alternative form of Bali, a name of various mythological and historical figures of India

== See also ==
- Baline
- Balinese (disambiguation)
- Baling District, Kedah, Malaysia
- Balinge, a town in Drenthe, Netherlands
- Ballin (disambiguation)
