= Baliński =

Baliński (feminine: Balińska) or Balinski is a Polish-language surname. It is a toponymic surname for someone associated with any of various places named Balin. Russian form: Balinsky, Lithuanian: Balinskis.

Notable people with the surname include:

- Damian Baliński (born 1977), Polish motorcycle speedway rider
- Damian Baliński Jr. (born 1989), Polish speedway rider
- Ella Balinska (born 1996), British actress
- Hanna Balińska (born 1943), Polish actress
- Karol Baliński (1817–1864), Polish poet
- Jan Baliński (1827–1902), Polish/Russian psychiatrist
- Maria Balinska (born 1965), American journalist
- Michał Baliński (1794–1864), Polish-Lithuanian historian and publicist
- Michel Balinski (1933–2019), Swiss-born Polish American and French mathematician
- Stanisław Baliński (1889–1984), Polish poet, writer and diplomat
