= Teclea carpopunctifera =

Conservation status
- Vulnerable (IUCN 2.3)

Scientific classification
- Kingdom: Plantae
- Clade: Tracheophytes
- Clade: Angiosperms
- Clade: Eudicots
- Clade: Rosids
- Order: Sapindales
- Family: Rutaceae
- Genus: Vepris?
- Species: T. carpopunctifera

Binomial name
- Teclea carpopunctifera A.Chev.

Species of tree

Teclea carpopunctifera is a small forest tree in the family Rutaceae. The genus Teclea has been synonymized with Vepris, but this species appears not to have been given a name in Vepris and is regarded as "unplaced" by Plants of the World Online. It is endemic to Côte d'Ivoire.
