= Vepris trifoliolata =

Conservation status
- Vulnerable (IUCN 2.3)

Scientific classification
- Kingdom: Plantae
- Clade: Tracheophytes
- Clade: Angiosperms
- Clade: Eudicots
- Clade: Rosids
- Order: Sapindales
- Family: Rutaceae
- Genus: Vepris
- Species: V. trifoliolata

Binomial name
- Vepris trifoliolata (Engl.) Mziray

Synonyms
- Oricia trifoliolata (Engl.) I. Verd.

Species of flowering plant

Vepris trifoliolata is a species of plant in the family Rutaceae. It is endemic to Cameroon. Its natural habitats are subtropical or tropical moist lowland forests and subtropical or tropical moist montane forests. It is threatened by habitat loss.
