= Vepris borenensis =

Conservation status
- Data Deficient (IUCN 3.1)

Scientific classification
- Kingdom: Plantae
- Clade: Tracheophytes
- Clade: Angiosperms
- Clade: Eudicots
- Clade: Rosids
- Order: Sapindales
- Family: Rutaceae
- Genus: Vepris
- Species: V. borenensis

Binomial name
- Vepris borenensis (M.G.Gilbert) W.Mziray

Synonyms
- Teclea borenensis M.G.Gilbert

Species of flowering plant

Vepris borenensis is a species of plant in the family Rutaceae. It is found in Ethiopia and Kenya.
