= Vepris allenii =

Conservation status
- Endangered (IUCN 3.1)

Scientific classification
- Kingdom: Plantae
- Clade: Tracheophytes
- Clade: Angiosperms
- Clade: Eudicots
- Clade: Rosids
- Order: Sapindales
- Family: Rutaceae
- Genus: Vepris
- Species: V. allenii

Binomial name
- Vepris allenii I.Verd.

Species of flowering plant

Vepris allenii is a species of plant in the family Rutaceae. It is endemic to Mozambique.
