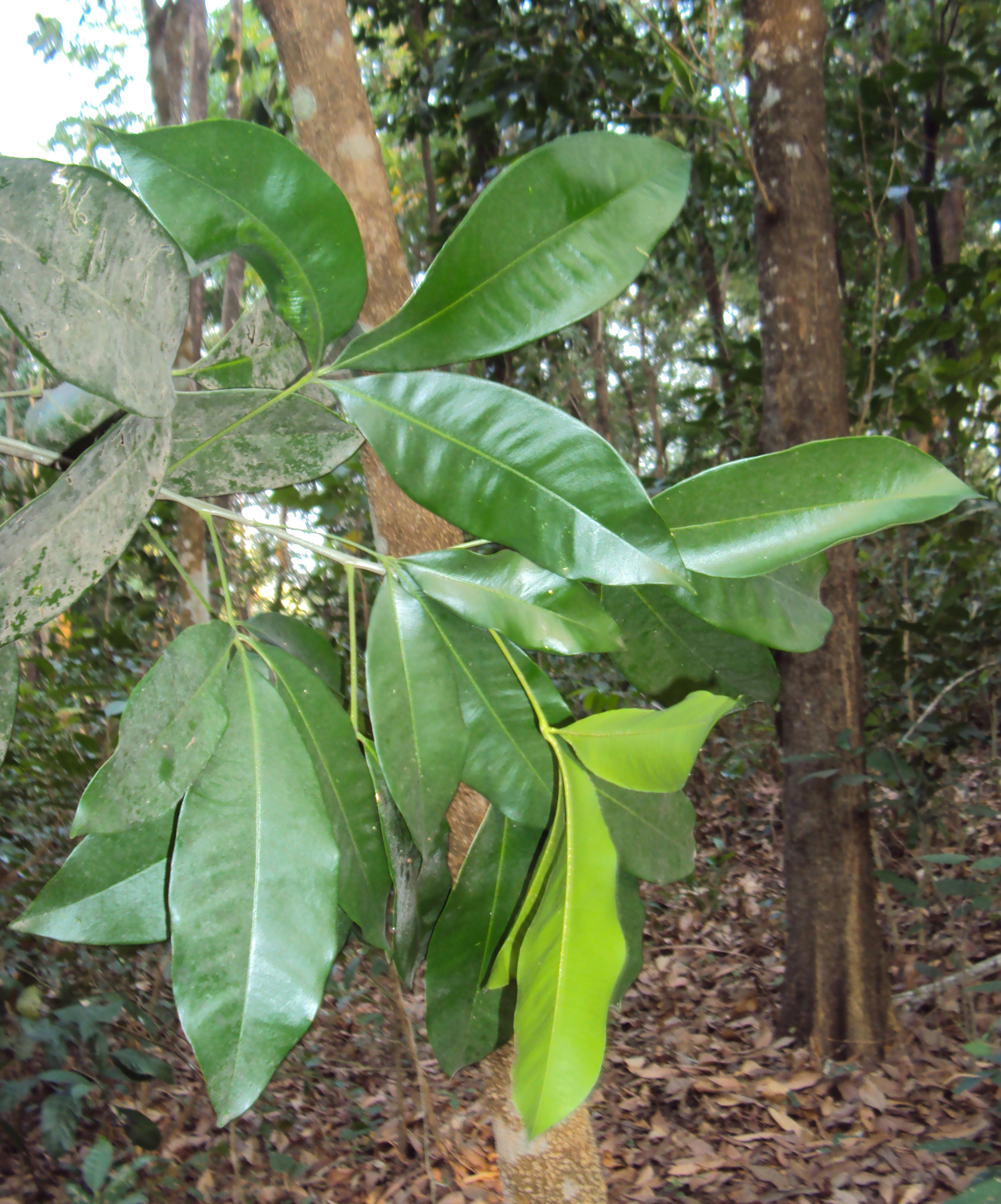

Scientific classification
- Kingdom: Plantae
- Clade: Tracheophytes
- Clade: Angiosperms
- Clade: Eudicots
- Clade: Rosids
- Order: Sapindales
- Family: Rutaceae
- Genus: Vepris
- Species: V. bilocularis

Binomial name
- Vepris bilocularis (Wight & Arn.) Engl.

Synonyms
- Cranzia bilocularis (Wight & Arn.) Kuntze; Dipetalum biloculare (Wight & Arn.) Dalzell; Toddalia bilocularis Wight & Arn.

= Vepris bilocularis =

Species of flowering plant

Vepris bilocularis is a species of plant in the family Rutaceae. The native range of this species is SW. & S. India.

== Description ==
It is an evergreen tree, with grey-brown, lenticellate bark and digitately trifoliolate leaves.
