= Vepris glaberrima =

Conservation status
- Near Threatened (IUCN 2.3)

Scientific classification
- Kingdom: Plantae
- Clade: Tracheophytes
- Clade: Angiosperms
- Clade: Eudicots
- Clade: Rosids
- Order: Sapindales
- Family: Rutaceae
- Genus: Vepris
- Species: V. glaberrima

Binomial name
- Vepris glaberrima (Engl.) J.B.Hall ex D.J.Harris

Synonyms
- Oriciopsis glaberrima Engl.

Species of flowering plant

Vepris glaberrima, synonym Oriciopsis glaberrima, is a species of plant in the family Rutaceae. It is native to Cameroon, the Central African Republic, the Republic of the Congo and Gabon. It is threatened by habitat loss.
