= Balinsky =

Balinsky, feminine: Balinskaya is a Russified form of the Polish surname Baliński. Notable people with the surname include:

- Boris Balinsky (1905–1997), Ukrainian-South African biologist, embryologist, entomologist
- John B. Balinsky (1934–1983), Ukrainian-born zoologist
