= Manas Majumdar =

Indian politician

Member of the West Bengal Legislative Assembly
- In office 2016–2021
- Preceded by: Biswanath Karak
- Succeeded by: Biswanath Karak
- Constituency: Goghat

Personal details
- Party: Trinamool Congress
- Education: Shobhit University
- Profession: Politician

Manas Majumdar is an Indian politician from West Bengal. He was elected as a Member of the Legislative Assembly in 2016 West Bengal Legislative Assembly election from Goghat, as a member of the Trinamool Congress.
