= Vepris sansibarensis =

Conservation status
- Vulnerable (IUCN 2.3)

Scientific classification
- Kingdom: Plantae
- Clade: Tracheophytes
- Clade: Angiosperms
- Clade: Eudicots
- Clade: Rosids
- Order: Sapindales
- Family: Rutaceae
- Genus: Vepris
- Species: V. sansibarensis

Binomial name
- Vepris sansibarensis (Engl.) Mziray

Synonyms
- Toddalia sansibarensis Engl.; Toddaliopsis sansibarensis (Engl.) Engl.

Species of flowering plant

Vepris sansibarensis is a species of plant in the family Rutaceae. It is found in Kenya and Tanzania.
