= Mahabali (disambiguation) =

Mahabali is a benevolent Asura king from Hindu mythology.

Mahabali may also refer to:

== Mythology ==
- Mahabali, a Shaiva demon defeated by goddess Durga, after whom the temple of Mahabaleswar in Maharashtra state is known
- Mahabali, a disciple of Dirghatamas
- Mahabali Umang, a name for Hanuman in Manipur

== Other uses ==
- Mahabali (film), a 1983 Indian Malayalam-language film
- Alludu Seenu, 2014 Indian Telugu-language film, titled Mahabali in Hindi
- Mahabali Singh (born 1950), Indian MP
- Mahabali Shera (born 1990), Indian wrestler

== See also ==
- Bali (disambiguation)
- Hanuman (disambiguation)
