= Bali Dewanganj =

- Village
- Location in West Bengal, India Bali Dewanganj (India)
- Coordinates: 22.81224°N 87.76836°E
- Country: India
- State: West Bengal
- District: Hooghly

Population (2011)
  - Total: 4,063

Languages
  - Official: Bengali, English
- Time zone: UTC+5:30 (IST)
- PIN: 712616
- Telephone/STD code: 03211
- Lok Sabha constituency: Arambagh
- Vidhan Sabha constituency: Goghat
- Website: hooghly.gov.in

Bali Dewanganj (also referred to as only Bali) is a village and a gram panchayat in the Goghat I CD block in the Arambagh subdivision of Hooghly district in the Indian state of West Bengal.

== Geography ==
Cities and towns in Arambagh subdivision in Hooghly district
M: municipal city/ town, R: rural/ urban centre, H: historical/ religious centre
Owing to space constraints in the small map, the actual locations in a larger map may vary slightly

=== Location ===
Bali Dewanganj is located at 22.81224°N 87.76836°E. It is 13 km from Arambagh on the Arambagh-Ghatal Road.

=== Area overview ===
The Arambagh subdivision, presented in the map alongside, is divided into two physiographic parts – the Dwarakeswar River being the dividing line. The western part is upland and rocky – it is extension of the terrain of neighbouring Bankura district. The eastern part is flat alluvial plain area. The railways, the roads and flood-control measures have had an impact on the area. The area is overwhelmingly rural with 94.77% of the population living in rural areas and 5.23% in urban areas.

Note: The map alongside presents some of the notable locations in the subdivision. All places marked in the map are linked in the larger full screen map.

== Demographics ==
As per the 2011 Census of India, Bali had a total population of 4,063 of which 2,093 (52%) were males and 1,970 (48%) were females. Population in the age range 0–6 years was 376. The total number of literate persons in Bali was 2,922 (79.25% of the population over 6 years).

== Culture ==
Bali Dewanganj is a temple town. The Rautpara neighbourhood alone has five temples, of which three are in a dilapidated condition. The Mangal Chandi temple is said to have had 13 pinnacles, and all of them have fallen. In the other two ruined temples one can still see one pinnacle each. The most important structure is the 200-years old Durga temple, maintained by the state archaeological department. It is a rare and unique structure, with a nava ratna superstructure placed on a Jor Bangla base. The Shiva kutir is another place in ruins. A ras mancha still has some terracotta decorations. The pictures in the gallery show a small selection of terracotta work in the different temples.

David J. McCutchion mentions:

- The Shiva Durga temple of Raut Family as a Jor Bangla with a nava ratna tower, measuring 21' 10" square, with terracotta on façade, built possibly in the 18th century.
- The Damodara temple of the Ghosh family, as a Midnapore type at chala, measuring 22' x 19' 6", built in 1822.
- The Vishnu temple of Raut Family at Rautpara as a pancha ratna with curved ridging to the turrets, with slight terracotta, measuring 22' 6" square.
- The Mangal Chandi temple, with rich terracotta decoration but ruined, is said to have had 13 turrets.

The temple of Shiva Durga at Bali Dewanganj (at Sr No S-WB-58) is included in the List of State Protected Monuments in West Bengal by the Archaeological Survey of India.

== Bali Dewanganj picture gallery ==
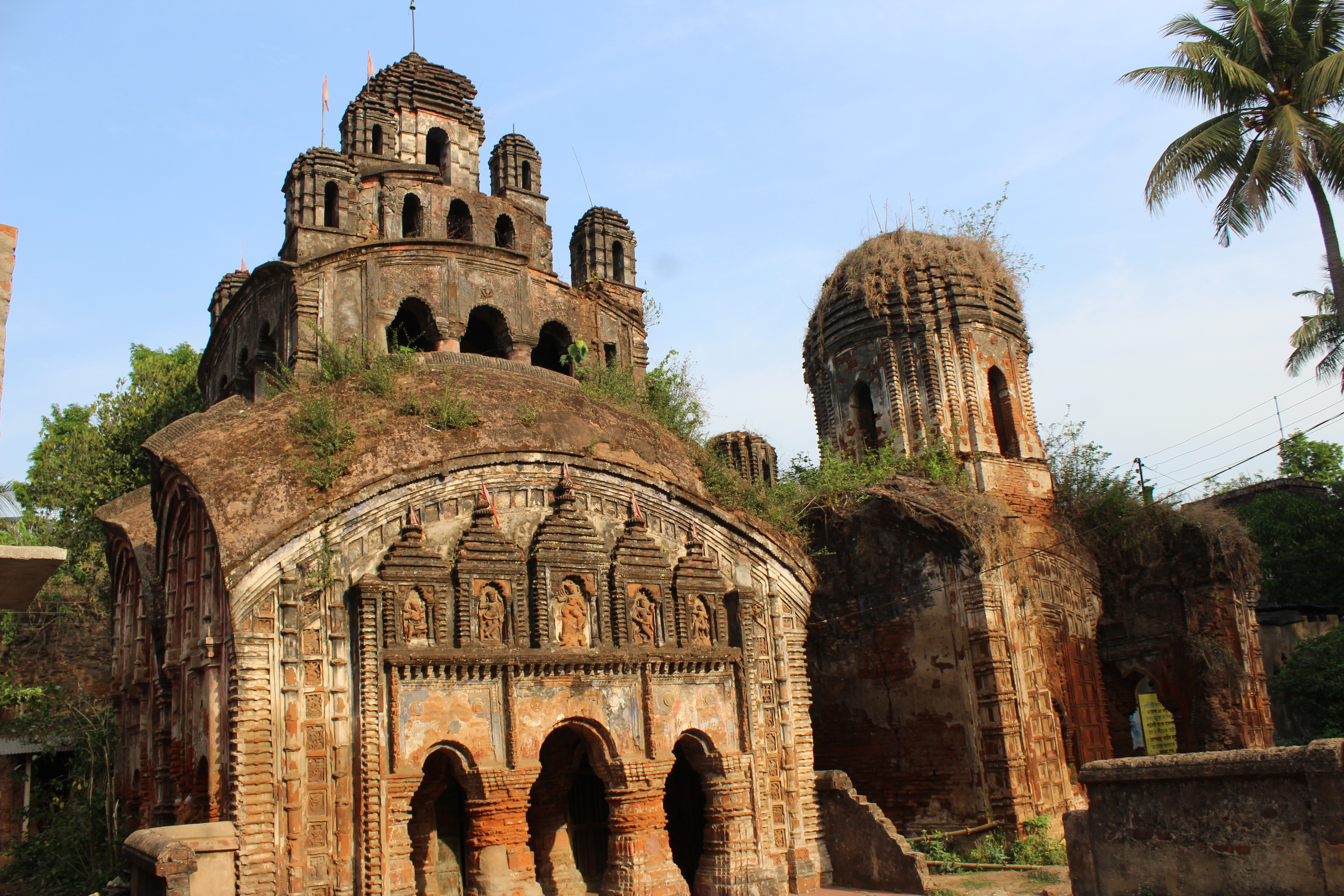
The Shiva Durga temple (or simply Durga temple) with the Vishnu temple in the background

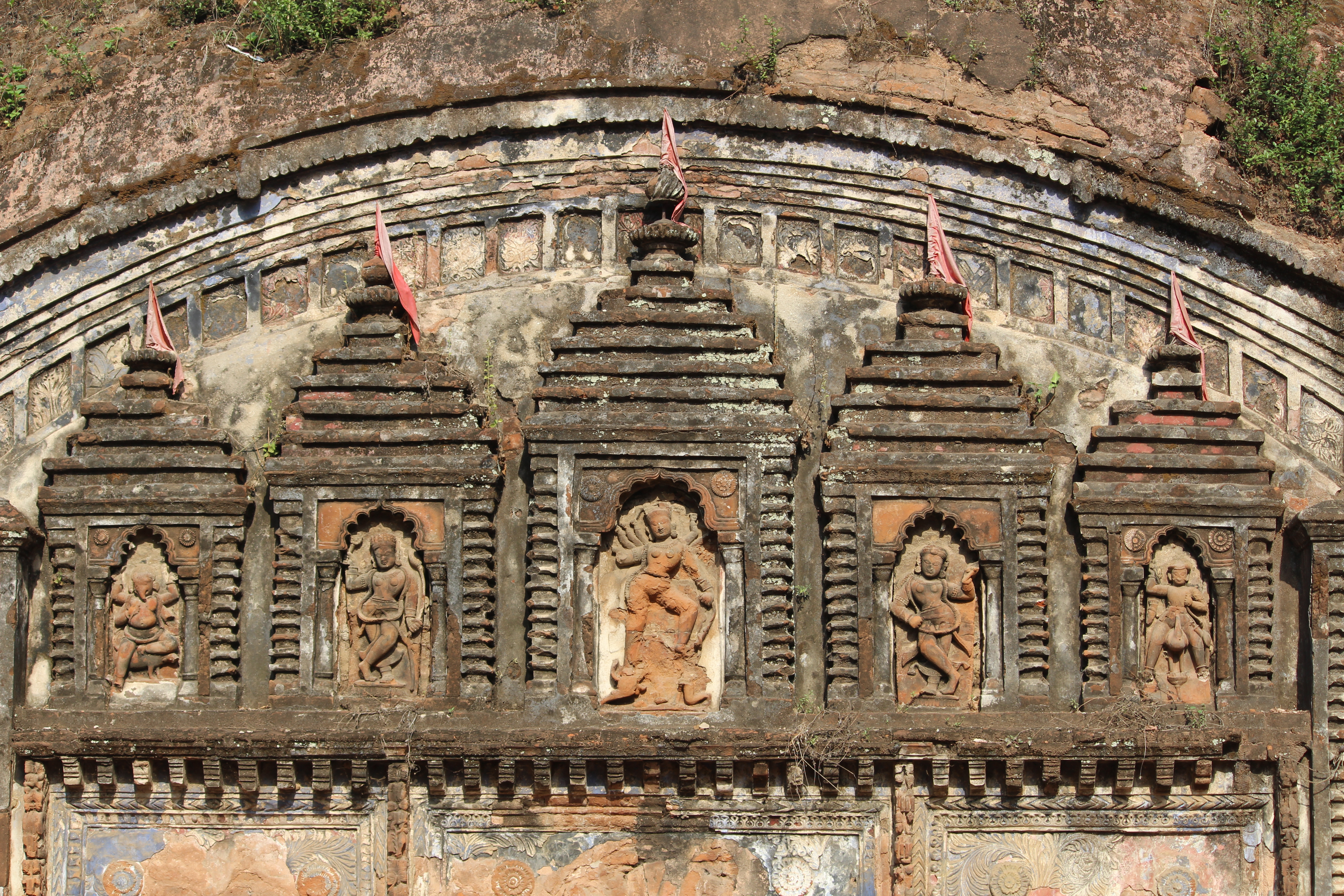
The massive terracotta panel in Shiva Durga temple

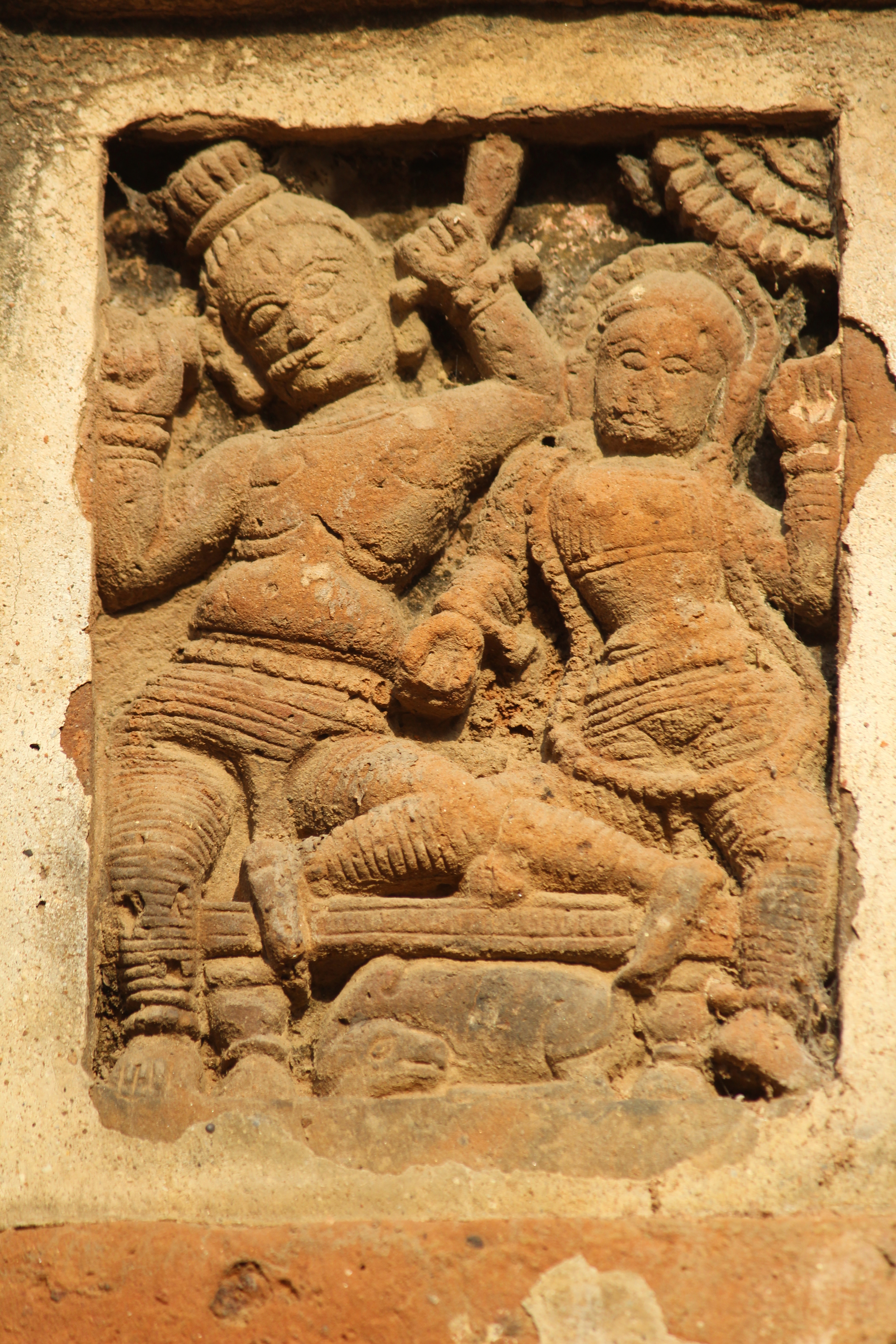
Terracotta panel in Shiva Durga temple

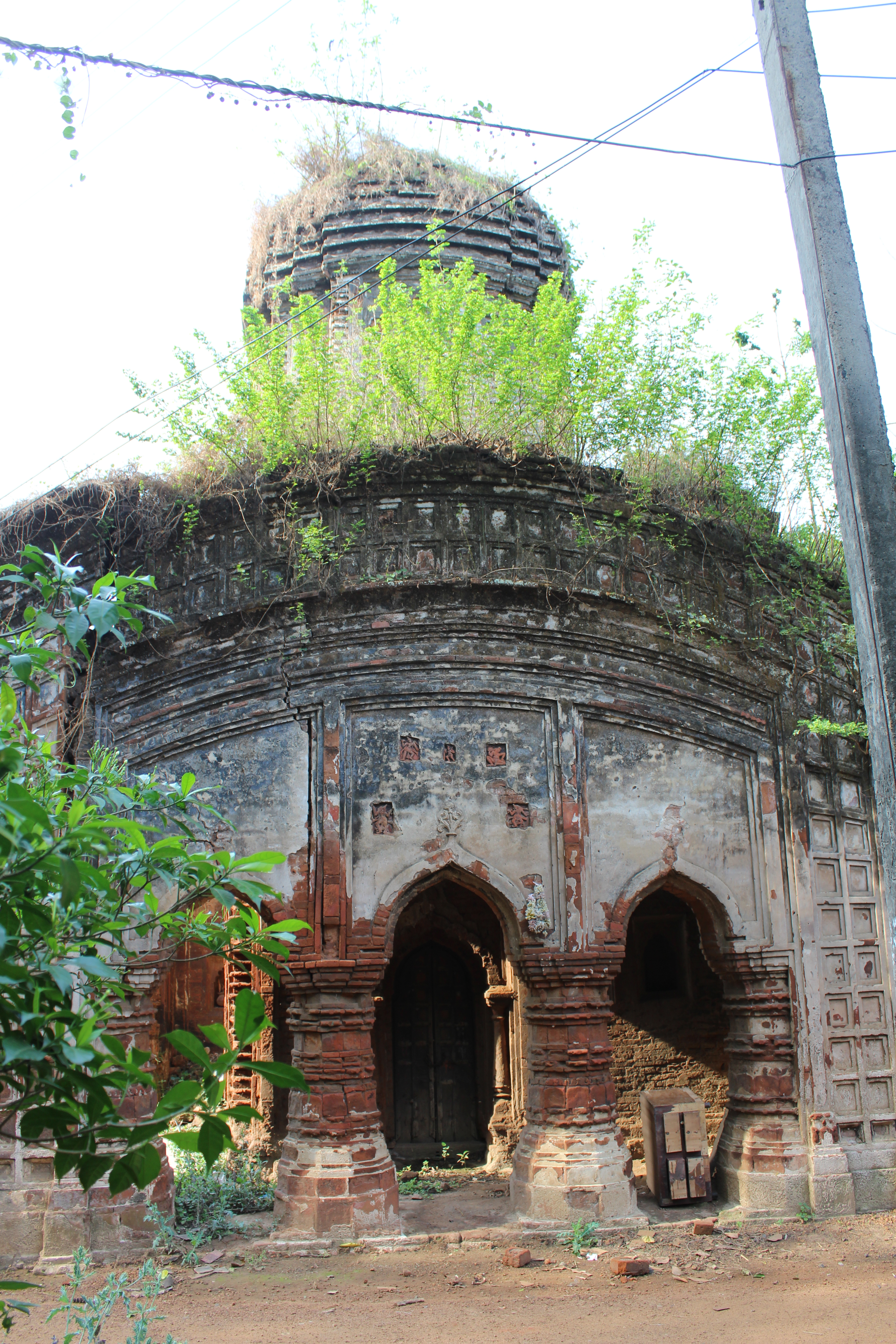
Vishnu temple in Rautpara

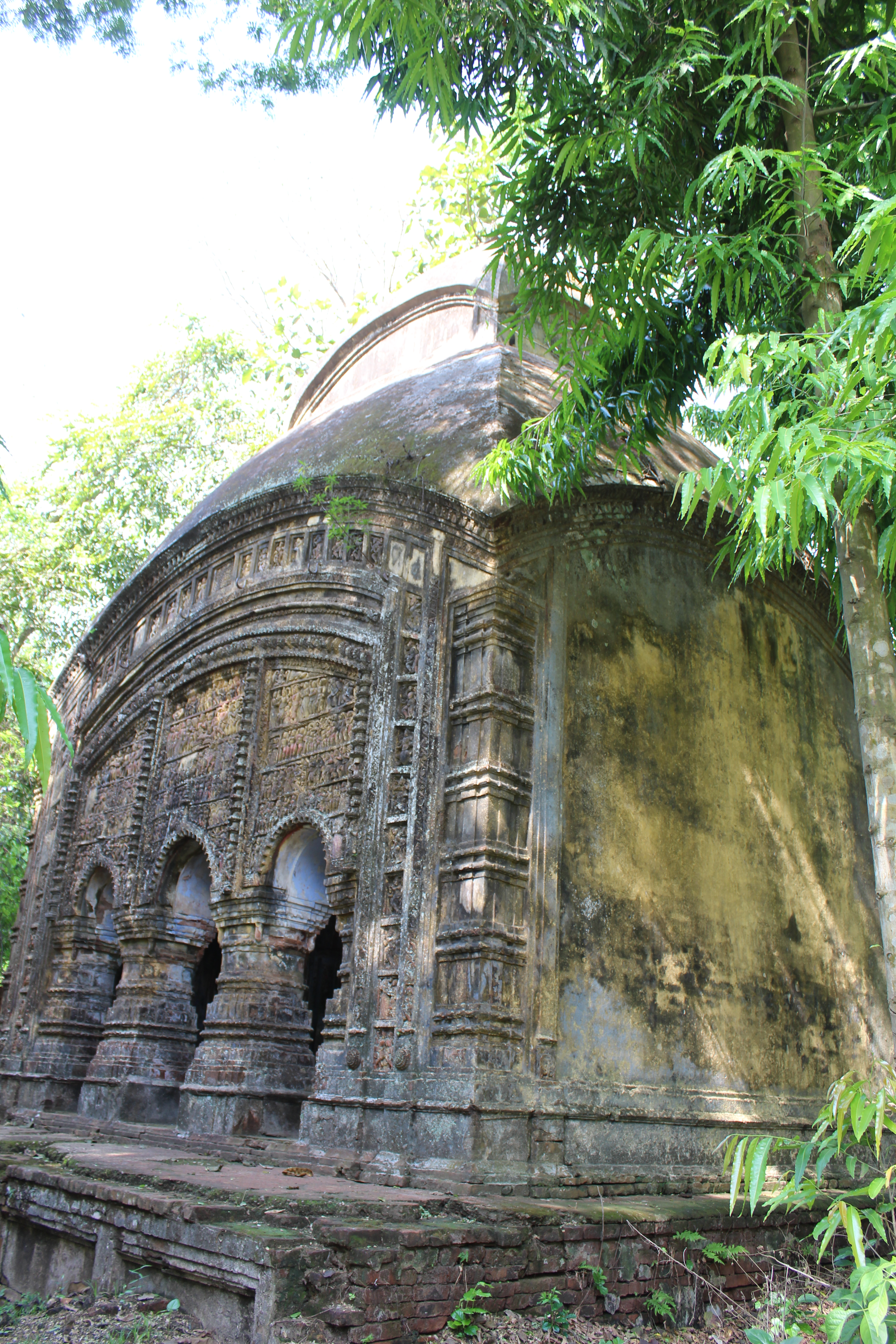
Damodar temple of Ghosh family

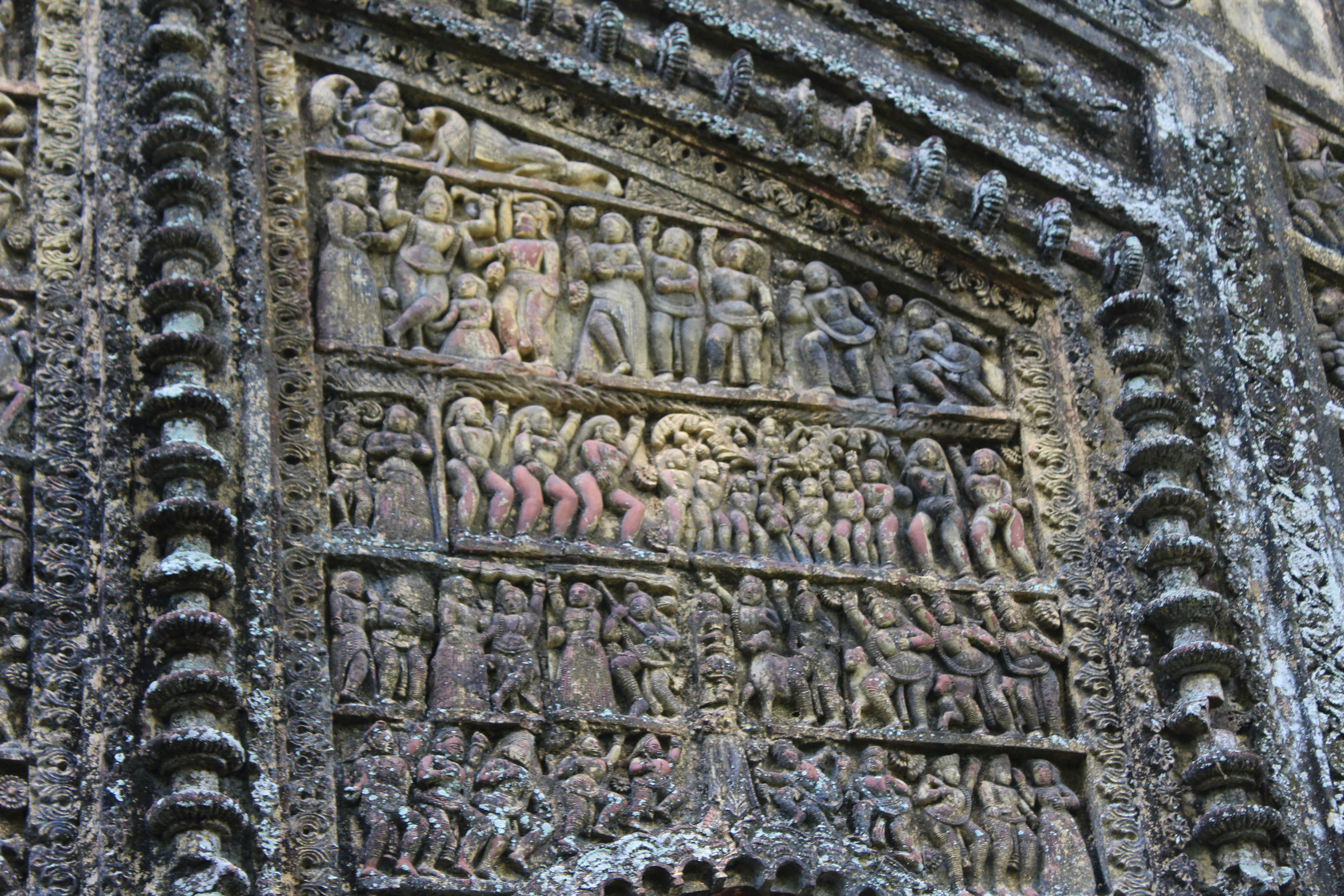
Terracotta relief in Damodar temple

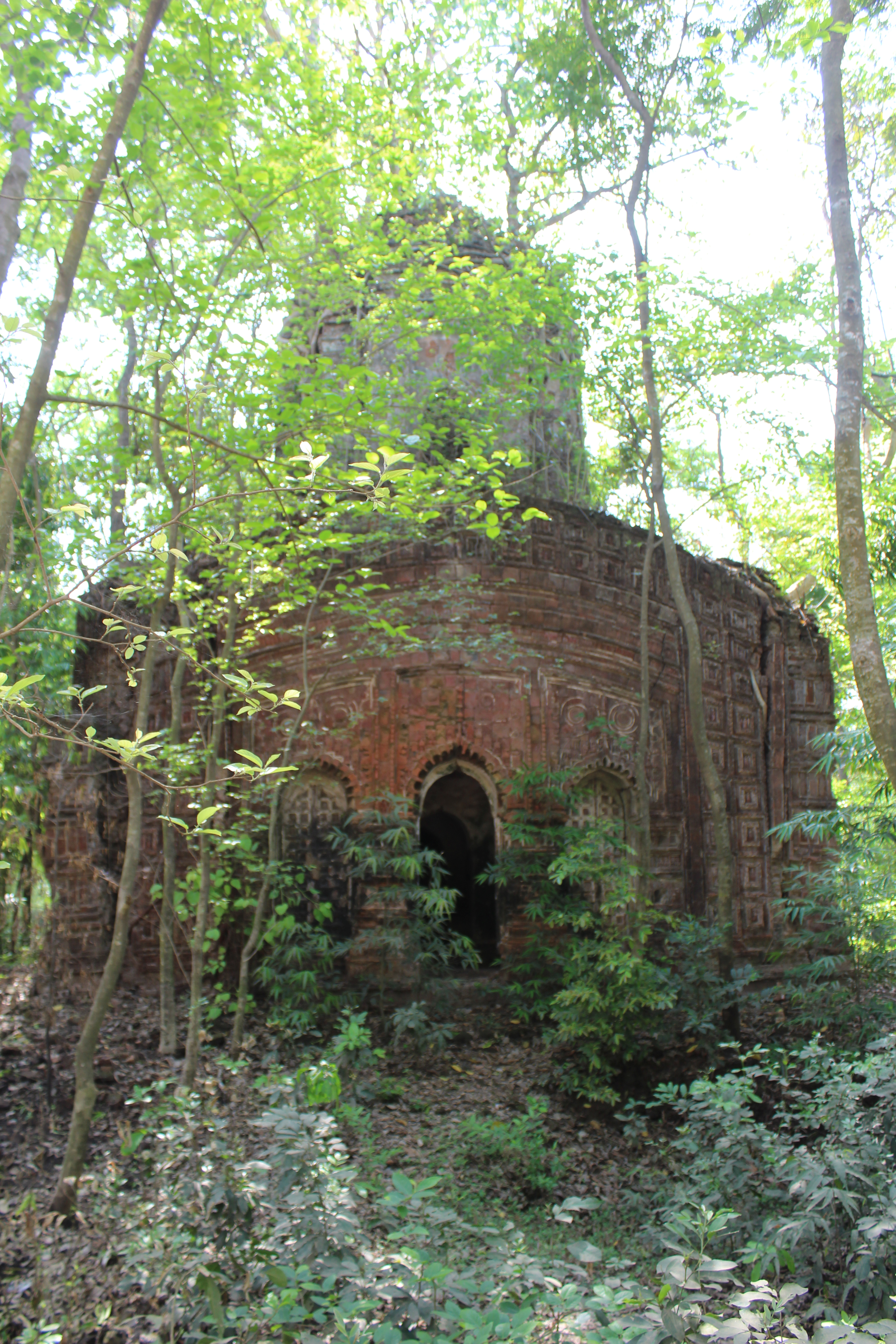
Lakshmi Janardan temple at Dalapara in a dilapidated condition

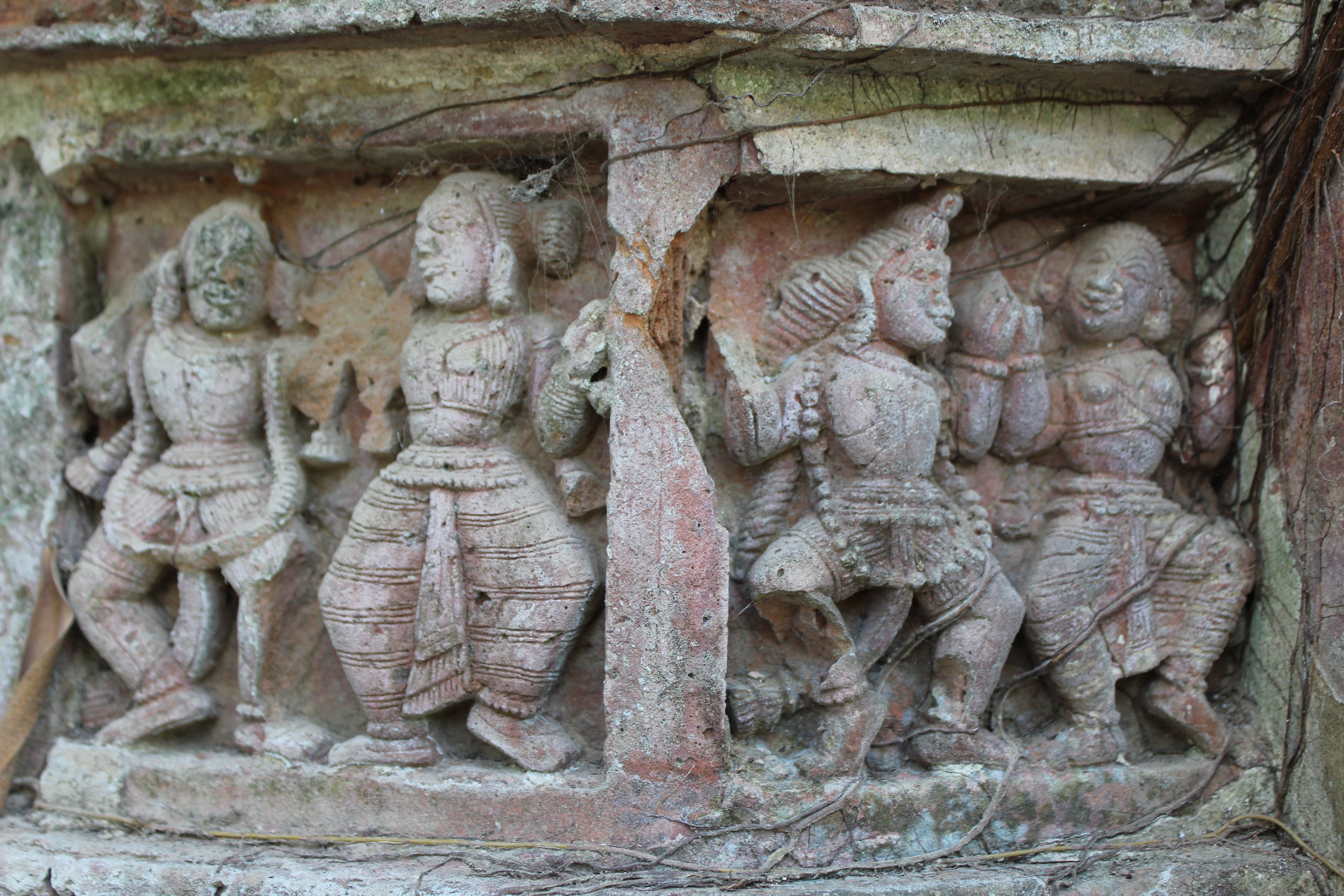
Terracotta relief in Lakshmi Janardan temple

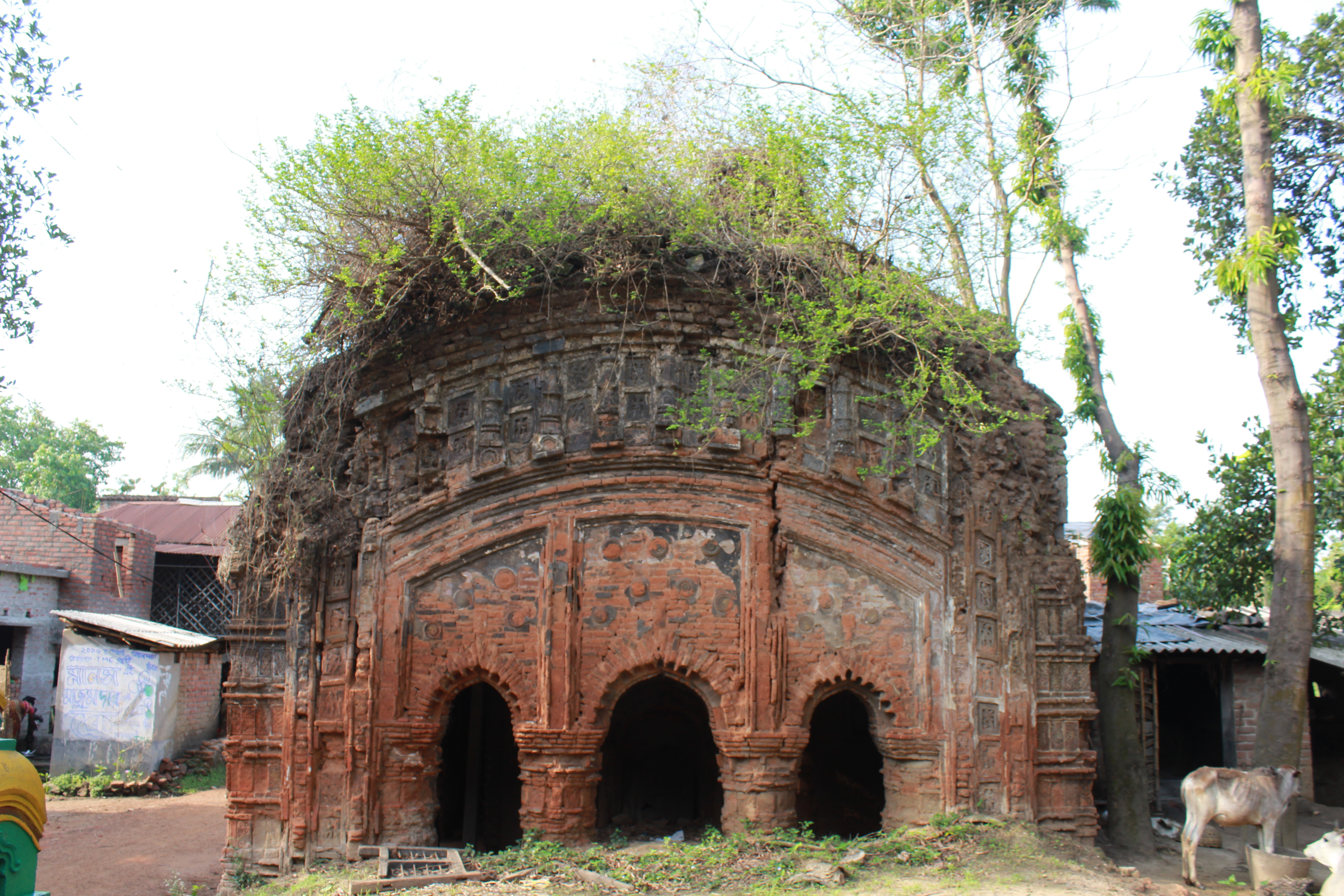
Magal Chandi temple at Rautpara. All 13 turrets are gone.

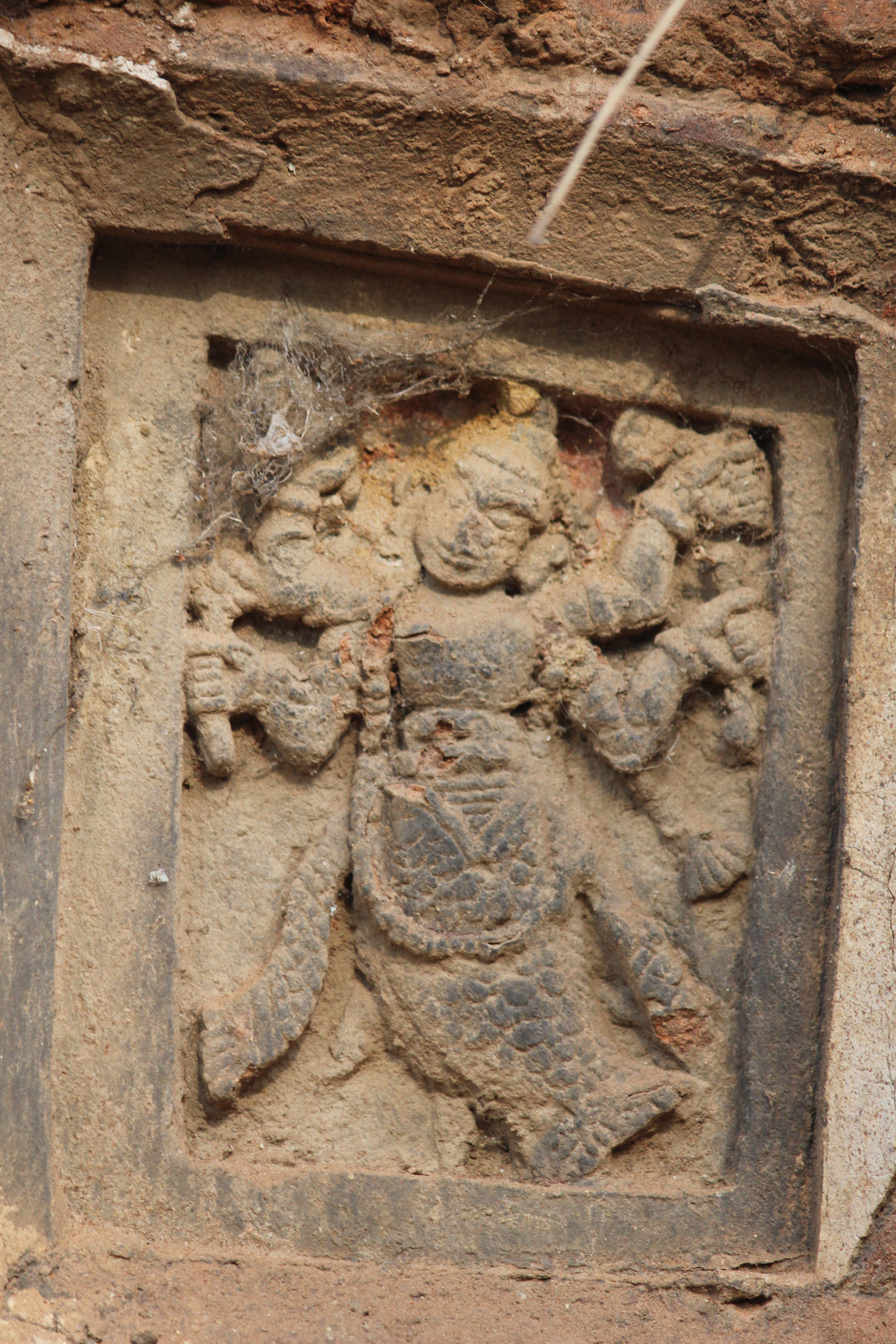
Terracotta relief in Mangal Chandi Temple

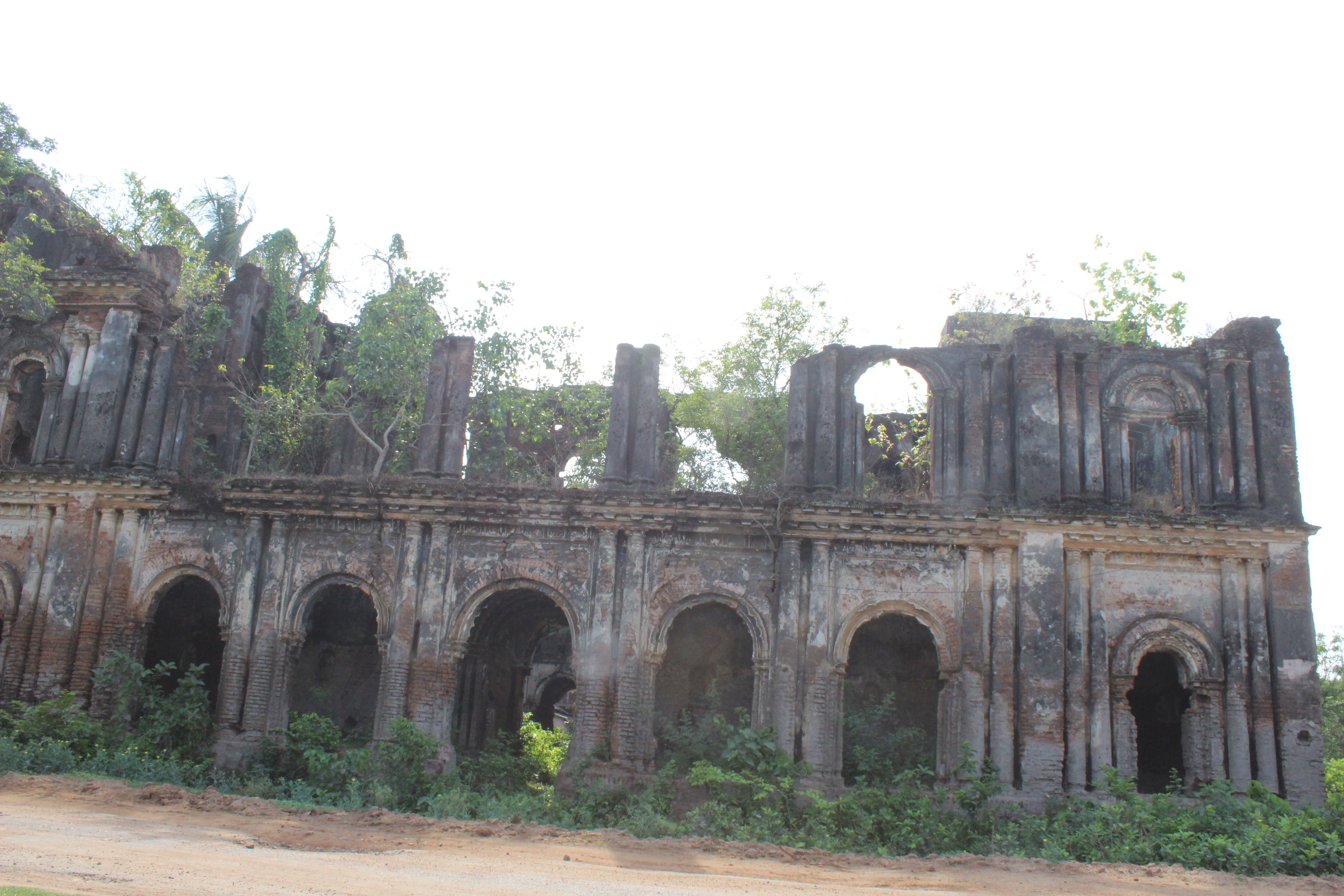
Shib kuthi

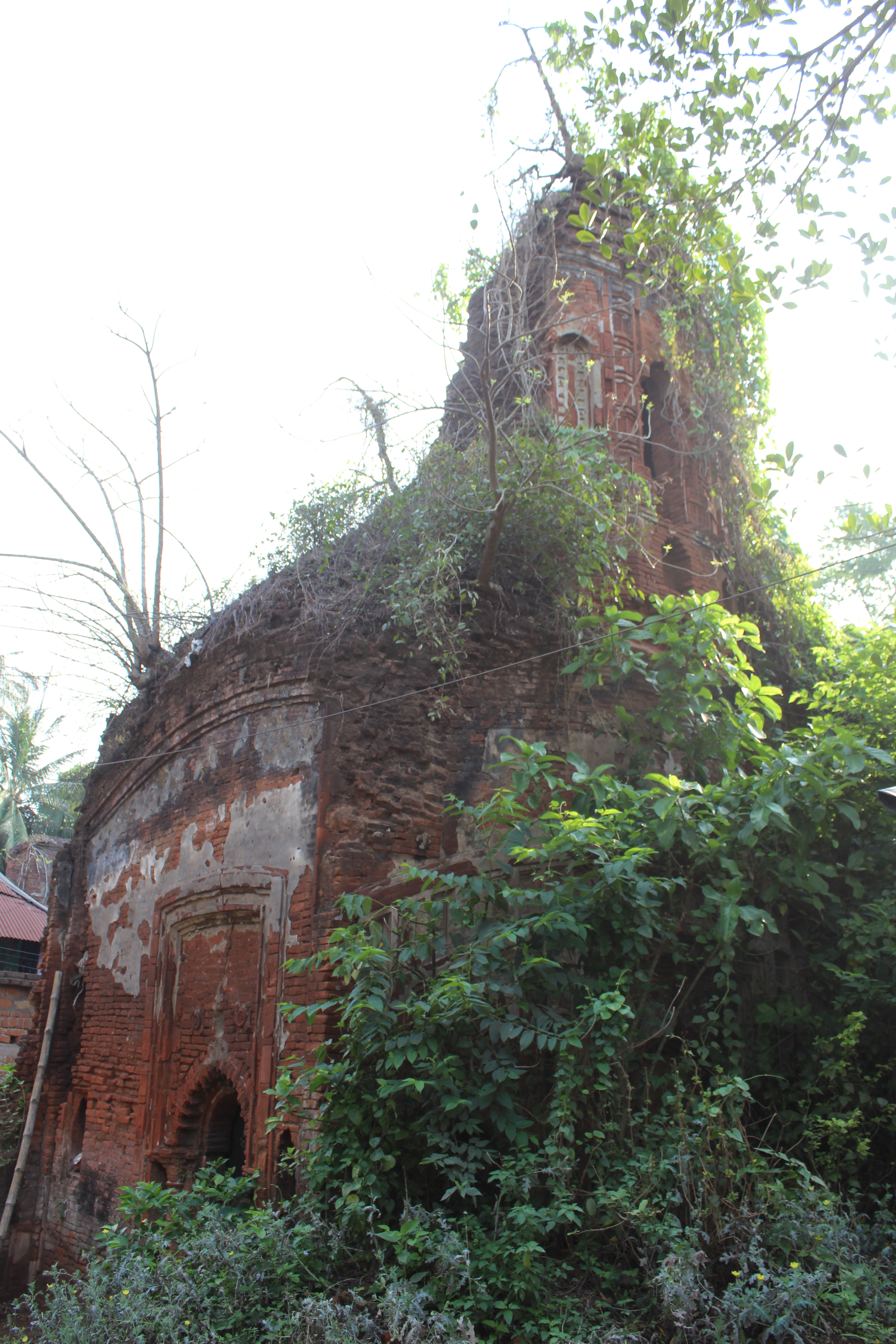
Durga temple of Das family at Rautpara

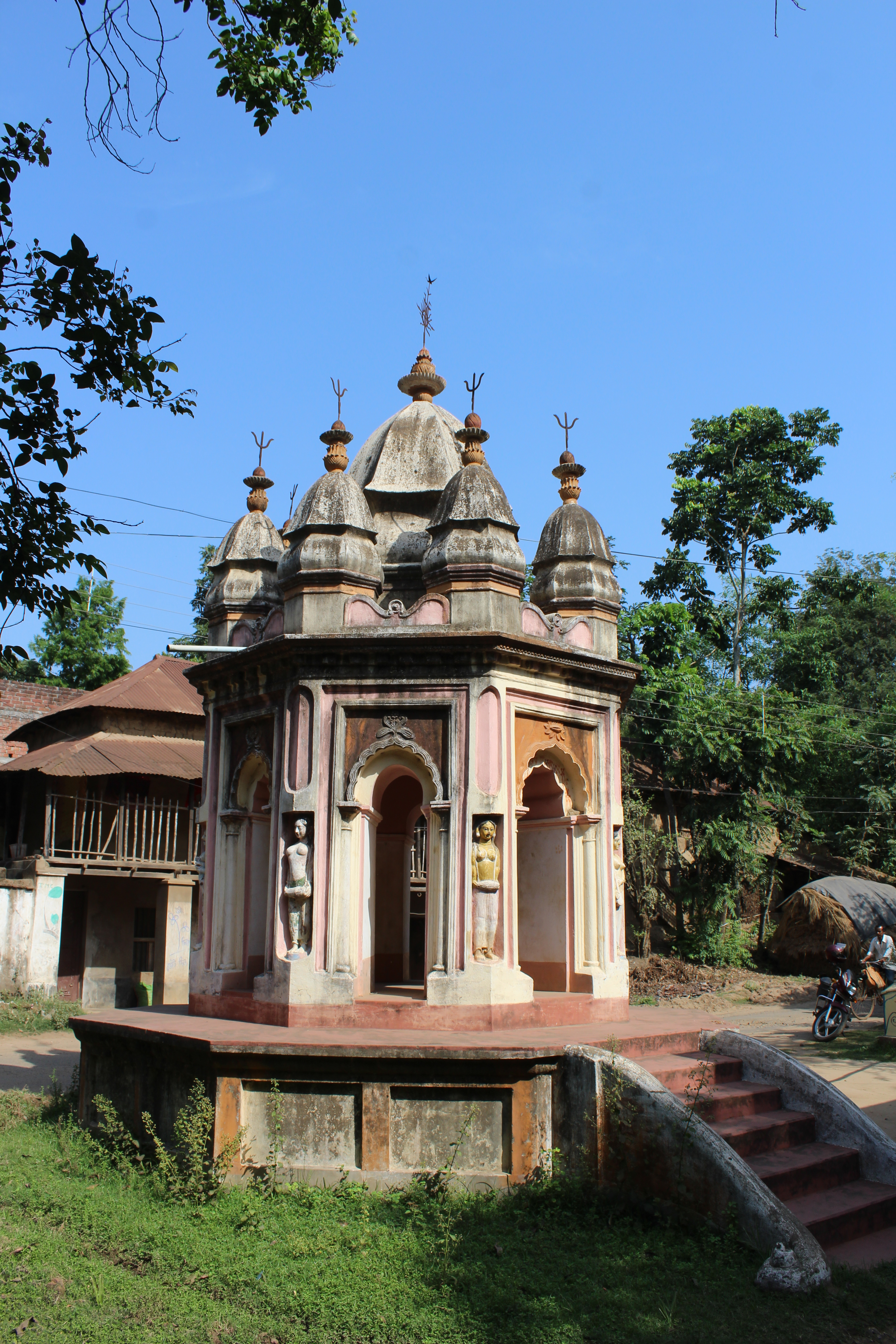
Rasa Mancha

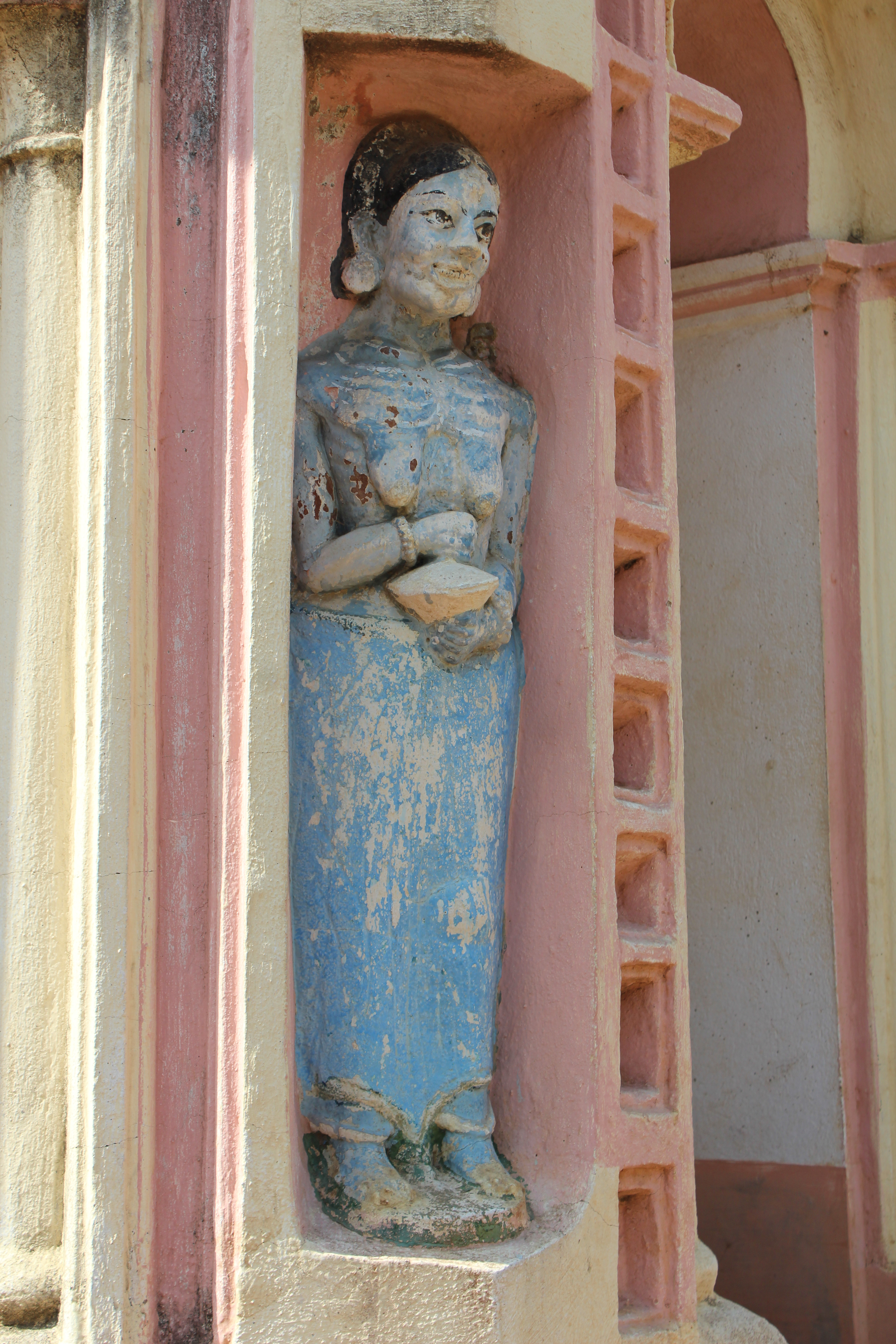
One of the many decorative pieces in Rasa Mancha
