= Vepris arushensis =

Conservation status
- Vulnerable (IUCN 2.3)

Scientific classification
- Kingdom: Plantae
- Clade: Tracheophytes
- Clade: Angiosperms
- Clade: Eudicots
- Clade: Rosids
- Order: Sapindales
- Family: Rutaceae
- Genus: Vepris
- Species: V. arushensis

Binomial name
- Vepris arushensis Kokwaro

Species of flowering plant

Vepris arushensis is a species of plant in the family Rutaceae. It is endemic to Arusha Region of Tanzania.
