= Vepris suaveolens =

Conservation status
- Near Threatened (IUCN 2.3)

Scientific classification
- Kingdom: Plantae
- Clade: Tracheophytes
- Clade: Angiosperms
- Clade: Eudicots
- Clade: Rosids
- Order: Sapindales
- Family: Rutaceae
- Genus: Vepris
- Species: V. suaveolens

Binomial name
- Vepris suaveolens (Engl.) Mziray

Synonyms
- Oricia leonensis Engl.; Oricia suaveolens (Engl.) I.Verd.; Teclea suaveolens Engl.

Species of flowering plant

Vepris suaveolens, synonym Oricia suaveolens, is a species of plant in the family Rutaceae. It is found in Cameroon, the Central African Republic, the Democratic Republic of the Congo, Ivory Coast, Ghana, Guinea, Liberia, Nigeria, and Sierra Leone. It is threatened by habitat loss.
