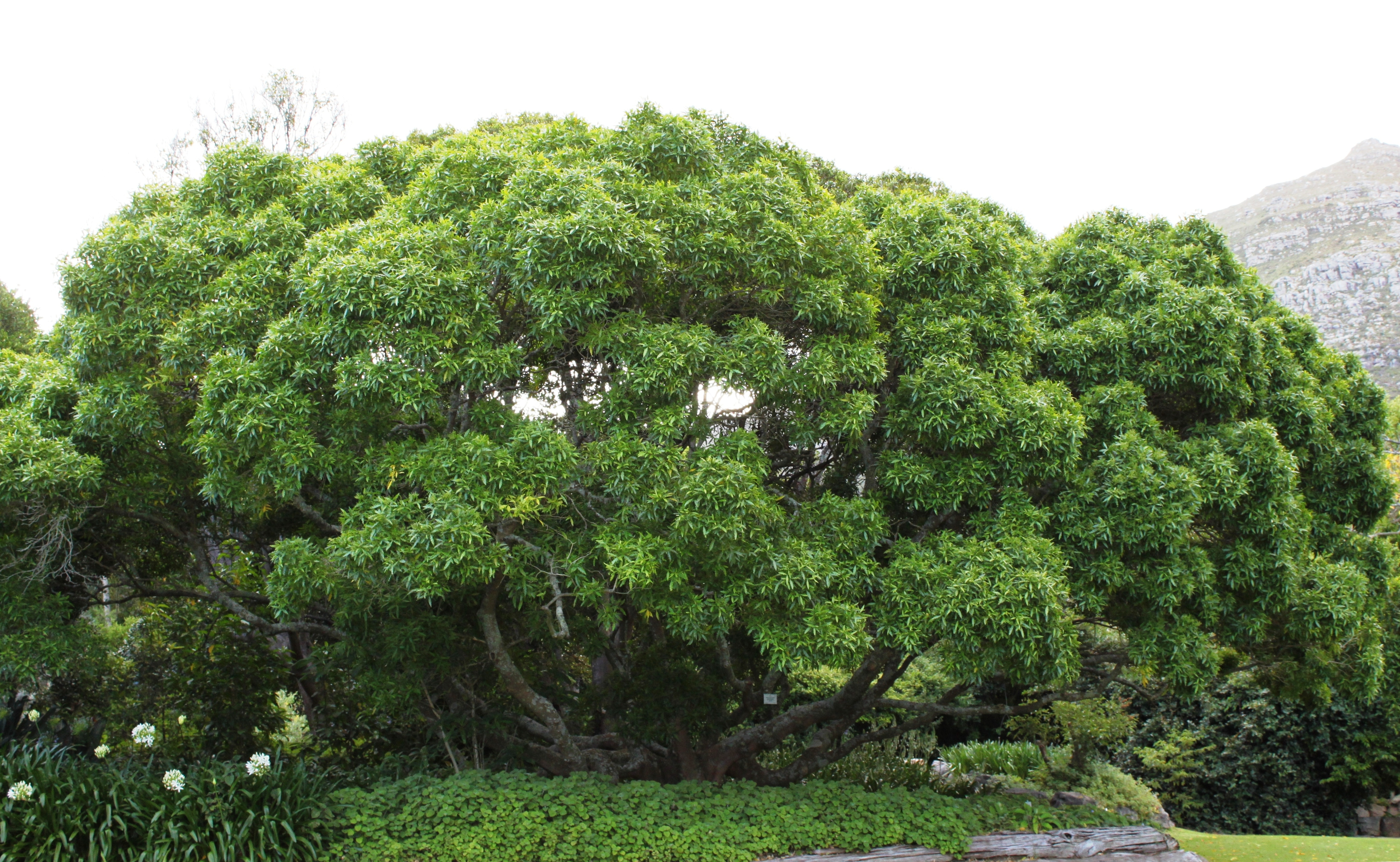

Scientific classification
- Kingdom: Plantae
- Clade: Tracheophytes
- Clade: Angiosperms
- Clade: Eudicots
- Clade: Rosids
- Order: Sapindales
- Family: Rutaceae
- Genus: Vepris
- Species: V. lanceolata

Binomial name
- Vepris lanceolata (Lam.) G.Don (1831)

Synonyms
- Asaphes undulata DC. (1825); Boscia undulata Thunb. (1813); Cranzia lanceolata (Lam.) Kuntze (1891); Cranzia paniculata (Lam.) Kuntze (1891); Duncania undulata (Thunb.) Rchb. ex Steud. (1840); Myrica trifoliata L. (1760); Scopolia inermi Willd. (1798); Scopolia lanceolata (Lam.) F.Dietr. (1821); Scopolia paniculata (Lam.) Spreng. (1824); Toddalia inermis (Willd.) Pers. (1805); Toddalia lanceolata Lam. (1797); Toddalia paniculata Lam. (1797); Toddalia trifoliata (L.) Druce (1913 publ. 1914); Vepris inermis (Willd.) Comm. ex A Juss. (1825); Vepris obovata G.Don (1831), nom. superfl.; Vepris paniculata (Lam.) Engl. (1896); Vepris querimbensis Klotzsch (1861); Vepris undulata (Thunb.) I.Verd. & C.A.Sm. (1951); Zanthoxylum undulatum Wall. (1829), not validly publ.

= Vepris lanceolata =

Species of tree

Vepris lanceolata (umZane or white ironwood) is a large, evergreen tree native to southern and eastern Africa. It ranges from southeastern Kenya through Tanzania and Mozambique to South Africa, where it grows in coastal evergreen thicket or on loose sandy soil near beaches from sea level to 30 meters elevation.

== Pictures ==
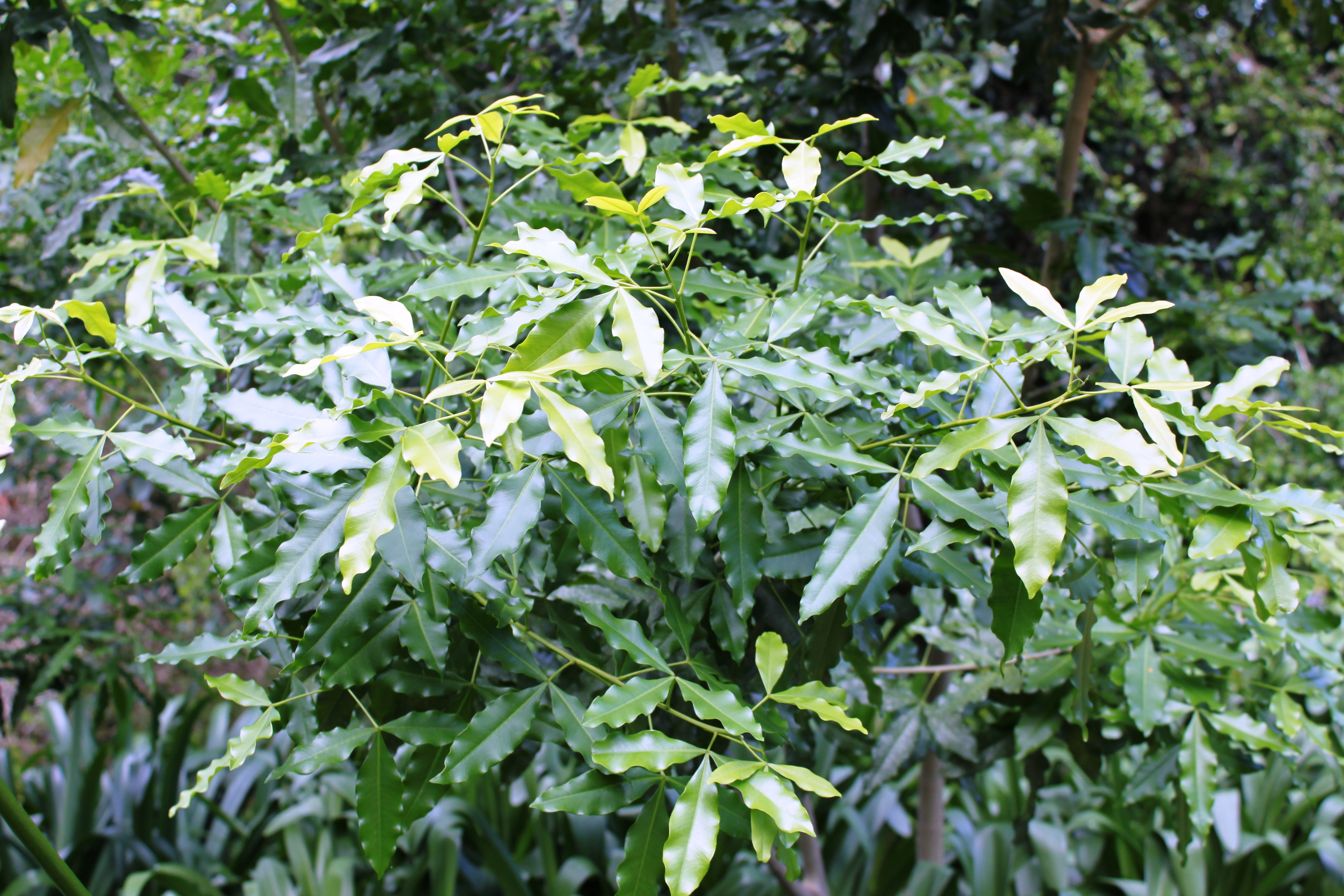
Detail of foliage.
