= Vepris lecomteana =

Conservation status
- Vulnerable (IUCN 3.1)

Scientific classification
- Kingdom: Plantae
- Clade: Tracheophytes
- Clade: Angiosperms
- Clade: Eudicots
- Clade: Rosids
- Order: Sapindales
- Family: Rutaceae
- Genus: Vepris
- Species: V. lecomteana

Binomial name
- Vepris lecomteana (Pierre) Cheek & T.Heller

Synonyms
- Oricia lecomteana Pierre

Species of flowering plant

Vepris lecomteana, synonym Oricia lecomteana, is a species of plant in the family Rutaceae. It is found in Cameroon, the Republic of the Congo, Gabon and Nigeria. Its natural habitat is subtropical or tropical moist lowland forests. It is threatened by habitat loss.
