= Goghat I =

- Community development block
- Interactive map of Goghat I
- Coordinates: 22.875244°N 87.703736°E
- Country: India
- State: West Bengal
- District: Hooghly

Government
  - Type: Representative democracy

Area
  - Total: 186.32 km^{2} (71.94 sq mi)
- Elevation: 16 m (52 ft)

Population (2011)
  - Total: 140,030
  - Density: 751.56/km^{2} (1,946.5/sq mi)

Languages
  - Official: Bengali, English
- Time zone: UTC+5:30 (IST)
- PIN: 712614 (Goghat, Nakunda and Raghubati GP), 712602(Bhadur and Raghubati GP), 712616(Saora, Kumursha and Bali GP)
- Area code: 03211
- ISO 3166 code: IN-WB
- Vehicle registration: WB-15, WB-16, WB-18
- Literacy: 78.70%
- Lok Sabha constituency: Arambagh
- Vidhan Sabha constituency: Goghat
- Website: hooghly.gov.in

Goghat I is a community development block that forms an administrative division in the Arambag subdivision of Hooghly district in the Indian state of West Bengal.

== Overview ==
The Goghat I CD Block is part of the western uplands, which is an extension of the rocky uneven physiography found in the adjoining Bankura district.

== Geography ==
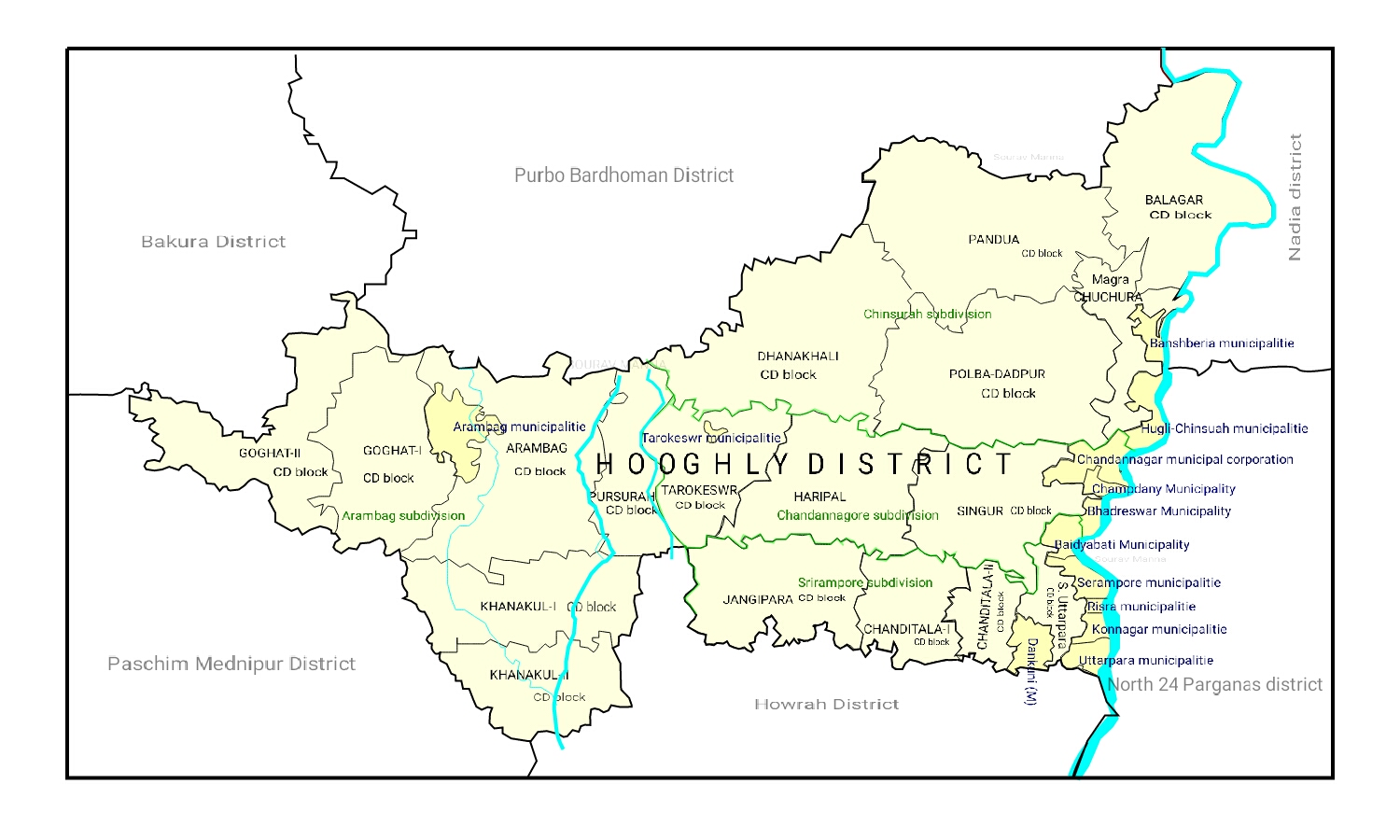
Map of Hooghly district showing CD blocks and municipal areas

Goghat CD block map Sowing GP areas

Goghat is located at 22°52′31″N 87°42′13″E.

Goghat I CD Block is bounded by the Raina II CD Block, in the Bardhaman district, in the north, the Arambagh CD Block in the east, the Chandrakona I and Ghatal CD Blocks, in the Paschim Medinipur district, in the south, and the Goghat II CD Block in the west.

It is located 82 km from Chinsurah, the district headquarters.

Goghat I CD Block has an area of 186.32 km^{2}. It has 1 panchayat samity, 7 gram panchayats, 107 gram sansads (village councils), 99 mouzas and 97 inhabited villages. Goghat police station serves this block. Headquarters of this CD Block is at Goghat.

Gram panchayats of Goghat I block/ panchayat samiti are: Bali, Bhadur, Goghat, Kumursha, Nakunda, Raghubati and Seorah.

== Demographics ==
=== Population ===
As per the 2011 Census of India, Goghat I CD Block had a total population of 140,030, all of which were rural. There were 71,804 (51%) males and 68,226 (49%) females. Population below 6 years was 14,581. Scheduled Castes numbered 54,321 (38.79%) and Scheduled Tribes numbered 8,415 (6.01%).

As per the 2001 census, Goghat I block had a total population of 125,277, out of which 64,162 were males and 61,115 were females. Goghat I block registered a population growth of 14.36 per cent during the 1991-2001 decade. Decadal growth for Hooghly district was 15.72 per cent. Decadal growth in West Bengal was 17.84 per cent.

Large villages (with 4,000+ population) in Goghat I CD Block are (2011 census figures in brackets): Goghat (5,495), Kumursa (4,449), Nakunda (4,228), Saora (4,290), Syamballabpur (4,985) and Bali (4,063).

Other villages in Goghat I CD Block include (2011 census figures in brackets): Bhadur (2,898), Raghunathbati (1,785), Mandalghanti(1627) and Adra(481)

=== Literacy ===
As per the 2011 census the total number of literates in Goghat I CD Block was 98,732 (78.70% of the population over 6 years) out of which males numbered 55,063 (85.64% of the male population over 6 years) and females numbered 43,669 (71.41% of the female population over 6 years). The gender disparity (the difference between female and male literacy rates) was 14.24%.

As per the 2001 census, Goghat I block had a total literacy of 51.15 per cent. While male literacy was 72.72 per cent, female literacy was 40.69 per cent.

See also – List of West Bengal districts ranked by literacy rate

Literacy in CD blocks of
Hooghly district
Arambagh subdivision
Arambagh – 79.10
Khanakul I – 77.73
Khanakul II – 79.16
Goghat I – 78.70
Goghat II – 77.24
Pursurah – 82.12
Chandannagar subdivision
Haripal – 78.59
Singur – 84.01
Tarakeswar – 79.96
Chinsurah subdivision
Balagarh – 76.94
Chinsurah Mogra – 83.01
Dhaniakhali – 75.66
Pandua – 75.86
Polba Dadpur – 75.14
Srirampore subdivision
Chanditala I – 83.76
Chanditala II – 84.78
Jangipara – 75.34
Sreerampur Uttarpara – 87.33
Source: 2011 Census: CD Block Wise
Primary Census Abstract Data

=== Language and religion ===
Religion in Goghat I CD block (2011)
Hinduism	89.71%
Islam	9.75%
Other or not stated	0.54%

As per the 2011 census, majority of the population of the district belong to the Hindu community with a population share of 82.9% followed by Muslims at 15.8%. The percentage of the Hindu population of the district has followed a decreasing trend from 87.1% in 1961 to 82.9% in the latest census 2011. On the other hand, the percentage of Muslim population has increased from 12.7% in 1961 to 15.8% in 2011 census.

In the 2011 census Hindus numbered 125,620 and formed 89.71% of the population in Goghat I CD Block. Muslims numbered 13,655 and formed 9.75% of the population. Others numbered 755 and formed 0.54% of the population.

Languages of Goghat I block (2011)
1. Bengali (95.2%)
2. Santali (4.71%)
3. Others (0.08%)

At the time of the 2011 census, 95.21% of the population spoke Bengali and 4.71% Santali as their first language.

== Rural poverty ==
As per poverty estimates obtained from household survey for families living below poverty line in 2005, rural poverty in Goghat I CD Block was 29.97%.

== Economy ==
=== Livelihood ===
Livelihood
in Goghat I CD Block
1. Cultivators (27.9%)
2. Agricultural labourers (41.7%)
3. Household industries (3.18%)
4. Other Workers (27.3%)

In Goghat I CD Block in 2011, amongst the class of total workers, cultivators formed 27.87%, agricultural labourers 41.68%, household industry workers 3.18% and other workers 27.28%.

=== Infrastructure ===
There are 97 inhabited villages in Goghat I CD Block. 100% villages have power supply. 59 villages have more than one source of drinking water (tap, well, tube well, hand pump), 2 villages have only tube well/ borewell and 31 villages have only hand pump. 11 villages have post offices, 5 villages have sub post offices and 3 villages have post and telegraph offices. 63 villages have landlines, 40 villages have public call offices and 80 villages have mobile phone coverage. 48 villages have pucca roads and 51 villages have bus service (public/ private). 33 villages have agricultural credit societies and 7 villages have commercial/ co-operative banks.

Important Handicrafts of Hooghly District
- Zari Work on Sari - Pandua, Pursurah, Jangipara, Tarakeswar and other blocks - 3,000 families involved
- Chikon Embroidery – Babnan, Pandua, Singur - 2,500 families involved
- Silk and Cotton Printing – Serampore (Chanditala) - 300 families involved
- Brass and Bell Metal – Manikpat, Goghat, Arambagh - 150 families involved
- Conch Shell – Pandua, Khanakul, Makla, Chandannagar
- Jute Diversified Product – Baidyabati, Mogra
- Terracota – Chinsurah, Chandannagar, Baidyabati, Mogra

Source:District Human Development Report 2010: Hooghly P. 67

=== Agriculture ===
This is a rich agricultural area with several cold storages. Though rice is the prime crop of the district, the agricultural economy largely depends on potato, jute, vegetables, and orchard products. Though potato is cultivated in all the blocks of this district Dhaniakhali, Arambagh, Goghat, Pursurah, Haripal, Polba-Dadpur, Tarakeswar, Pandua and Singur contributed much of its production of this district.

Some of the primary and other hats or markets in the Goghat I and Goghat II CD Blocks are: Amar hat, Baddangang hat, Bengali market, Ballihat, Goghat market, Hazipur hat, Khatul hat, Kamarpukur, Madina market, Shyambazar hat, Shyamballabhpur market, Badanganj hat and Dewagang hat.

The Tebhaga movement launched in 1946, in 24 Parganas district, aimed at securing for the share-croppers a better position within the existing land relation structure. Although the subsequent Bargadari Act of 1950 recognised the rights of bargadars to a higher share of crops from the land that they tilled, it was not implemented fully. Large tracts, beyond the prescribed limit of land ceiling, remained with the rich landlords. From 1977 onwards major land reforms took place in West Bengal. Land in excess of land ceiling was acquired and distributed amongst the peasants. Following land reforms land ownership pattern has undergone transformation. In 2013-14, persons engaged in agriculture in Goghat I CD Block could be classified as follows: bargadars 8.12%, patta (document) holders 17.96%, small farmers (possessing land between 1 and 2 hectares) 3.00%, marginal farmers (possessing land up to 1 hectare) 26.26% and agricultural labourers 44.65%.

Goghat I CD Block had 69 fertiliser depots, 8 seed stores and 44 fair price shops in 2013-14.

In 2013-14, Goghat I CD Block produced 34,577 tonnes of Aman paddy, the main winter crop from 12,992 hectares, 17,589 tonnes of Boro paddy (spring crop) from 5,491 hectares, 3,063 tonnes of Aus paddy (summer crop) from 1,170hectares and 84,730 tonnes of potatoes from 4,724 hectares. It also produced oilseeds .

In 2013-14, the total area irrigated in Goghat I and Goghat II CD Blocks was 27,605 hectares, out of which 10,300 hectares were irrigated by canal water, 4,270 hectares by tank water, 870 hectares by river lift irrigation, 840 hectares by deep tube wells and 11,325 hectares by shallow tube wells.

=== Banking ===
In 2013-14, Goghat I CD Block had offices of 6 commercial banks and 2 gramin bank.

== Transport ==
Goghat I CD Block has 3 ferry services and 7 originating/ terminating bus routes.

EMU services, earlier operating from Howrah to Tarakeswar, was extended to Goghat railway station, after completion of the electrified broad gauge Tarakewar-Goghat sector of the Tarakeswar-Bishnupur extension of the Sheoraphuli–Bishnupur branch line.

It is part of Kolkata Suburban Railway system.

State Highway 2 (West Bengal) running from Bankura to Malancha (in North 24 Parganas district) passes through this CD Block.

From Arambagh bus stand many buses go directly to Goghat.

== Education ==
In 2013-14, Goghat I CD Block had 127 primary schools with 9,226 students, 7 middle schools with 1,060 students, 14 high schools with 8,200 students and 9 higher secondary schools with 8,139 students. Goghat I CD Block had 243 institutions for special and non-formal education with 7,612 students

In Goghat I CD Block, amongst the 97 inhabited villages, 6 villages had no school, 44 villages had more than 1 primary school, 55 villages had at least 1 primary school, 36 villages had at least 1 primary and 1 middle school and 25 villages had at least 1 middle and 1 secondary school.

== Culture ==
The Goghat I CD block has one prominent location with several heritage temples.

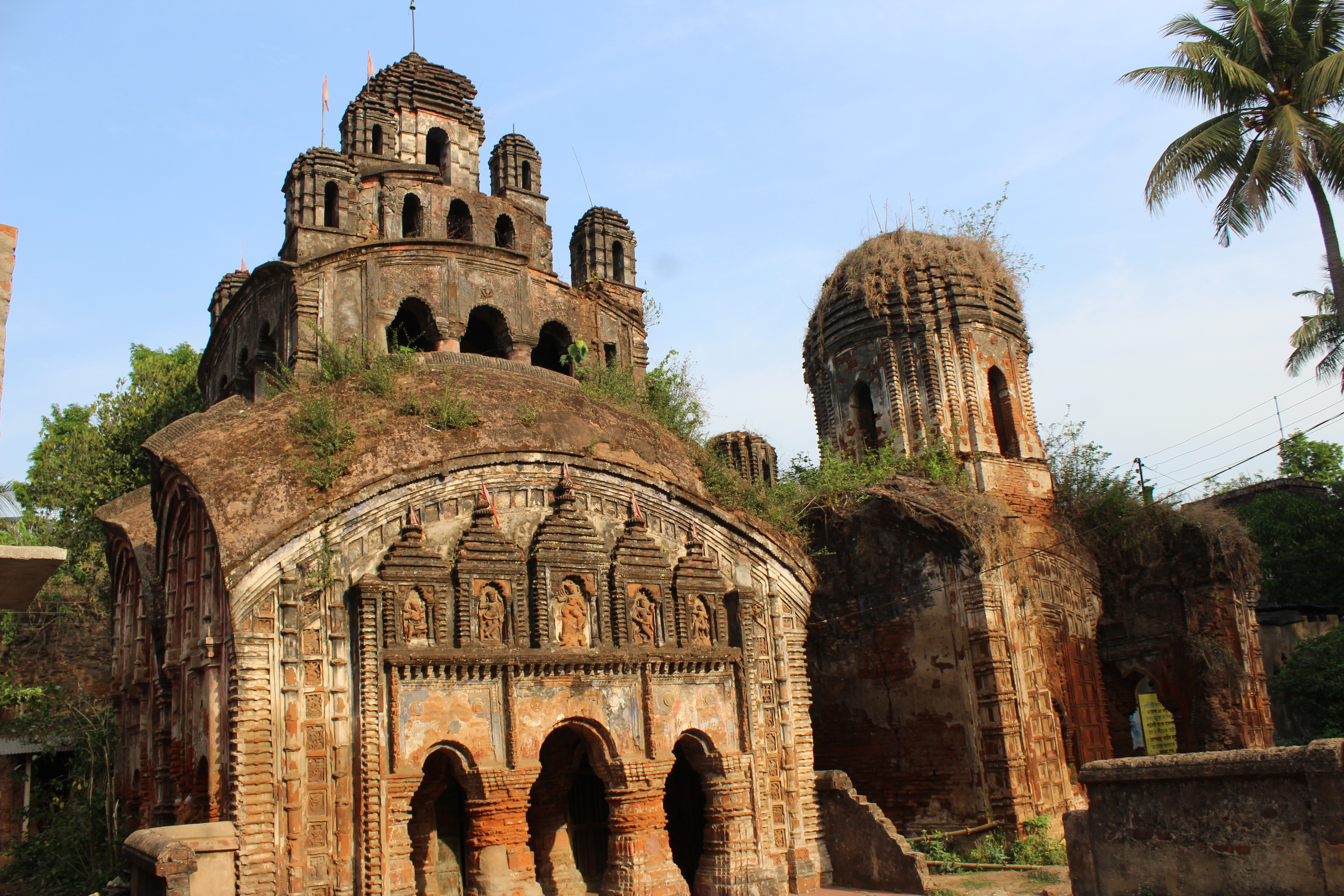

Bali Dewanganj: Shiva Durga temple (in picture), a Jor Bangla with a nava ratna tower, built in 19th century, Vishnu temple (partly in picture), Damodar temple, built in 1822, Lakshmi Janardan temple, Mangal Chandi temple and others, many with extensive terracotta design work.

== Healthcare ==
In 2014, Goghat I CD Block had 1 block primary health centre and 1 primary health centre with total 10 beds and 1 doctor (excluding private bodies). It had 22 family welfare subcentres. 1,397 patients were treated indoor and 148,051 patients were treated outdoor in the hospitals, health centres and subcentres of the CD Block.

Goghat I CD Block has Goghat Block Primary Health Centre (with 10 beds) at Goghat and Nakunda Primary Health Centre (with 6 beds).

Goghat I CD Block is one of the areas of Hooghly district where ground water is affected by moderate level of arsenic contamination. The WHO guideline for arsenic in drinking water is 10 mg/ litre, and the Indian Standard value is 50 mg/ litre. In Hooghly district, 16 blocks have arsenic levels above WHO guidelines and 11 blocks above Indian standard value. The maximum concentration in Goghat I CD Block is 147 mg/litre.
