= Vepris heterophylla =

Conservation status
- Endangered (IUCN 2.3)

Scientific classification
- Kingdom: Plantae
- Clade: Tracheophytes
- Clade: Angiosperms
- Clade: Eudicots
- Clade: Rosids
- Order: Sapindales
- Family: Rutaceae
- Genus: Vepris
- Species: V. heterophylla

Binomial name
- Vepris heterophylla (Engl.) Letouzey

Synonyms
- Teclea heterophylla Engl.; Toddaliopsis heterophylla (Engl.) Engl.; Teclea campestis Engl.; Teclea campestris Engl.; Teclea ferruginea A.Chev.; Teclea sudanica A.Chev.; Vepris sudanica (A.Chev.) Letouzey

Species of flowering plant

Vepris heterophylla is a species of flowering plant. Vepris heterophylla can be found in Ghana, Burkina Faso, Cameroon, Mali, and Nigeria, on the African continent. It usually occurs in the dry forest, on rocky hills in the savanna, and on hill slopes with granite boulders and along temporary river banks Vepris heterophylla is listed as an Endangered species according to IUCN Red List Classification due to habitat loss
