= Vepris glandulosa =

Conservation status
- Endangered (IUCN 3.1)

Scientific classification
- Kingdom: Plantae
- Clade: Tracheophytes
- Clade: Angiosperms
- Clade: Eudicots
- Clade: Rosids
- Order: Sapindales
- Family: Rutaceae
- Genus: Vepris
- Species: V. glandulosa

Binomial name
- Vepris glandulosa (Hoyle & Leakey) Kokwaro

Species of flowering plant

Vepris glandulosa is a species of plant in the family Rutaceae. It is endemic to Kenya. It is threatened by habitat loss.
