= Biswanath Karak =

Indian politician

Member of the West Bengal Legislative Assembly
- In office 2011–2016
- Preceded by: Niranjan Pandit
- Succeeded by: Manas Majumdar
- Constituency: Goghat
- In office 2 May 2021 – 4 May 2026
- Preceded by: Manas Majumdar
- Succeeded by: Prasanta Digar

Personal details
- Party: Bharatiya Janata Party
- Education: 12th Pass
- Profession: Cultivation

Biswanath Karak is an Indian politician from Bharatiya Janata Party. In May 2021, he was elected as a member of the West Bengal Legislative Assembly from Goghat (constituency). He defeated Manas Majumdar of All India Trinamool Congress by 4,147 votes in 2021 West Bengal Assembly election.

In 2011 West Bengal Assembly election, he was elected from same seat as a member of All India Forward Bloc.
