= Prasanta Digar =

Indian politician (born 1987)

Member of the West Bengal Legislative Assembly
- Incumbent
- Assumed office May 2026
- Preceded by: Biswanath Karak
- Constituency: Goghat

Personal details
- Party: Bharatiya Janata Party
- Spouse: Mousumi Digar (Ghoroi)
- Children: 2
- Parent: Jagannath Digar
- Education: Chaudhary Charan Singh University
- Profession: Politician; Business; Social Work

Prasanta Digar (born 1987) is an Indian politician from West Bengal. He is a member of West Bengal Legislative Assembly from Goghat Assembly constituency, which is reserved for Scheduled Caste community, in Hooghly district representing the Bharatiya Janata Party.

== Early life ==
Digar is from Goghat, Hooghly district, West Bengal. He is the son of Jagannath Digar. He completed his Bachelor of Arts at a college affiliated with Choudhary Charan Singh University, Meerut in 2013. He runs his own business. He declared assets worth Rs.1 crore in his affidavit to the Election Commission of India.

== Career ==
Digar won the Goghat Assembly constituency representing the Bharatiya Janata Party in the 2026 West Bengal Legislative Assembly election. He polled 1,34,498 votes and defeated his nearest rival, Nirmal Maji of the All India Trinamool Congress, by a margin of 49,582 votes.

=== Electoral performance ===
West Bengal Legislative Assembly
Year	Constituency	Party	Votes	%	Opponent	Party	Votes	%	Margin	Result
2026	Goghat	BJP	1,34,498	57.39	Nirmal Maji	AITC	84,916	36.29	49,582	Won

== See also ==
- 2026 West Bengal Legislative Assembly election
- List of chief ministers of West Bengal
- West Bengal Legislative Assembly
