= Balin, Iran =

Village in Kermanshah, Iran

Belin (Persian: بلين, also Romanized as Belin) is a village in Qarah Su Rural District, in the Central District of Kermanshah County, Kermanshah Province, Iran. At the 2006 census, its population was 86, in 16 families.
