= Goghat =

- Village
- Location in West Bengal, India Goghat (India)
- Coordinates: 22°53′16″N 87°42′7″E
- Country: India
- State: West Bengal
- District: Hooghly

Government
  - Type: Panchayati raj (India)
  - Body: Gram panchayat

Population (2011)
  - Total: 5,495

Languages
  - Official: Bengali, English
- Time zone: UTC+5:30 (IST)
- ISO 3166 code: IN-WB
- Vehicle registration: WB
- Website: wb.gov.in

Goghat is a village in the Goghat I CD block in the Arambag subdivision of the Hooghly district in the Indian state of West Bengal.

== Geography ==
Cities and towns in Arambagh subdivision in Hooghly district
M: municipal city/ town, R: rural/ urban centre, H: historical/ religious centre
Owing to space constraints in the small map, the actual locations in a larger map may vary slightly

=== Location ===
Goghat is located at 22°53′16″N 87°42′7″E.

=== Area overview ===
The Arambagh subdivision, presented in the map alongside, is divided into two physiographic parts – the Dwarakeswar River being the dividing line. The western part is upland and rocky – it is the extension of the terrain of neighbouring Bankura district. The eastern part is flat alluvial plain area. The railways, the roads and flood-control measures have had an impact on the area. The area is overwhelmingly rural with 94.77% of the population living in rural areas and 5.23% of the population living in urban areas.

Note: The map alongside presents some of the notable locations in the subdivision. All places marked in the map are linked in the larger full screen map.

== Demographics ==
According to the 2011 Census of India, Goghat had a total population of 5,495 of which 2,798 (51%) were males and 2,699 (49%) were females. Population in the age range 0–6 years was 580. The total number of literate persons in Goghat was 4,135 (84.13% of the population over 6 years).

== Civic administration ==
=== Police station ===
Goghat police station has jurisdiction over Goghat I and Goghat II CD blocks.

=== CD block HQ ===
The headquarters of Goghat I CD block are located at Goghat.

== Transport ==
EMU services, earlier operating from Howrah to Arambag, was extended to Goghat railway station, after completion of the electrified broad gauge Tarakewar-Goghat sector of the Tarakeswar-Bishnupur extension of the Sheoraphuli–Bishnupur branch line.
