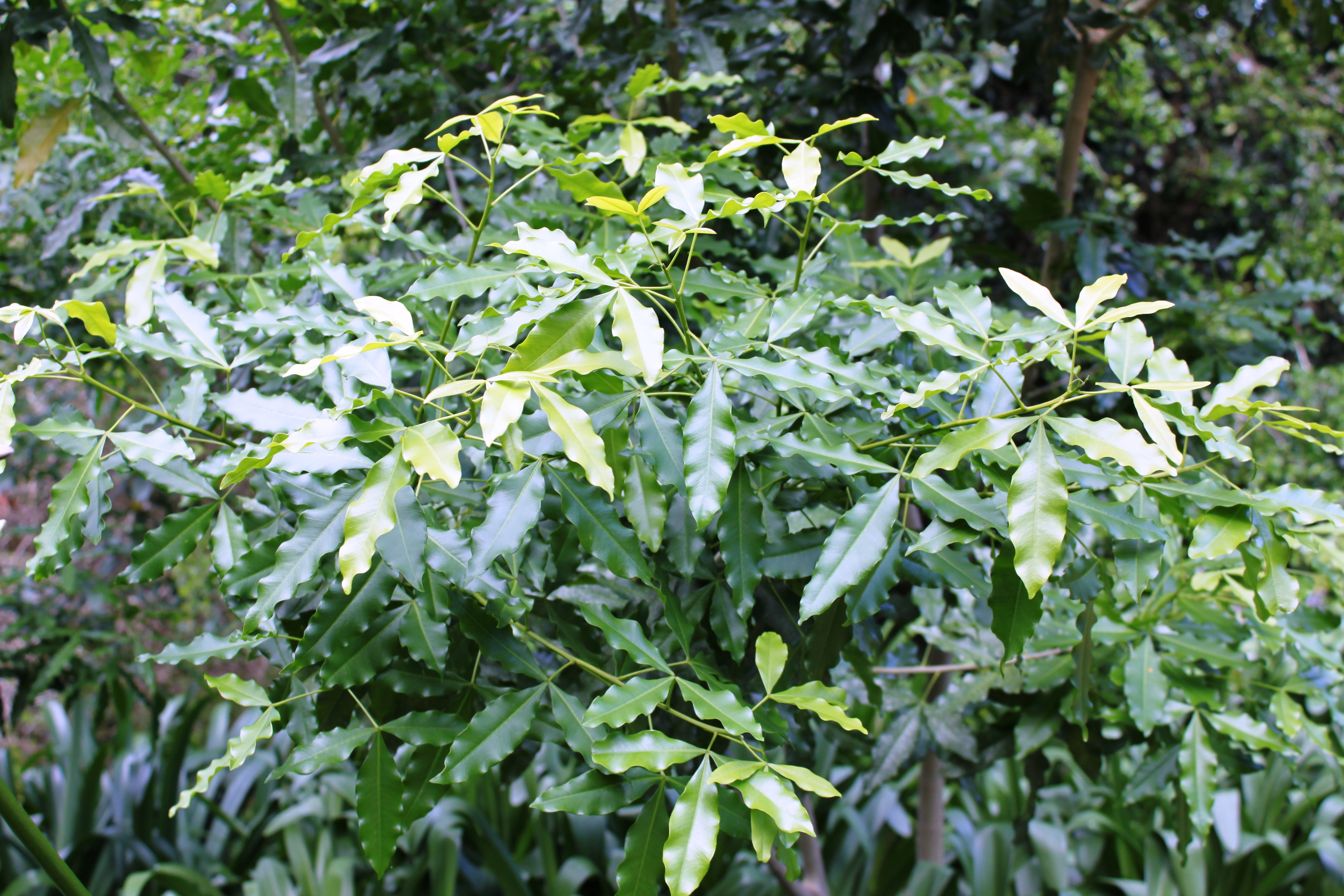
- Foliage of Vepris lanceolata

Scientific classification
- Kingdom: Plantae
- Clade: Tracheophytes
- Clade: Angiosperms
- Clade: Eudicots
- Clade: Rosids
- Order: Sapindales
- Family: Rutaceae
- Subfamily: Zanthoxyloideae
- Genus: Vepris; Comm. ex A.Juss

Synonyms
- Araliopsis Engl.; Asaphes DC.; Aspidostigma Hochst.; Comoroa Oliv.; Diphasia Pierre; Diphasiopsis Mendonça; Humblotiodendron Engl.; Oricia Pierre; Oriciopsis Engl.; Teclea Delile; Tecleopsis Hoyle & Leakey; Toddaliopsis Engl.

= Vepris =

Genus of flowering plants

Vepris is a genus of plant in family Rutaceae. It comprises around 90 species, mainly from tropical Africa, Madagascar and the Mascarene Islands and at a lesser extent Arabia and India.

== Species ==
As of September 2021, Plants of the World Online (PoWO) accepted the following species:

- Vepris adamaouae Onana
- Vepris afzelii (Engl.) Mziray
- Vepris allenii I.Verd.
- Vepris amaniensis (Engl.) Mziray
- Vepris ampody H.Perrier
- Vepris aralioides H.Perrier
- Vepris araliopsioides Onana
- Vepris arenicola H.Perrier
- Vepris arushensis Kokwaro
- Vepris bachmannii (Engl.) Mziray
- Vepris bali Cheek
- Vepris bilocularis (Wight & Arn.) Engl.
- Vepris boiviniana (Baill.) Mziray
- Vepris borenensis (M.G.Gilbert) W.Mziray, synonym of Teclea borenensis, unplaced name according to PoWO
- Vepris bremekampii (I.Verd.) Mziray
- Vepris calcicola H.Perrier
- Vepris carringtoniana Mendonça
- Vepris cauliflora H.Perrier
- Vepris dainellii (Pic.Serm.) Kokwaro
- Vepris darcyi Labat, M.Pignal & O.Pascal
- Vepris decaryana H.Perrier
- Vepris densiflora (Baker) I.Verd.
- Vepris dicarpella H.Perrier
- Vepris drummondii Mendonça
- Vepris ebolowensis (Engl.) Onana
- Vepris eggelingii (Kokwaro) Mziray
- Vepris elegantissima F.White & Pannell
- Vepris elliotii (Radlk.) I.Verd.
- Vepris eugeniifolia (Engl.) I.Verd.
- Vepris fadenii (Kokwaro) Mziray
- Vepris fanshawei Mendonça
- Vepris felicis Breteler
- Vepris fer Cheek
- Vepris fitoravina H.Perrier
- Vepris gabonensis (Pierre) Mziray
- Vepris gamopetala H.Perrier
- Vepris gerrardii (I.Verd.) E.J.D.Schmidt
- Vepris glaberrima (Engl.) J.B.Hall ex D.J.Harris
- Vepris glandulosa (Hoyle & Leakey) Kokwaro
- Vepris glomerata (F.Hoffm.) Engl.
- Vepris gossweileri (I.Verd.) Mziray
- Vepris grandifolia (Engl.) Mziray
- Vepris hanangensis (Kokwaro) Mziray
- Vepris heterophylla (Engl.) Letouzey
- Vepris hiernii Gereau
- Vepris humbertii H.Perrier
- Vepris lanceolata (Lam.) G.Don
- Vepris leandriana H.Perrier
- Vepris lecomteana (Pierre) Cheek & T.Heller
- Vepris lepidota Capuron
- Vepris letouzeyi Onana
- Vepris louisii G.C.C.Gilbert
- Vepris louvelii H.Perrier
- Vepris macedoi (Exell & Mendonça) Mziray
- Vepris macrophylla (Baker) I.Verd.
- Vepris mandangoana Lisowski
- Vepris mbamensis Onana
- Vepris mendoncana Mziray
- Vepris mildbraediana G.M.Schulze
- Vepris montisbambutensis Onana
- Vepris morogorensis (Kokwaro) Mziray
- Vepris myrei (Exell & Mendonça) Mziray
- Vepris natalensis (Sond.) Mziray
- Vepris ngamensis I.Verd.
- Vepris nitida I.Verd.
- Vepris nobilis (Delile) Mziray
- Vepris noldeae (Exell & Mendonça) Mziray
- Vepris occidentalis Cheek & Onana
- Vepris oubanguensis (Aubrév. & Pellegr.) Onana
- Vepris parvicalyx H.Perrier
- Vepris peraperta H.Perrier
- Vepris polymorpha H.Perrier
- Vepris reflexa I.Verd.
- Vepris renieri (G.C.C.Gilbert) Mziray
- Vepris rogersii (Mendonça) Mziray
- Vepris samburuensis Kokwaro
- Vepris sansibarensis (Engl.) Mziray
- Vepris schliebenii Mildbr.
- Vepris sclerophylla H.Perrier
- Vepris soyauxii (Engl.) Mziray
- Vepris spathulata (Engl.) H.Perrier
- Vepris stolzii I.Verd.
- Vepris suaveolens (Engl.) Mziray
- Vepris termitaria Mendonça
- Vepris trichocarpa (Engl.) Mziray
- Vepris trifoliolata (Engl.) Mziray
- Vepris uguenensis Engl.
- Vepris unifoliolata (Baill.) Labat, M.Pignal & O.Pascal
- Vepris verdoorniana (Exell & Mendonça) Mziray
- Vepris welwitschii (Hiern) Exell
- Vepris whitei Mendonça
- Vepris zambesiaca S.Moore
