= Berimvand, Miyan Darband =

Berimvand بريموند
- Village
- Location within Iran
- Coordinates: 34°30′42″N 46°49′58″E
- Country: Iran
- Province: Kermanshah
- County: Kermanshah
- Bakhsh: Central
- Rural District: Miyan Darband

Population (2006)
  - Total: 181
- Time zone: UTC+3:30 (IRST)
  - Summer (DST): UTC+4:30 (IRDT)

Berimvand (Persian: بريموند, also Romanized as Berīmvand and Berīmownd; also known as Berīnavān, Parīmownd, and Variman) is a village in Miyan Darband Rural District, in the Central District of Kermanshah County, Kermanshah Province, Iran. At the 2006 census, its population was 181, in 36 families.
