= Bali language =

Bali may refer to any of several languages:

- Balinese language, spoken in Indonesia, especially the island of Bali
- Bali language (Adamawa), spoken in Demsa, Adamawa, Nigeria
- Bali language (DRC), a Bantu language spoken in the Democratic Republic of the Congo
- East Teke language, a member of the Teke dialect continuum of the Congolese plateau
- Bali (Li) dialect of Nga'ka language (Cameroon)
- Uneapa language (sometimes called "Bali"), spoken in Bali Island, Papua New Guinea

== See also ==
- Pali language
