= Cecilia Ballí =

American journalist and anthropologist

- Born: April 21, 1976 (age 50); Brownsville, Texas, U.S.
- Education: Stanford University; Rice University (JD)
- Occupations: Journalist, professor
- Writing career
- Genre: Non-fiction

Cecilia Ballí (born April 21, 1976) is an American journalist and anthropologist who writes about the borderlands of Texas, security and immigration. She is a writer-at-large for Texas Monthly, and has been published in Harper's Magazine and The New York Times Magazine as an independent journalist. She has been an assistant professor at the University of Texas at Austin and was a staff writer at the San Antonio Express-News from 1998 to 2000.

== Early life and education ==
Ballí was born on April 21, 1976, in Brownsville, Texas. She is the daughter of Antonia and Cristobal Balli, immigrants from Mexico. She has a fraternal twin, Celia and an older sister, Cristina. In the early 1980s, her family spent summers as migrant workers in California. They took long trips on the way, visiting reservations and natural sites. Cristina Ballí described their father, who died in 1987 when Cecilia was 11 years old, as "a cultural anthropologist, without an education."

Cecilia Ballí attended Homer Hanna High School in Brownsville and graduated valedictorian in 1994. She spent several summers as a staff writer at The Brownsville Herald.

Ballí did her undergraduate studies at Stanford University, where she received a Mellon minority undergraduate research grant and participated in the Irvine summer program for future doctoral students. Her thesis was on the Tejano dance music scene and Tejano talk radio.

In 1998, Ballí was the co-recipient of the 1998 Arturo Islas Jr. Prize for overall academic excellence and the winner of the 1998 Robert M. Golden Medal for Excellence in Humanities and Creative Arts. She graduated with honors in 1998, with a degree in American Studies and Spanish.

She interned in 1998 at the Washington, D.C., bureau of the Los Angeles Times.

Ballí has a Ph.D. in cultural anthropology from Rice University in Houston, Texas. She was a 2002 Soros fellow and her 2009 dissertation was: “Murdered Women on the Border: Gender, Territory and Power in Ciudad Juárez.”

== Career ==
Ballí was the first Latina writer-at-large for the Texas Monthly, where she has covered borders, security and immigration since 2000. She wrote the introduction to the 2005 book No Place for Children: Voices from Juvenile Detention.

In 2008, Ballí joined the anthropology department at the University of Texas at Austin as an assistant professor where she remained until 2014. She continued her work as an independent journalist while teaching and researching. Ballí has written for many publications including: Harper’s, including the 2012 story "Calderón’s War: The gruesome legacy of Mexico" and The New York Times Magazine, including a feature about Arizona border towns.

In 2014, Ballí was a fellow at the Dart Center for Journalism and Trauma at Columbia University. She was the Texas Institute of Letters’ 2015 Jesse H. Jones Dobie Paisano Fellow. At the time, she told the Statesman that years of researching and writing about violence left her with post-traumatic stress. "The border, it’s a very lively place. It’s always remaking itself, but something about it feels like it’s changed permanently. The fear, the inability to literally move through space in the same way, the inability to relate to family across the border in the same way — all that has changed," she said.

Ballí started the communications strategy firm Culture Concepts LLC in 2018.

== Honors & awards ==
Ballí was a finalist in 2004 for the Livingston Awards for Young Journalists and the John Bartlow Award for Public Interest Magazine Journalism. In 2004, the National Association of Hispanic Journalists named her Emerging Journalist of the Year.

In 2008, she was a distinguished finalist for the J. Anthony Lukas Work-in-Progress Award given by the Columbia University Graduate School of Journalism.

Ballí was elected as a member of the Texas Institute of Letters in 2024.

== Bibliography ==
Ballí wrote the introduction to the 2005 book No Place for Children: Voices from Juvenile Detention.

Her forthcoming book is The Fence: U.S.-Mexico Border Enforcement in the Age of National Security.

She was currently a book about mariachis, an expansion of a piece she published in The New York Times Magazine, “A Championship Season in Mariachi Country.”

== See also/Further reading ==
- A profile of Cecilia Ballí in the Brownsville Herald
- Ballí's photography and anthropology on PRI
- Profile of Ballí in the Statesman
