= Sonni Balli =

Ghanaian dancehall musician (1982–2022)

- Born: Sonny Kwabena Amoako Akoanor. 6 June 1982
- Died: 9 June 2022 (aged 40)
- Known for: Dancehall

Kwabena Amoako Akoanor (6 June 1982 - 9 June 2022) also known as Sonni Balli was a Ghanaian dancehall artiste.

== Early life ==
He started doing music at an early age of 17 without his parents' approval as a result of being the first born of three siblings, his parents wanted him to become a doctor but he decided to do music.

== Career ==
At an early age, he teamed up with a music producer called Nana King to come out with the albums Kotoho and Abrabo, he later was part of a group called G-Life, as result of his good works he inspired other acts like Samini, Shatta Wale and more. He also featured artists like Slim Buster, Marry Agyapong and Lord Kenya.

== Death ==
It was alleged that he died as a result of cardiac arrest.

== Discography ==
- Elaale
- Love My Ex
- The Truth (Kulcha Riddim)
- Gimme
