= Vepris bali =

Conservation status
- Critically endangered, possibly extinct (IUCN 3.1)

Scientific classification
- Kingdom: Plantae
- Clade: Tracheophytes
- Clade: Angiosperms
- Clade: Eudicots
- Clade: Rosids
- Order: Sapindales
- Family: Rutaceae
- Genus: Vepris
- Species: V. bali

Binomial name
- Vepris bali Cheek

Species of tree

Vepris bali is a species of plant in the family Rutaceae. It is a tree recorded from a cloud forest remnant of the Bamenda Highlands of Cameroon. It is the twentieth known species of Vepris from Cameroon in West Central Africa.

The trifoliolate leaves of the plant are opposite, and have long petiolules, both unusual features among the West Central African species of the genus. It was formally published as a new species in 2018 from herbarium specimens collected in 1951 by the Nigerian forester Edwin Ujor from Bali Ngemba Forest Reserve, a remnant of submontane forest of great conservation importance in the Bamenda Highlands of Cameroon. No other specimens of the species have yet been found despite targeted searches by teams of botanists in the early years of the twenty-first century. It has not yet been formally assessed by the IUCN but it is believed to be Critically Endangered (Possibly Extinct) due to habitat loss.

== Sources ==
- Cheek, M; Gosline, G; Onana, J-M (2018). "Vepris bali (Rutaceae), a new critically endangered (possibly extinct) cloud forest tree species from Bali Ngemba, Cameroon". Willdenowia. 48 (2): 285–292. doi:10.3372/wi.48.48207.
