= 770 Bali =

Main-belt asteroid

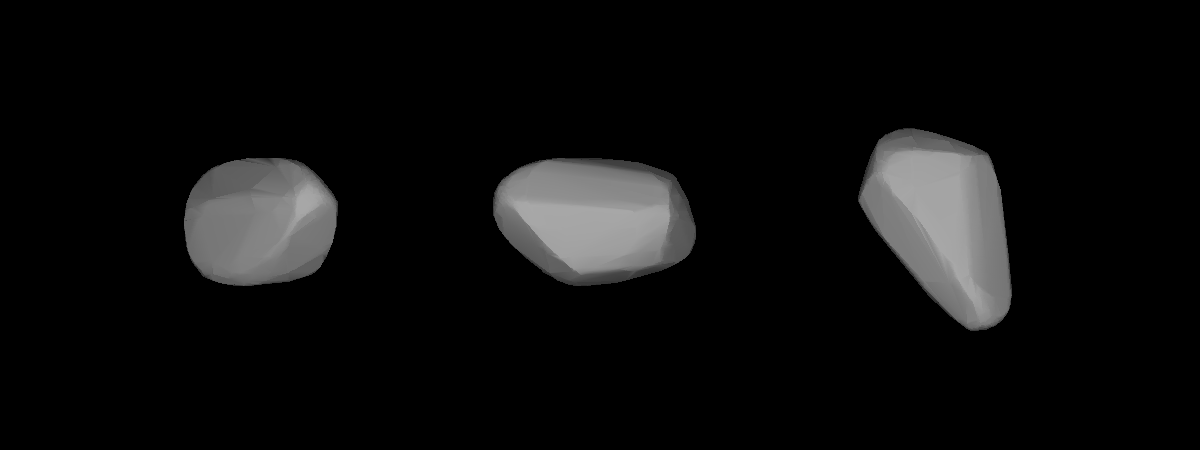
- A three-dimensional model of 770 Bali based on its light curve.

Discovery
- Discovered by: A. Massinger
- Discovery site: Heidelberg Obs.
- Discovery date: 31 October 1913

Designations
- Pronunciation: /ˈbæli/, /ˈbɑːli/
- Named after: Bali (Indonesian island)
- Alternative designations: 1913 TE

Orbital characteristics
- Epoch 4 September 2017 (JD 2458000.5)
- Uncertainty parameter 0
- Observation arc: 113.62 yr (41,501 days)
- Aphelion: 2.5557 AU
- Perihelion: 1.8876 AU
- Semi-major axis: 2.2216 AU
- Eccentricity: 0.1504
- Orbital period (sidereal): 3.31 yr (1,209 days)
- Mean anomaly: 119.08°
- Mean motion: 0° 17^{m} 51.36^{s} / day
- Inclination: 4.3849°
- Longitude of ascending node: 44.697°
- Argument of perihelion: 18.069°

Physical characteristics
- Mean diameter: 16.388±0.286 km
- Synodic rotation period: 5.8199 ± 0.0001 h (0.24250 ± 4.1667×10^{−6} d)
- Geometric albedo: 0.2483±0.037
- Spectral type: S (Tholen)
- Absolute magnitude (H): 10.9

770 Bali is a minor planet orbiting the Sun. It is a member of the Flora family. It was discovered on 31 October 1913, by German astronomer Adam Massinger at the Heidelberg Observatory in southwest Germany. The asteroid was probably named after the Indonesian island of Bali, as the discoverer had named a couple other asteroids after places in Indonesia. The alternative hypothesis is that it was named after Bali, king of the Daityas in Hindu mythology.
