= Bali, Bagpat =

Village in Uttar Pradesh, India

Bali
- Village
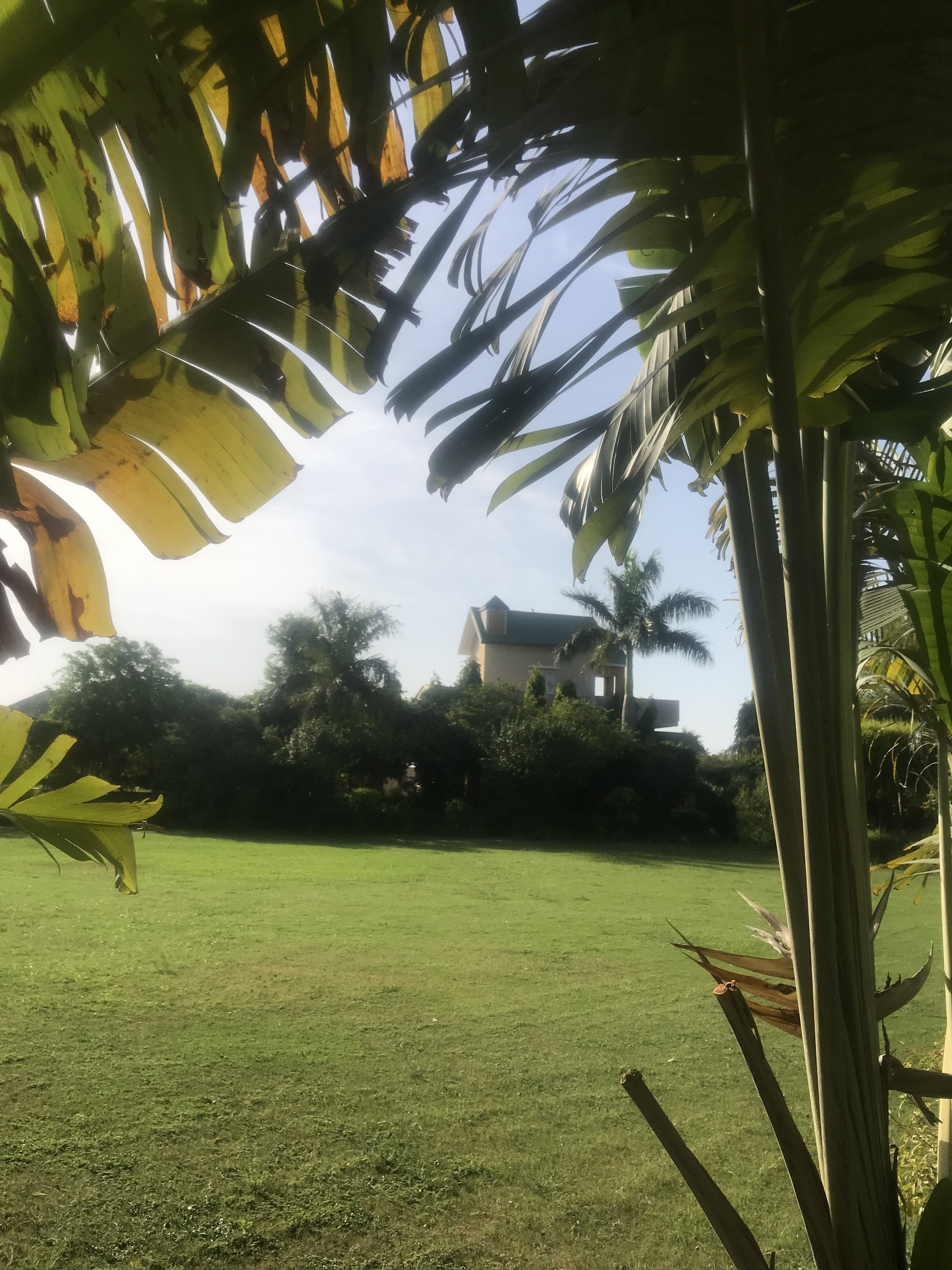
- Hira Vila farmhouse located in Bali village, Bagpat
- Interactive map of Bali
- Coordinates: 28.970°N 77.286°E
- Country: India
- State: Uttar Pradesh
- District: Bagpat
- Block: Baghpat

Population (2011)
  - Total: 5,005

Bali is a village in the Indian state of Uttar Pradesh. It is located in the Baghpat block of the Bagpat district.

== Administration ==
The village is administered by a Panchayat. In 2021 the Sarpanch (village chief) at present smt Poonam Devi. He has served from 2016 to 2021

== Economy ==
Agriculture is the main occupation. Major crops include sugarcane, wheat and rice. Vegetables including gourds, pumpkins, potatoes, ladyfinger, spinach, radish and carrots are cultivated. Some villagers work at Baghpat Cooperative Sugar Mills, one-half km from Baghpat city. There are many shops like grocery and dairy products, and also a tailor workshop "Ladies Clothes House".

== Education ==
The village has four schools: Sardar Vallabhbhai Patel School, Shaeedh Manveer National School and two government schools. The nearest colleges are located in neighbouring towns Agarwal mandi tatiri, Baghpat, and Baraut.

== Facilities ==
The village has a small hospital. Neighbouring Baraut is home to Aastha Multi Speciality Hospital. Several bigger hospitals are located in Baghpat. Sarvodaya hospital is located in Tatari village.

== Transport ==
Baghpat Road Railway Station is 2 km from the village.

== Culture ==
Temples include Shiv Mandir, Baba Mohan Ram Mandir, Devi Mandir, Balmikhi Mandir, Ravidas Mandir, and Mata Mandir.

== Demographics ==
As of the 2011 India census, Bali had a population of 5,005 including 2,670 males and 2,335 females. Its literacy rate of 76.74% was above the state average. The literacy is higher among males (87.84%) than females (64.16%). Mandar clan of Gurjars form the majority of the population.
