= Balinese =

Balinese may refer to:

- Bali, an Indonesian island
- Balinese art
- Balinese dance
- Balinese people
- Balinese language
- Nusa Penida Balinese
- Bali Aga Balinese
  - Balinese script
  - Balinese (Unicode block)
- Balinese mythology
- Balinese cat, a cat breed
- Balinese Gamelan, local music
- Balinese Room, a famous illegal casino in Galveston, Texas
- "Balinese", a song by ZZ Top from their 1975 album, Fandango!

== See also ==
- Bali (disambiguation)
