= Berimvand, Qarah Su =

Berimvand بريموند
- Village
- Location within Iran
- Coordinates: 34°17′43″N 47°06′35″E
- Country: Iran
- Province: Kermanshah
- County: Kermanshah
- Bakhsh: Central
- Rural District: Qarah Su

Population (2006)
  - Total: 259
- Time zone: UTC+3:30 (IRST)
  - Summer (DST): UTC+4:30 (IRDT)

Berimvand (Persian: بريموند, also Romanized as Berīmvand) is a village in Qarah Su Rural District, in the Central District of Kermanshah County, Kermanshah Province, Iran. At the 2006 census, its population was 259, in 53 families.
