= Goghat Assembly constituency =

Goghat
- Constituency No. 201 for the West Bengal Legislative Assembly
- Interactive Map Outlining Goghat Assembly Constituency

Constituency details
- Country: India
- Region: East India
- State: West Bengal
- District: Hooghly
- Lok Sabha constituency: Arambagh
- Established: 1951
- Total electors: 193,284
- Reservation: SC

Member of Legislative Assembly
- 18th West Bengal Legislative Assembly
- Incumbent Prasanta Digar
- Party: BJP
- Alliance: NDA
- Elected year: 2026

Goghat Assembly constituency is an assembly constituency in Hooghly district in the Indian state of West Bengal. It is reserved for scheduled castes.

== Overview ==
As per orders of the Delimitation Commission, No. 201 Goghat Assembly constituency (SC) is composed of the following: Goghat I and Goghat II community development blocks

Goghat Assembly constituency (SC) is part of No. 29 Arambagh Lok Sabha constituency (SC).

== Members of the Legislative Assembly ==
Year	Name	Party
1951	Radha Krishna Pal	Independent politician
1957	Seat did not exist	
1962	Seat did not exist	
1967	Ajit Kumar Biswas	All India Forward Bloc
1969	Ajit Kumar Biswas	All India Forward Bloc
1971	Madan Mohan Medda	Indian National Congress
1972	Madan Mohan Medda	Indian National Congress
1977	Manuram Roy	Janata Party
1982	Shiba Prasad Malick	All India Forward Bloc
1987	Shiba Prasad Malick	All India Forward Bloc
1991	Shiba Prasad Malick	All India Forward Bloc
1996	Shiba Prasad Malick	All India Forward Bloc
2001	Shiba Prasad Malick	All India Forward Bloc
2006	Niranjan Pandit	All India Forward Bloc
2011	Biswanath Karak	All India Forward Bloc
2016	Manas Majumdar	Trinamool Congress
2021	Biswanath Karak	Bharatiya Janata Party
2026	Prasanta Digar	Bharatiya Janata Party

== Election results ==
=== 2026 ===
2026 West Bengal Legislative Assembly election: Goghat
Party	Candidate	Votes	%	±%
BJP	Prasanta Digar	134,498	57.4	▲10.84
AITC	Nirmal Maji	84,916	36.24	▼8.43
AIFB	Muktaram Dhawrey	9,185	3.92	▼2.63
NOTA	None of the above	2,421	1.03	▼0.1
Majority		49,582	21.16	▲19.27
Turnout		234,321	94.36	▲5.32
BJP hold		Swing		

=== 2021 ===
2021 West Bengal Legislative Assembly election: Goghat
Party	Candidate	Votes	%	±%
BJP	Biswanath Karak	102,227	46.56	▲36.98
AITC	Manas Majumdar	98,080	44.67	▼7.21
AIFB	Shiba Prasad Malick	14,378	6.55	▼29.77
NOTA	None of the above	2,482	1.13	▼1.10
BSP	Samir Roy	2,378	1.08	New entry
Majority		4,147	1.89	▼13.67
Turnout		219,545	89.04	▲0.50
BJP gain from AITC		Swing		

=== 2016 ===
2016 West Bengal Legislative Assembly election: Goghat
Party	Candidate	Votes	%	±%
AITC	Manas Majumdar	102,958	51.88	New entry
AIFB	Biswanath Karak	72,072	36.32	▼12.72
BJP	Basan Ray	19,009	9.58	▲5.24
NOTA	None of the above	4,423	2.23	New entry
Majority		30,886	15.56	▲13.14
Turnout		1,98,462	88.54	▼2.66
AITC gain from AIFB		Swing		

=== 2011 ===
2011 West Bengal Legislative Assembly election: Goghat
Party	Candidate	Votes	%	±%
AIFB	Biswanath Karak	86,514	49.04	▼20.72
INC	Debasish Medda	82,249	46.62	▲40.24
BJP	Sukumar Bag	7,657	4.34	New entry
Majority		4,265	2.42	▼43.49
Turnout		1,76,420	91.20	▲0.20
AIFB hold		Swing		

=== 2006 ===
2006 West Bengal Legislative Assembly election: Goghat
Party	Candidate	Votes	%	±%
AIFB	Niranjan Pandit	111,228	69.76	▼9.42
AITC	Bishnupada Pakhira	38,027	23.85	New entry
INC	Haradhan Santra	10,180	6.38	▼8.51
Majority		73,201	45.91	▼18.38
Turnout		1,59,435	91.00	▲6.06
AIFB hold		Swing		

=== 2001 ===
2001 West Bengal Legislative Assembly election: Goghat
Party	Candidate	Votes	%	±%
AIFB	Shiba Prasad Malick	119,236	79.18	
INC	Haradhan Santra	22,427	14.89	
BJP	Mahadeb Santra	8,931	5.93	
Majority		96,809	64.29	
Turnout		1,50,594	84.94	
AIFB hold		Swing		

=== 1977-1996 ===
In the 2006 election Lakshmi Charan Kanri of All India Forward Bloc won the Goghat assembly seat Sove Dhara in 1991, Nanu Ram Roy in 1987 and Madan Mohan Medda in 1982. Manuram Roy of Janata Party defeated Arati Biswas of Forward Bloc in 1977.

=== 1951-1972 ===
Madan Mohan Medda of Congress won in 1972 and 1971. Ajit Kumar Biswas of Forward Bloc won in 1969 and 1967. The Goghat seat was not there in 1962 and 1957. In independent India's first election in 1951, Radha Krishna Pal, Independent, won the Goghat seat.
