= Berimvand, Sarpol-e Zahab =

Berimvand بريموند
- Village
- Location within Iran
- Coordinates: 34°28′43″N 45°53′06″E
- Country: Iran
- Province: Kermanshah
- County: Sarpol-e Zahab
- Bakhsh: Central
- Rural District: Howmeh-ye Sarpol

Population (2006)
  - Total: 358
- Time zone: UTC+3:30 (IRST)
  - Summer (DST): UTC+4:30 (IRDT)

Berimvand (Persian: بريموند, also Romanized as Berīmvand and Barīmvand; also known as Berīmāvand and Bāli) is a village in Howmeh-ye Sarpol Rural District, in the Central District of Sarpol-e Zahab County, Kermanshah Province, Iran. At the 2006 census, its population was 358, in 84 families.
