= Grass wattle =

Grass wattle is a common name for several plants and may refer to:

- Acacia anomala, a shrub native to the west coast of Western Australia
- Acacia willdenowiana, a shrub native to the south west of Western Australia
