= Acacia benthamii =

Conservation status
- Priority Two — Poorly Known Taxa (DEC)

Scientific classification
- Kingdom: Plantae
- Clade: Tracheophytes
- Clade: Angiosperms
- Clade: Eudicots
- Clade: Rosids
- Order: Fabales
- Family: Fabaceae
- Subfamily: Caesalpinioideae
- Clade: Mimosoid clade
- Genus: Acacia
- Species: A. benthamii

Binomial name
- Acacia benthamii Meisn.
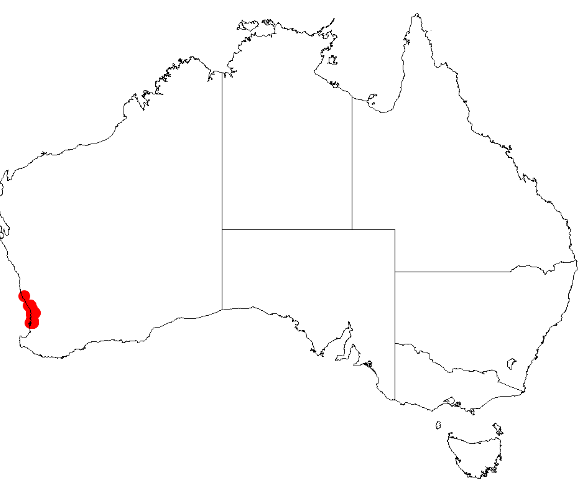
- Occurrence data from AVH

Synonyms
- Acacia benthamii Meisn. var. benthamii; Racosperma benthamii (Meisn.) Pedley

Species of shrub

Acacia benthamii, commonly known as Bentham's wattle, is a species of flowering plant in the family Fabaceae and is endemic to the west coast of Western Australia near Perth. It is a shrub with ribbed branchlets, linear, sharply-pointed phyllodes and spherical heads of golden-yellow flowers.

== Description ==
Acacia benthamii is a shrub that typically grows to a height of about 1 m (3 ft 3 in) and has ribbed branchlets, sometimes with a few minute woolly hairs. Its phyllodes are linear, thinly leathery, glabrous, 20–25 mm (0.79–0.98 in) long, 2–4 mm (0.079–0.157 in) wide and sharply-pointed with two or three main veins on each side. There are stipules 1.5–2 mm (0.059–0.079 in) long at the base of the phyllodes, but that fall off as the phyllodes develop. The flowers are borne in one or two spherical heads in axils on a peduncle 2.5–5.5 mm (0.098–0.217 in) long. Each head is 5 mm (0.20 in) in diameter with 27 to 35 golden-yellow flowers. Flowering occurs between about August to September, but the pods have not been seen.

== Taxonomy ==
Acacia benthamii was first formally described by the botanist Carl Meissner in 1844 in Lehmann's Plantae Preissianae from specimens collected by James Drummond. The specific epithet (benthamii) honours George Bentham.

This species is closely related to A. sessilis and closely resembles A. cochlearis.

== Distribution and habitat ==
Bentham's wattle is endemic to near-coastal areas of Western Australia from around Dandaragan in the north to around Subiaco in the south, and is commonly found on limestone breakaways.

== Conservation status ==
Acacia benthamii is listed as "Priority Two" by the Government of Western Australia Department of Biodiversity, Conservation and Attractions, meaning that it is poorly known and from one or a few locations.

== See also ==
- List of Acacia species
