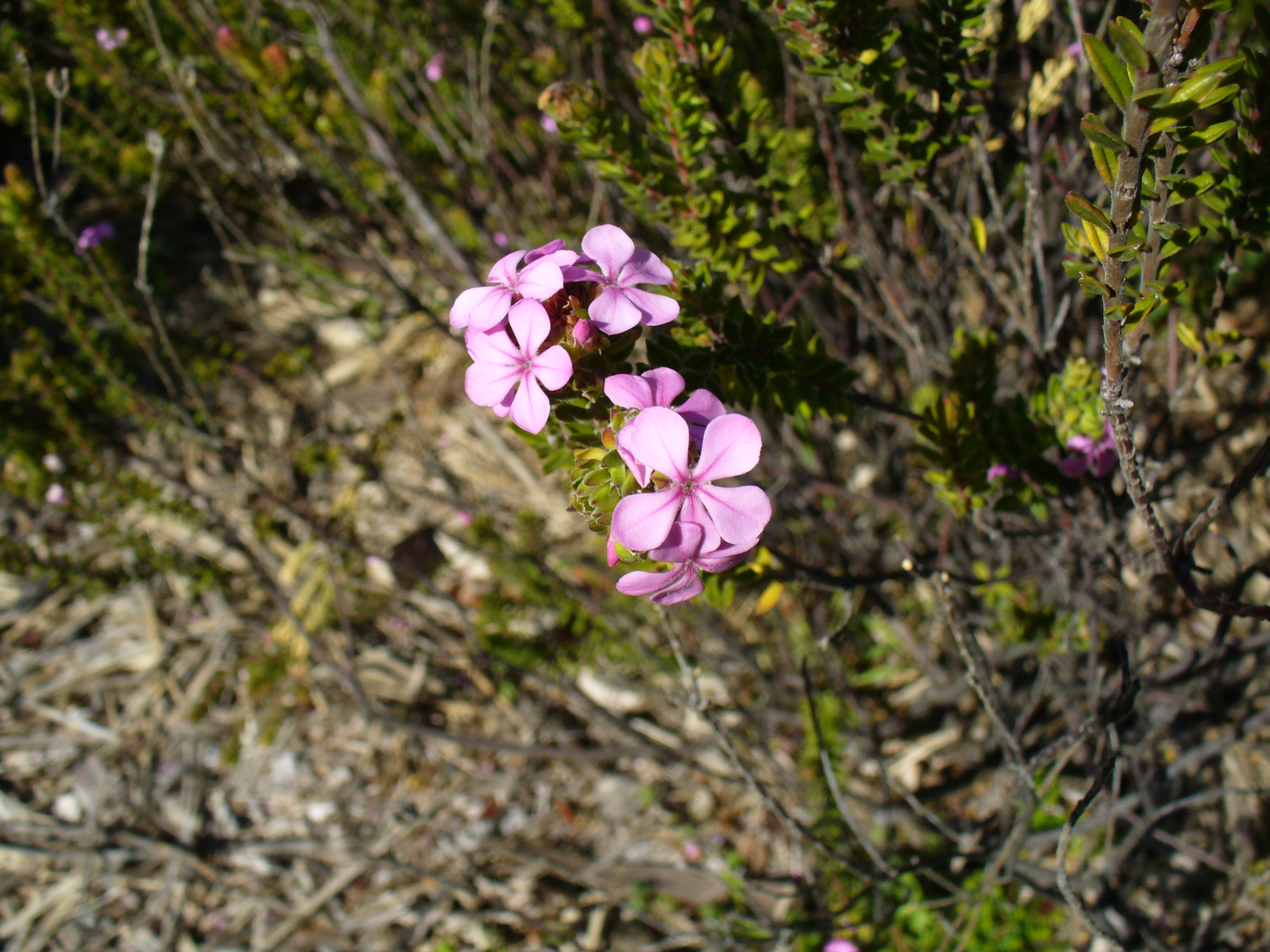
- Acmadenia mundiana

Scientific classification
- Kingdom: Plantae
- Clade: Embryophytes
- Clade: Tracheophytes
- Clade: Spermatophytes
- Clade: Angiosperms
- Clade: Eudicots
- Clade: Rosids
- Order: Sapindales
- Family: Rutaceae
- Subfamily: Zanthoxyloideae
- Genus: Acmadenia; Bartl. & H.L.Wendl.

Species
- See text.

= Acmadenia =

Genus of flowering plants

Acmadenia is a genus of flowering plants in the family Rutaceae. The species are mostly from the western Cape Province of South Africa, including:

- Acmadenia alternifolia Cham.
- Acmadenia argillophila I.Williams
- Acmadenia baileyensis I.Williams
- Acmadenia bodkinii (Schltr.) Strid
- Acmadenia burchellii Dümmer
- Acmadenia candida I.Williams
- Acmadenia densifolia Sond.
- Acmadenia faucitincta I.Williams
- Acmadenia flaccida Eckl. & Zeyh.
- Acmadenia fruticosa I.Williams
- Acmadenia gracilis Dümmer
- Acmadenia heterophylla P.E.Glover
- Acmadenia kiwanensis I.Williams
- Acmadenia latifolia I.Williams
- Acmadenia laxa I.Williams
- Acmadenia macradenia (Sond.) Dümmer
- Acmadenia macropetala (P.E.Glover) Compton
- Acmadenia maculata I.Williams
- Acmadenia matroosbergensis E.Phillips
- Acmadenia mundiana Eckl. & Zeyh.
- Acmadenia nivea I.Williams
- Acmadenia nivenii Sond.
- Acmadenia obtusata (Thunb.) Bartl. & H.L.Wendl.
- Acmadenia patentifolia I.Williams
- Acmadenia rourkeana I.Williams
- Acmadenia rupicola I.Williams
- Acmadenia sheilae I.Williams
- Acmadenia tenax I.Williams
- Acmadenia teretifolia (Link) E.Phillips
- Acmadenia tetracarpellata I.Williams
- Acmadenia tetragona (L.f.) Bartl. & H.L.Wendl.
- Acmadenia trigona (Eckl. & Zeyh.) Druce
- Acmadenia wittebergensis (Compton) I.Williams
