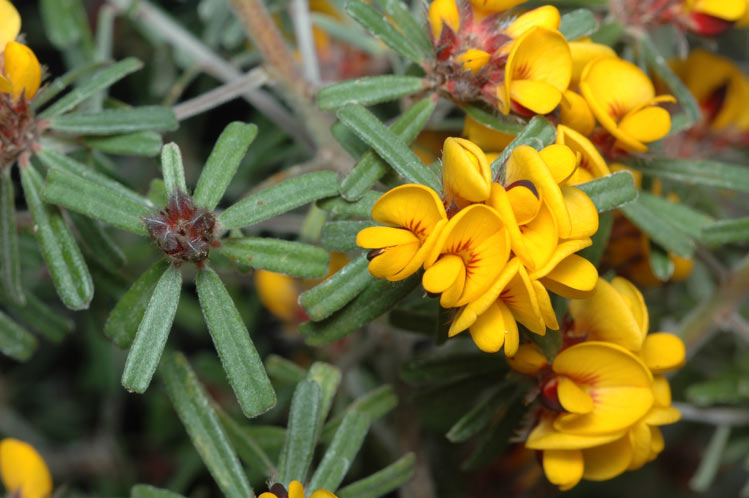
- In the Australian National Botanic Gardens

Scientific classification
- Kingdom: Plantae
- Clade: Tracheophytes
- Clade: Angiosperms
- Clade: Eudicots
- Clade: Rosids
- Order: Fabales
- Family: Fabaceae
- Subfamily: Faboideae
- Genus: Pultenaea
- Species: P. linophylla

Binomial name
- Pultenaea linophylla Schrad. & J.C.Wendl.

Synonyms
- Pultenaea amoena Sieber ex Steud. nom. inval., nom. nud.; Pultenaea amoena Sieber ex N.A.Wakef.; Pultenaea bracteata Schrad. & J.C.Wendl.; Pultenaea glaucescens DC. nom. inval., pro syn.; Pultenaea linophylla var. amoena Sieber ex DC.; Pultenaea linophylla Schrad. & J.C.Wendl. var. linophylla; Pultenaea retusa var. linophylla (Schrad. & J.C.Wendl.) Benth.; Pultenaea sp. C; Pultenaea sp. New England (Coveny 16631)

= Pultenaea linophylla =

Halo bush-pea

Species of flowering plant

Pultenaea linophylla, commonly known as halo bush-pea, is a species of flowering plant in the family Fabaceae and is endemic to south-eastern continental Australia. It is an erect or prostrate shrub with spreading branches, linear to elliptic or wedge-shaped leaves, and yellow to orange and red to purple flowers.

== Description ==
Pultenaea linophylla is an erect or prostrate shrub that typically grows to a height of 0.4–1.0 m (1 ft 4 in – 3 ft 3 in) and has wiry, spreading branches. The leaves are linear to elliptic or wedge-shaped, 4–14 mm (0.16–0.55 in) long and 2–4 mm (0.079–0.157 in) wide with dark brown, triangular to lance-shaped stipules 1.0–1.5 mm (0.039–0.059 in) long at the base. The upper surface of the leaves is darker than the lower. The flowers are arranged in groups of four to six on the ends of short branches and are 6–10 mm (0.24–0.39 in) long, each flower on a pedicel 0.5–1.0 mm (0.020–0.039 in) long. There are overlapping narrow egg-shaped to round, three-lobed bracts 2–4 mm (0.079–0.157 in) long at the base of the flowers. The sepals are 3–6 mm (0.12–0.24 in) long and densely hairy with linear to egg-shaped, three-lobed bracteoles 1.5–3.5 mm (0.059–0.138 in) long attached to the side of the sepal tube. The standard is yellow to orange and 5–6 mm (0.20–0.24 in) long, the wings are yellow to red and the keel is red to purple. Flowering occurs in most months but mainly from September to October and the fruit is a flattened, hairy pod about 6 mm (0.24 in) long.

== Taxonomy and naming ==
Pultenaea linophylla was first formally described in 1797 by Heinrich Schrader and Johann Christoph Wendland in Sertum Hannoveranum from specimens collected near Botany Bay. The specific epithet (linophylla) means "thread-leaved".

== Distribution and habitat ==
Halo push-pea grows in forest and heath from south-eastern Queensland, the coast and tablelands of New South Wales to eastern Victoria.
