= Acacia grisea =

Conservation status
- Priority Four — Rare Taxa (DEC)

Scientific classification
- Kingdom: Plantae
- Clade: Embryophytes
- Clade: Tracheophytes
- Clade: Angiosperms
- Clade: Eudicots
- Clade: Rosids
- Order: Fabales
- Family: Fabaceae
- Subfamily: Caesalpinioideae
- Clade: Mimosoid clade
- Genus: Acacia
- Species: A. grisea

Binomial name
- Acacia grisea S.Moore
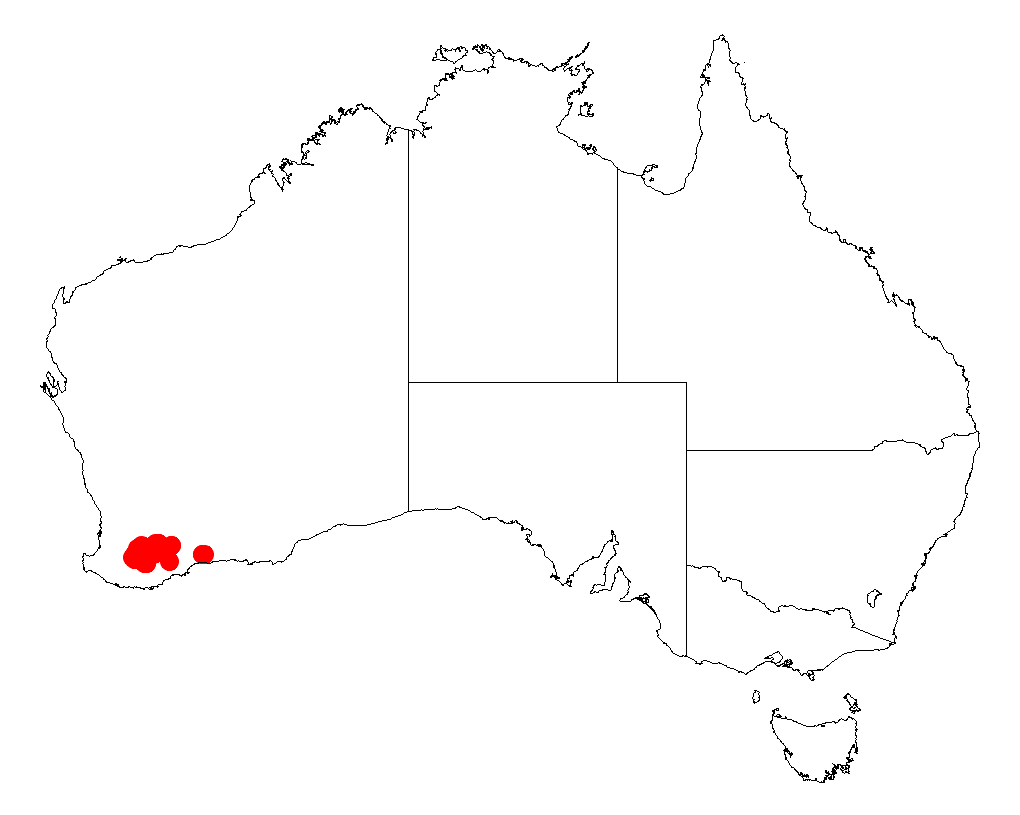
- Occurrence data from AVH

Synonyms
- Racosperma griseum (S.Moore) Pedley

Species of legume

Acacia grisea is a species of flowering plant in the family Fabaceae and is endemic to the south-west of Western Australia. It is a subshrub with bipinnate leaves and a spherical head of golden yellow flowers in leaf axils, and hairy pods.

== Description ==
Acacia grisea is a subshrub that typically grows to a height of 10–40 cm (3.9–15.7 in) and has branchlets covered with minute hairs. Its leaves are bipinnate on a rachis 1–3 mm (0.039–0.118 in) long. There are two pairs of pinnae, the lower pair 2–4 mm (0.079–0.157 in) long with two or three pairs of pinnules, the outer pair with 5–10 mm (0.20–0.39 in) long with four to seven pairs of pinnules, the pinnules more or less oblong, 2–4 mm (0.079–0.157 in) long and 1–2 mm (0.039–0.079 in) wide. The pinnules are grey-green with a gland on the rachis at the base of the pinnae. The flowers are borne in a leaf axil on a glabrous peduncle 10–20 mm (0.39–0.79 in) long, each head with 16 to 25 golden yellow flowers. Flowering occurs from June to August, and the pods are 20–40 mm (0.79–1.57 in) long, 5 mm (0.20 in) wide and hairy. The seeds are oblong to elliptic, 2.5–3.0 mm (0.098–0.118 in) long.

This species of wattle is closely related to A. browniana which is found closer to the coast.

== Taxonomy ==
Acacia grisea was first formally described in 1920 by Spencer Le Marchant Moore in the Journal of the Linnean Society, Botany from specimens collected east of Katanning by Frederick Stoward. The specific epithet (grisea) means 'grey' or 'pearl-grey', and refers to the hairs on the branches.

== Distribution and habitat ==
This species of wattle grows in gravelly loam and is restricted to the areas between Kukerin, Kojonup and Broomehill in the Avon Wheatbelt, Esperance Plains, Jarrah Forest and Mallee bioregions of south-western Western Australia.

== Conservation status ==
Acacia grisea is listed as "Priority Four" by the Government of Western Australia Department of Biodiversity, Conservation and Attractions, meaning that is rare or near threatened.

== See also ==
- List of Acacia species
