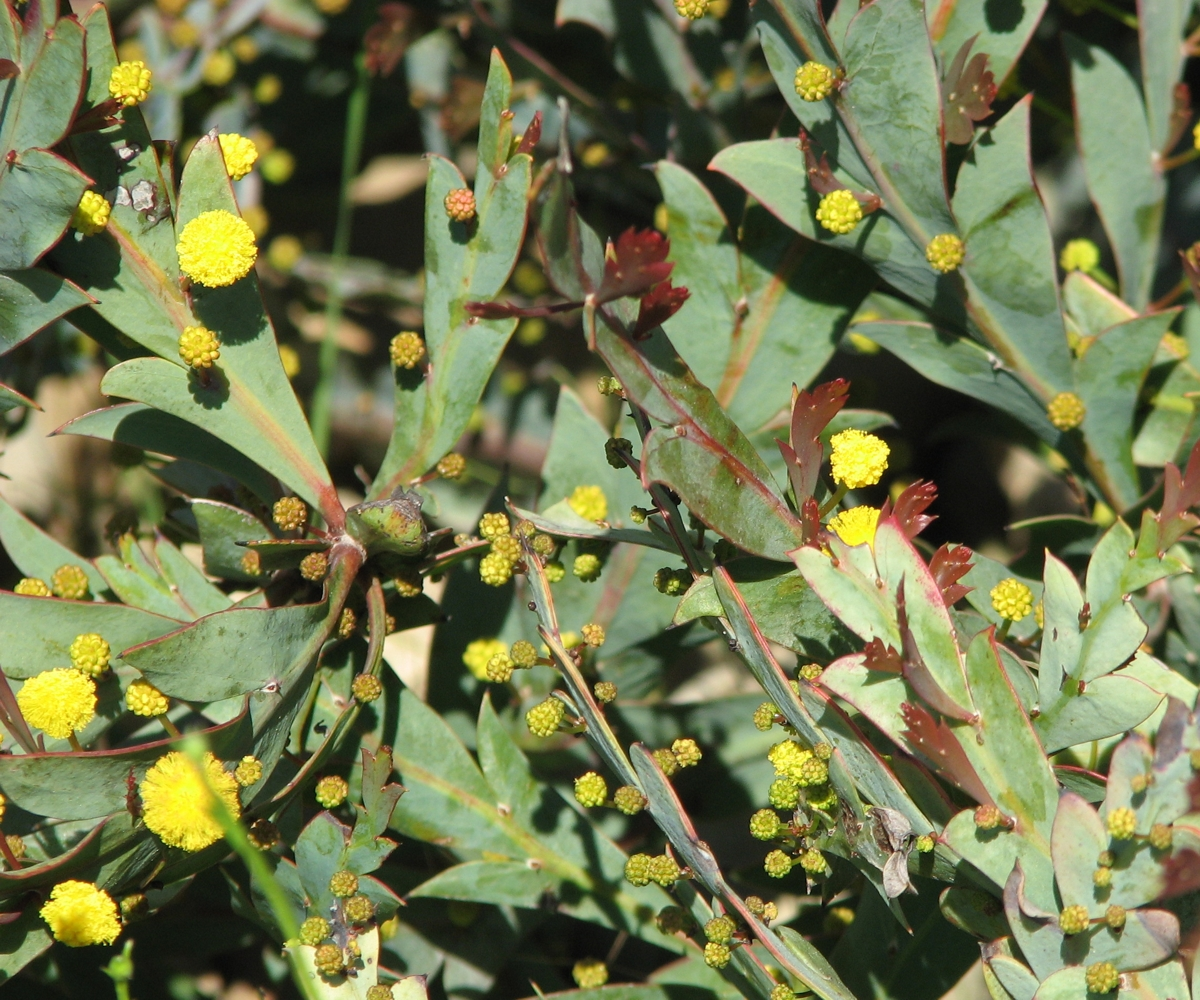

Scientific classification
- Kingdom: Plantae
- Clade: Tracheophytes
- Clade: Angiosperms
- Clade: Eudicots
- Clade: Rosids
- Order: Fabales
- Family: Fabaceae
- Subfamily: Caesalpinioideae
- Clade: Mimosoid clade
- Genus: Acacia
- Species: A. glaucoptera

Binomial name
- Acacia glaucoptera Benth.
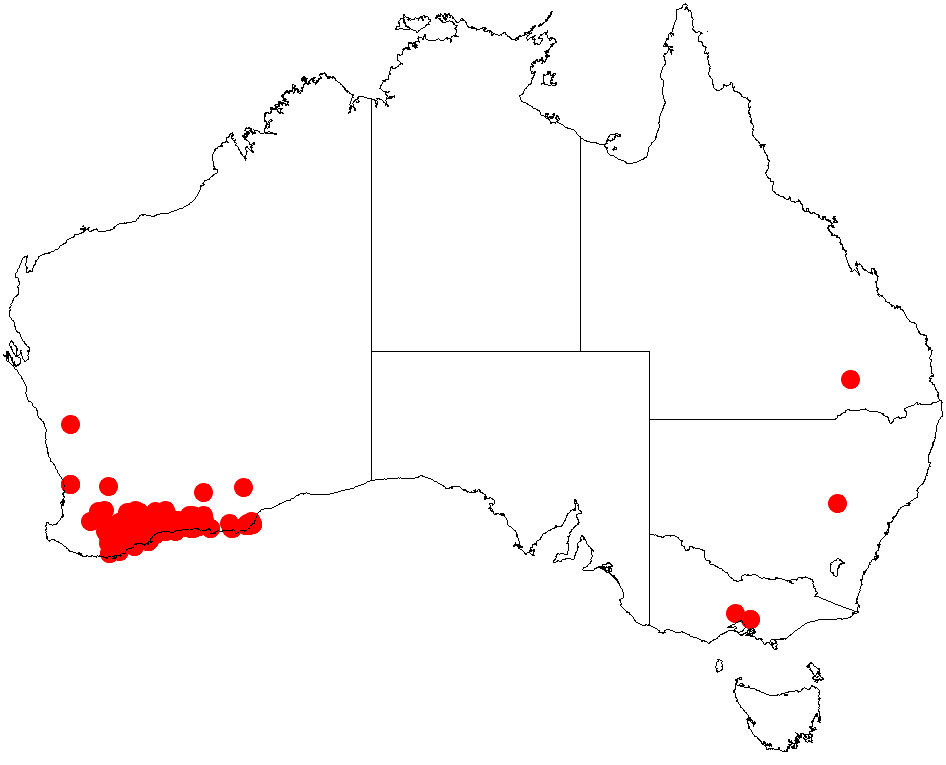
- Occurrence data from AVH

Synonyms
- Acacia sinuata Jacques; Racosperma glaucopterum (Benth.) Pedley; Acacia bossiaeoides auct. non A.Cunn. ex Benth.: Seemann, B.C. (1852)

= Acacia glaucoptera =

Flat wattle

Species of legume

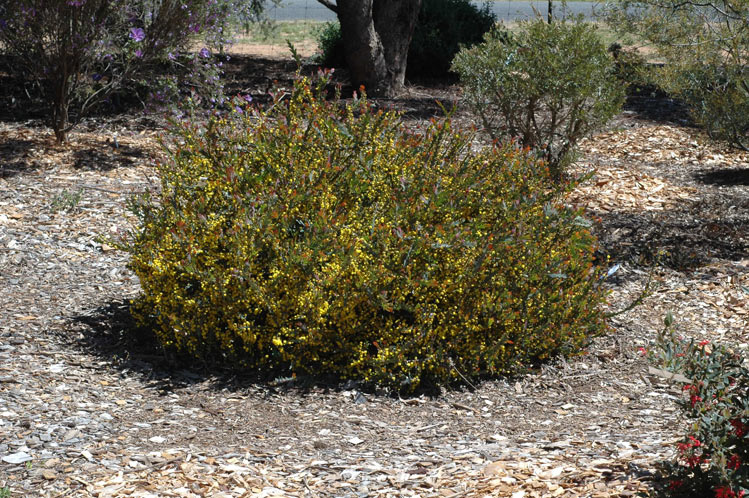
Habit

Acacia glaucoptera, commonly known as clay wattle, flat wattle or claybush wattle, is a species of flowering plant in the family Fabaceae and is endemic to the south-west of Western Australia. It is a prostrate, sprawling or erect shrub with glabrous, straight branchlets, winged, leathery phyllodes continuous with the branchlets, spherical heads of golden yellow flowers and coiled and twisted, thinly crust-like black pods.

== Description ==
Acacia glaucoptera is a prostrate or semi-prostrate, sprawling to erect shrub that typically grows to a height of 0.3–1.5 m (1 ft 0 in – 4 ft 11 in) and often has somewhat gangling branches. The branchlets are glabrous and straight to slightly winding. The phyllodes are continuous with the branchlets, forming wings on alternate sides, each wing extending to the one below, usually 25–70 mm (0.98–2.76 in) long and 6–20 mm (0.24–0.79 in) wide, the free part of the phyllode usually 10–40 mm (0.39–1.57 in) long. The flowers are borne in a spherical head in leaf axils on a peduncle 3–18 mm (0.12–0.71 in) long, the heads 5–6 mm (0.20–0.24 in) in diameter with 30 to 80 golden yellow flowers. Flowering mainly occurs between August and December with the main flush between August and October. The pods are irregularly coiled and twisted, up to 20 mm (0.79 in) long and 2–3 mm (0.079–0.118 in) wide, thinly crusty, black and glabrous. The seeds are more or less oblong, 2.5–3.5 mm (0.098–0.138 in) long with a conical aril on the end.

== Taxonomy ==
Acacia glaucoptera was first formally described in 1855 by the botanist George Bentham in Linnaea: ein Journal für die Botanik in ihrem ganzen Umfange, oder Beiträge zur Pflanzenkunde. The specific epithet (glaucoptera) means 'grey winged', referring to the phyllodes.

This species is closely related to A. bifaria and the phyllodes resemble A. pterocaulon.

== Distribution and habitat ==
Clay wattle grows in clay and gravelly soils in woodland, shrubland and mallee from near Narrogin, south to near Manypeaks and east to Israelite Bay in the Avon Wheatbelt, Esperance Plains, Jarrah Forest and Mallee bioregions of south-western Western Australia.

== Conservation status ==
Acacia glaucoptera is listed as by 'not threatened" by the Government of Western Australia Department of Biodiversity, Conservation and Attractions.

== Use in horticulture ==
This species is often grown for its unusual wing-like phyllodes. It requires good drainage and occasional pruning to remove dead wood. It will withstand temperatures down to −7 °C.

== See also ==
- List of Acacia species
