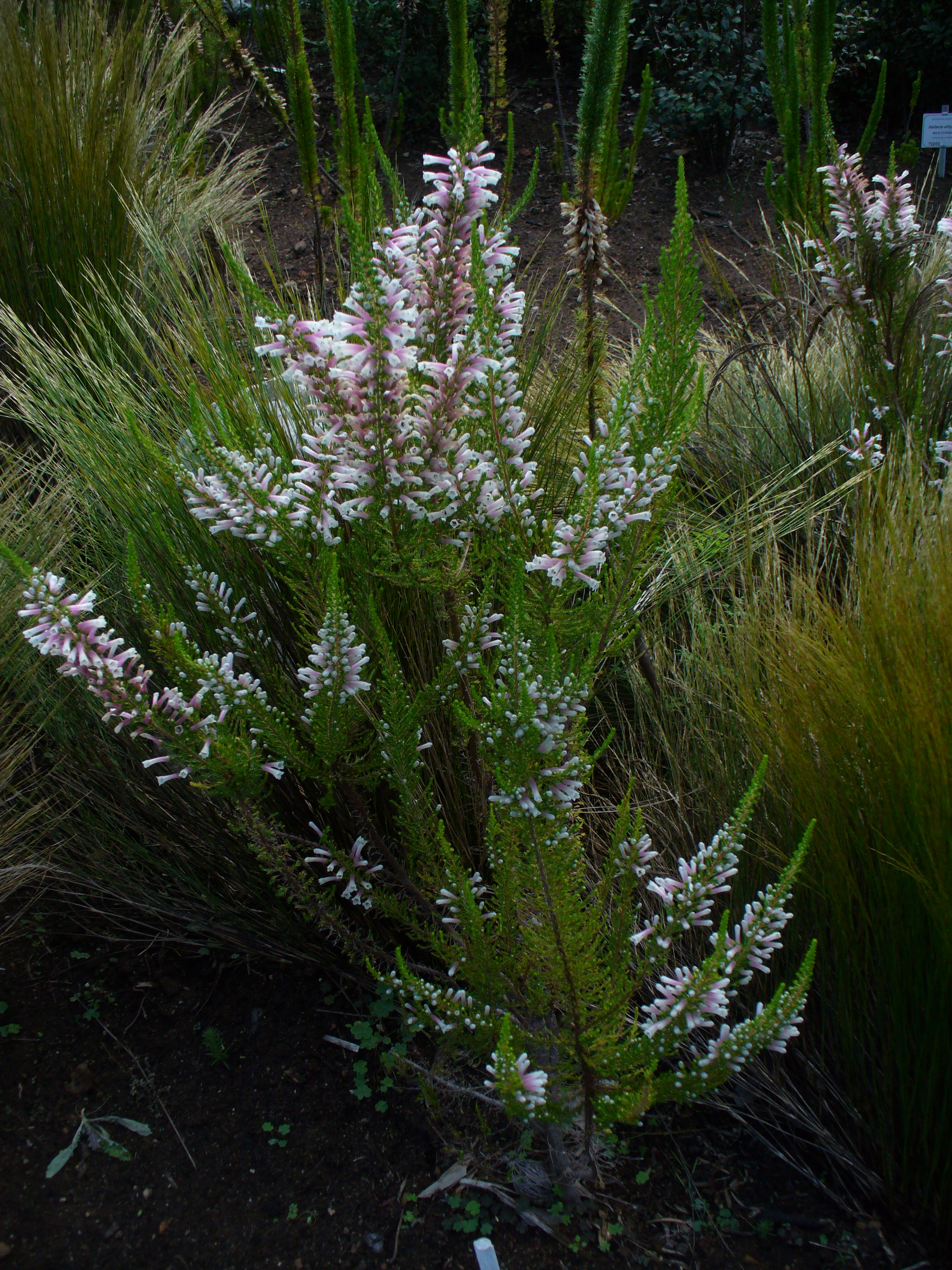

Scientific classification
- Kingdom: Plantae
- Clade: Tracheophytes
- Clade: Angiosperms
- Clade: Eudicots
- Clade: Asterids
- Order: Ericales
- Family: Ericaceae
- Genus: Erica
- Species: E. perspicua

Binomial name
- Erica perspicua J.C.Wendl.

Synonyms
- Erica bedfordiana G.Don; Erica hirsuta G.Lodd.; Erica linnaea Andrews; Erica linnaeana W.T.Aiton; Erica linnaeoides Andrews; Erica lituiflora Salisb.; Erica perspicua Andrews; Ericoides perspicuum (Andrews) Kuntze; Syringodea hirsuta G.Don; Syringodea linnaeoides (Andrews) G.Don; Syringodea lituiflora (Salisb.) G.Don

= Erica perspicua =

Species of flowering plant

Erica perspicua is a plant that belongs to the family Ericaceae and is part of the fynbos. The species is endemic to the Western Cape.
