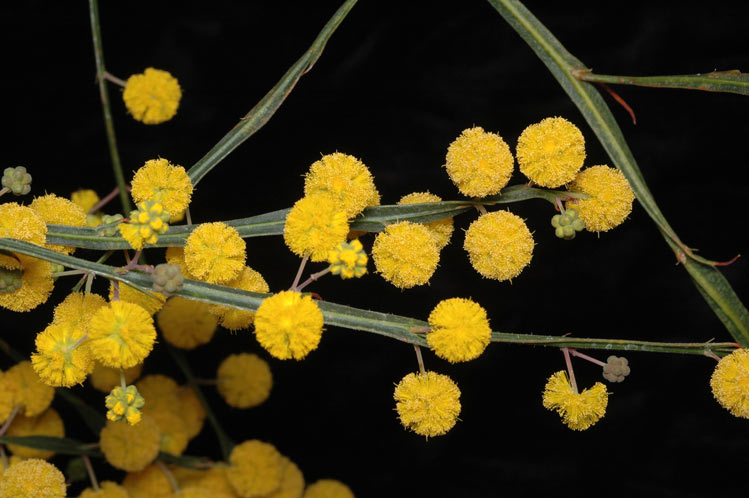
- In the ANBG

Scientific classification
- Kingdom: Plantae
- Clade: Tracheophytes
- Clade: Angiosperms
- Clade: Eudicots
- Clade: Rosids
- Order: Fabales
- Family: Fabaceae
- Subfamily: Caesalpinioideae
- Clade: Mimosoid clade
- Genus: Acacia
- Species: A. applanata

Binomial name
- Acacia applanata Maslin
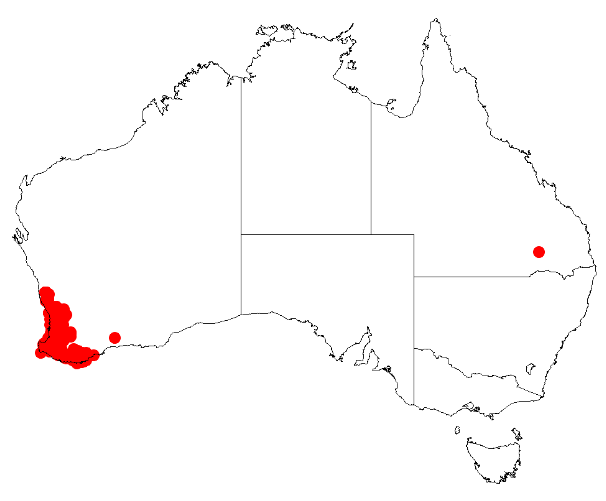
- Occurrence data from Australasian Virtual Herbarium

Synonyms
- Acacia benthamii var. angustior (Meisn.) Heynh.; Acacia diptera Lindl. nom. illeg. p.p.; Acacia diptera var. angustior Meisn.; Acacia diptera Lindl. var. diptera; ? Acacia diptera var. eriocarpa W.Fitzg.; Racosperma applanatum (Maslin) Pedley

= Acacia applanata =

Grass wattle

Species of legume

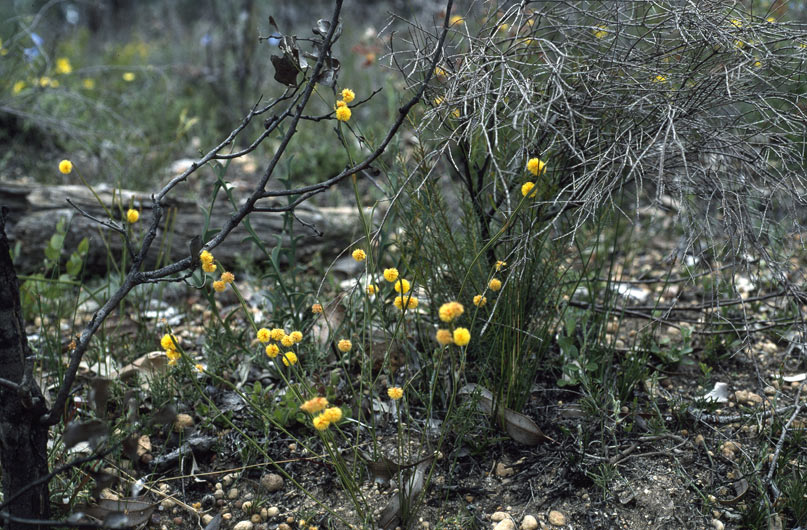
Habit near Bannister

Acacia applanata, commonly known as grass wattle, is a species of flowering plant in the family Fabaceae and is endemic to the south-west of Western Australia. It is an erect, grass-like shrub or subshrub with only a few phyllodes, continuous with the branchlets, and up to 4 racemes of spherical heads of 10 to 20, usually golden flowers, and curved, crust-like pods up to 30 mm (1.2 in) long.

== Description ==
Acacia applanata is an erect or sometimes sprawling, grass-like shrub or subshrub that typically grows to a height of 10–50 cm (3.9–19.7 in) and sometimes has weak, prostrate stems, sometimes spreading by underground suckers. It has only a few phyllodes that are continuous with branchlets, with wings 0.5–3 mm (0.020–0.118 in) long on opposite sides, the free parts of the phyllodes 1.5–5 mm (0.059–0.197 in) long. The flowers are borne in up to four racemes of spherical heads of flowers in axils on a peduncle 5–12 mm (0.20–0.47 in) long. Each head contains 10 to 20 usually golden flowers. Flowering occurs from June to October with the main flush in August and September, and the pod is a curved, flat, crust-like pod up to 30 mm (1.2 in) long and 7–8 mm (0.28–0.31 in) wide. The pods contain oblong to elliptic seeds 3–4 mm (0.12–0.16 in) long.

== Taxonomy ==
Acacia applanata was first formally described in 1995 by Bruce Maslin in the journal Nuytsia, from a specimen collected on the east side of Luyer Avenue, 75 m (246 ft) from the corner of Station street, East Cannington in 1992. The specific epithet (applanata) means 'flattened' or 'horizontally spreading' referring to the winged stems.

Until 1995, the closely related Acacia willdenowiana was considered to be the same species as A. applanata. Its foliage also resembles Acacia anomala and can hybridize with Acacia alata var. alata.

== Distribution and habitat ==
This species of Acacia grows in open woodland, woodland or forest in sand, loam or laterite, often in winter-wet depressions from near Jurien Bay to Albany, Western Australia in the Avon Wheatbelt, Esperance Plains, Geraldton Sandplains, Jarrah Forest, Swan Coastal Plain and Warren bioregions of south-western Western Australia.

== Use in horticulture ==
Grass wattle is a hardy shrub in well-drained soil, with part to full sun.

== See also ==
- List of Acacia species
