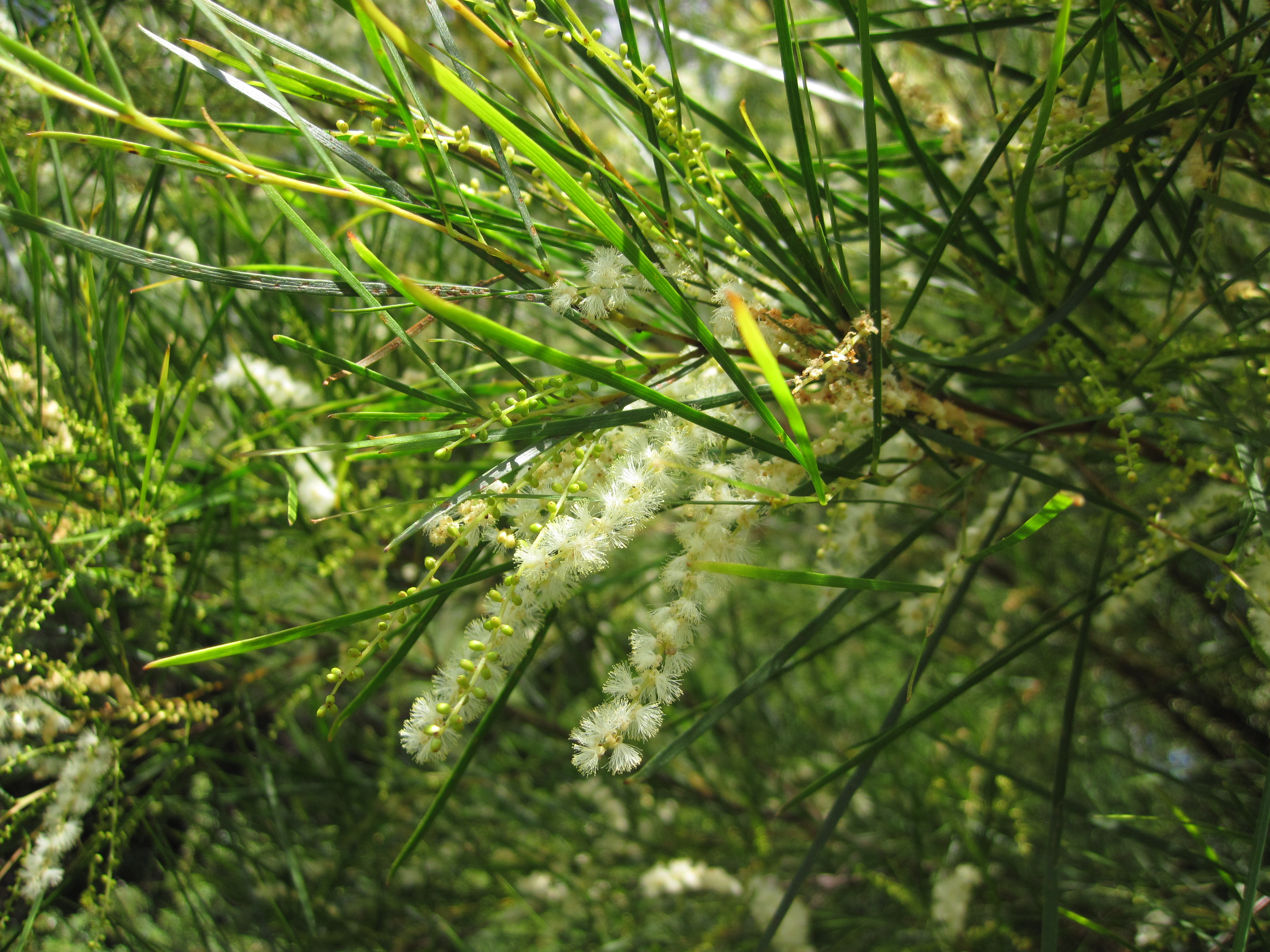

Scientific classification
- Kingdom: Plantae
- Clade: Tracheophytes
- Clade: Angiosperms
- Clade: Eudicots
- Clade: Rosids
- Order: Fabales
- Family: Fabaceae
- Subfamily: Caesalpinioideae
- Clade: Mimosoid clade
- Genus: Acacia
- Species: A. longissima

Binomial name
- Acacia longissima H.L.Wendl.
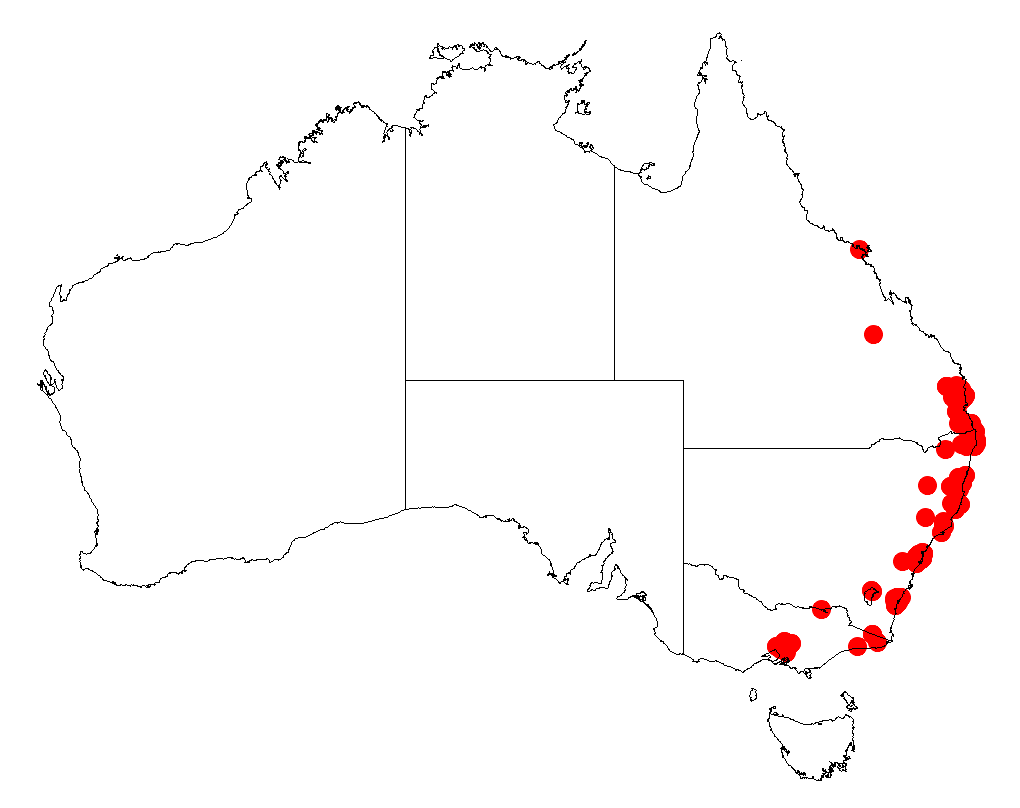
- Occurrence data from AVH

Synonyms
- Acacia linearis (J.C.Wendl.) Sims; Acacia linearis (J.C.Wendl.) Sims f. linearis; Acacia linearis f. longissima (H.L.Wendl.) Voss; Acacia linearis (J.C.Wendl.) Sims var. linearis; Acacia linearis var. longissima (H.L.Wendl.) DC.; Acacia longifolia var. linearis F.Muell. nom. inval.; Acacia longissima H.L.Wendl. var. longissima; Acacia mucronata var. linearis (Sims) Rodway p.p.; Racosperma longissimum (H.L.Wendl.) Pedley

= Acacia longissima =

Species of legume

Acacia longissima, commonly known as narrow-leaf wattle, narrow-leaved wattle or long-leaf wattle, is a species of flowering plant in the family Fabaceae and is endemic to eastern Australia. It is a slender shrub or small, spreading tree, with linear to elliptic, usually straight phyllodes, spikes of white to pale yellow flowers, and more or less terete straight to slightly curved pods, slightly constricted between the seeds.

== Description ==
Acacia longissima is slender shrub or small and spreading tree that typically grows to a height of up to 5 m (16 ft) and usually has glabrous branchlets. Its phyllodes are linear to elliptic, usually straight, 100–200 mm (3.9–7.9 in) long, 1–7 mm (0.039–0.276 in) wide, thin, dark green and glabrous with three to five main longitudinal veins, the central vein most prominent. There are thin, membranous stipules less than 0.5 mm (0.020 in) long at the base of the phyllodes. Flowering usually occurs from January to May. The pods are more or less terete, straight to slightly curved, 90–120 mm (3.5–4.7 in) long, 2–4 mm (0.079–0.157 in) wide and slightly constricted between the seeds. The seeds are narrowly elliptic, 5–6 mm (0.20–0.24 in) long and dull brown with a top-shaped aril.

== Taxonomy ==
Acacia longissima was first formally described in 1820 by Heinrich Ludolph Wendland in his Commentatio de Acaciis aphyllis. The specific epithet (longissima) is in reference to the long narrow phyllodes of this particular species.

== Distribution and habitat ==
Narrow-leaf wattle is a near-coastal species that occurs in the Nambour and Nerang districts of south-eastern Queensland with outliers at Gin Gin and Mount Nebo. It also occurs in the Mullumbimby district of far northern coast of New South Wales, extending down the coastal areas to Sydney and the Batemans Bay and Moruya areas on the south coast. It usually grows on the borders of rainforest, sometimes in gullies in wet and dry sclerophyll forest.

== Conservation status ==
Acacia longissima is listed as 'least concern' under the Queensland Government Nature Conservation Act 1992.

== See also ==
- List of Acacia species
