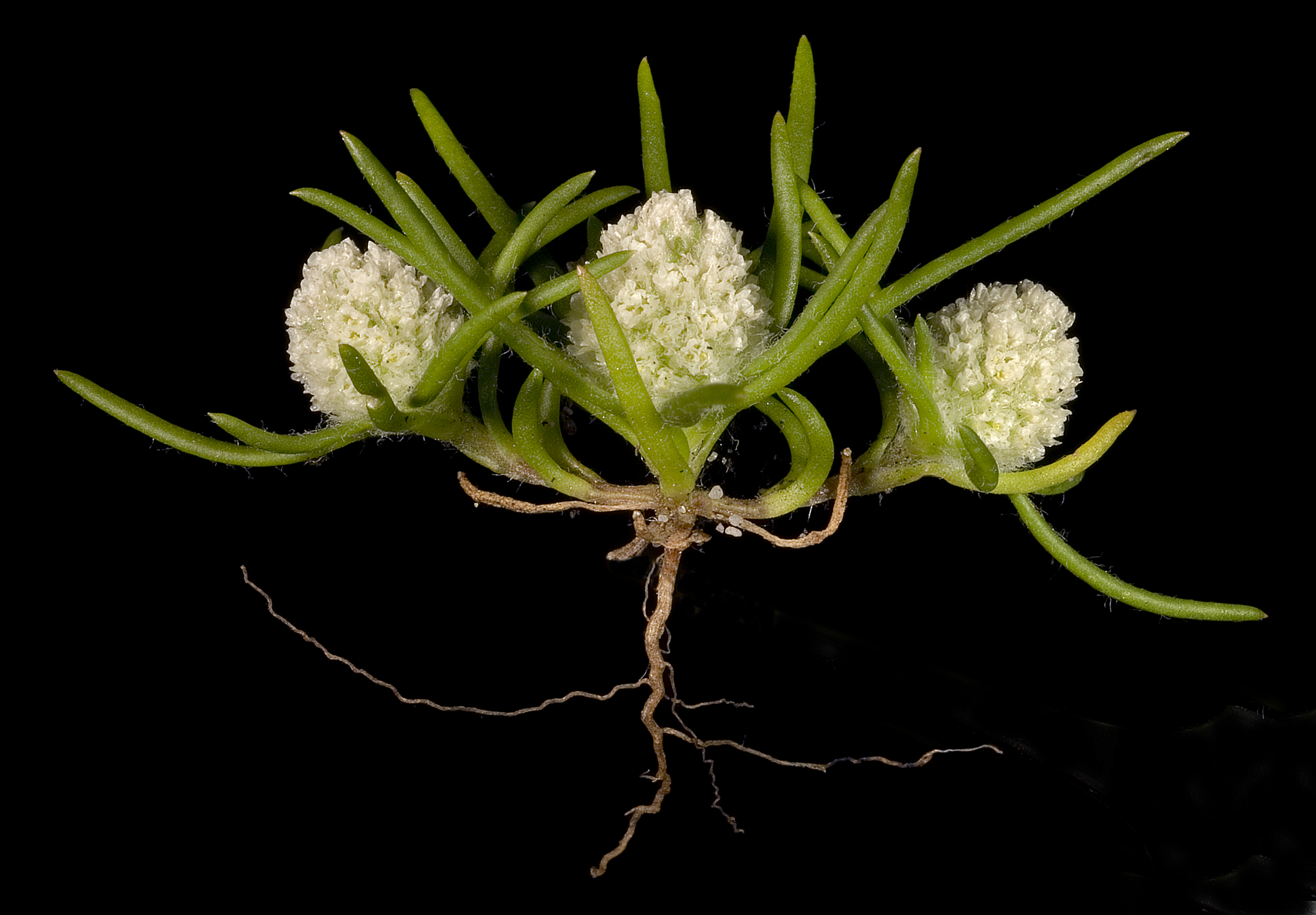
- Siloxerus humifusus

Scientific classification
- Kingdom: Plantae
- Clade: Tracheophytes
- Clade: Angiosperms
- Clade: Eudicots
- Clade: Asterids
- Order: Asterales
- Family: Asteraceae
- Subfamily: Asteroideae
- Tribe: Gnaphalieae
- Genus: Siloxerus; Labill.

Type species
- Siloxerus humifusus Labill.

Synonyms
- Styloncerus Spreng. nom. superfl.; Chamaesphaerion A.Gray; Cylindrosorus Benth.; Gyrostephium Turcz.; Hirnellia Cass.; Ogcerostylus Cass.

= Siloxerus =

Genus of plants

Siloxerus is a genus of Australian plants in the tribe Gnaphalieae within the family Asteraceae endemic to Australia. Plants in the genus usually have leaves in a rosette at the base of the plant or sessile stem leaves, and disc-like compounds heads of bisexual, tube-shaped yellowish flowers. The fruit is an oval, often purplish cypsela with a scaly white pappus.

The following species of Siloxerus are accepted by Plants of the World Online as of November 2025:

- Siloxerus filifolius (Benth.) Ostenf.
- Siloxerus humifusus Labill.
- Siloxerus multiflorus (Nees) Entwisle
- Siloxerus pygmaeus (A.Gray) P.S.Short
- Siloxerus tomentosus (J.C.Wendl.) Ostenf.
