= Acmadenia alternifolia =

Conservation status
- Vulnerable (SANBI Red List)

Scientific classification
- Kingdom: Plantae
- Clade: Embryophytes
- Clade: Tracheophytes
- Clade: Spermatophytes
- Clade: Angiosperms
- Clade: Eudicots
- Clade: Rosids
- Order: Sapindales
- Family: Rutaceae
- Genus: Acmadenia
- Species: A. alternifolia

Binomial name
- Acmadenia alternifolia Cham.

Species of plant

Acmadenia alternifolia is a shrub belonging to the Rutaceae family. The species is endemic to South Africa and occurs in the Western Cape. The plant has a range of 1357 km^{2}. It is found along the coast from Knysna to Plettenberg Bay and there is also a strip inland from Bergplaas to Nature's Valley. There are ten known populations and some of them are threatened by invasive species. The plant is part of the fynbos ecoreigion.
