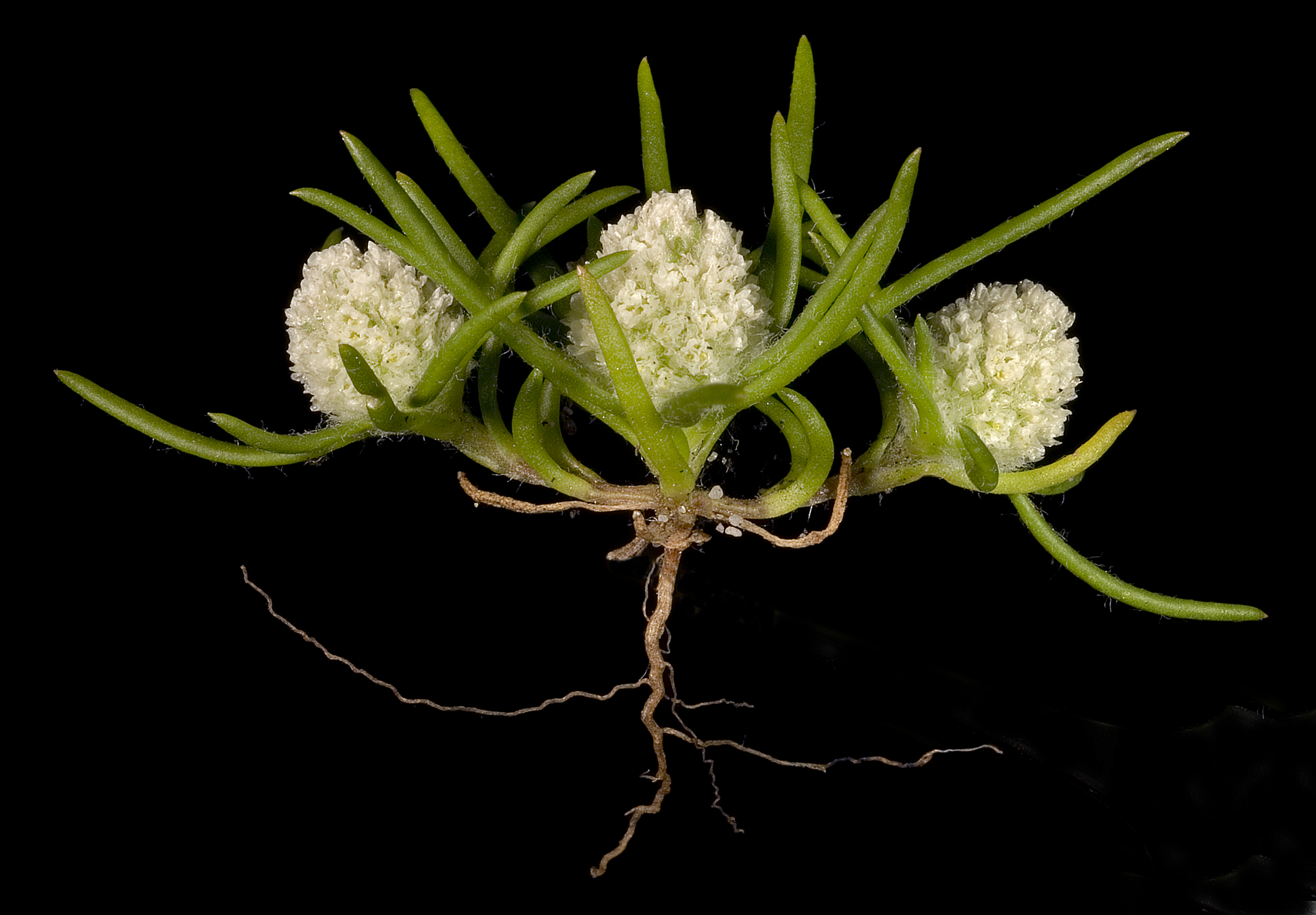

Scientific classification
- Kingdom: Plantae
- Clade: Tracheophytes
- Clade: Angiosperms
- Clade: Eudicots
- Clade: Asterids
- Order: Asterales
- Family: Asteraceae
- Genus: Siloxerus
- Species: S. humifusus

Binomial name
- Siloxerus humifusus Labill.

= Siloxerus humifusus =

Species of flowering plant

Siloxerus humifusus is a species of plant in the tribe Gnaphalieae within the family Asteraceae native to Western Australia. It was first described in 1806 by Jacques Labillardière.

It is an annual herb, growing to heights of 1 cm to 15 cm on sandy soils in moist places. Its white to cream flowers may be seen from September to January.
