= Acmadenia argillophila =

Conservation status
- Near Threatened (SANBI Red List)

Scientific classification
- Kingdom: Plantae
- Clade: Embryophytes
- Clade: Tracheophytes
- Clade: Spermatophytes
- Clade: Angiosperms
- Clade: Eudicots
- Clade: Rosids
- Order: Sapindales
- Family: Rutaceae
- Genus: Acmadenia
- Species: A. argillophila

Binomial name
- Acmadenia argillophila I.Williams

Species of plant

Acmadenia argillophila is a small shrub belonging to the Rutaceae family. The species is endemic to South Africa and occurs in the Western Cape from the Touws River and the eastern side of the Waboomsberg to the Elandsberg north of the Klein Swartberg. There are up to seven known populations that are threatened by overgrazing, mining and erosion. The species is part of the renosterveld and fynbos ecoregion.
