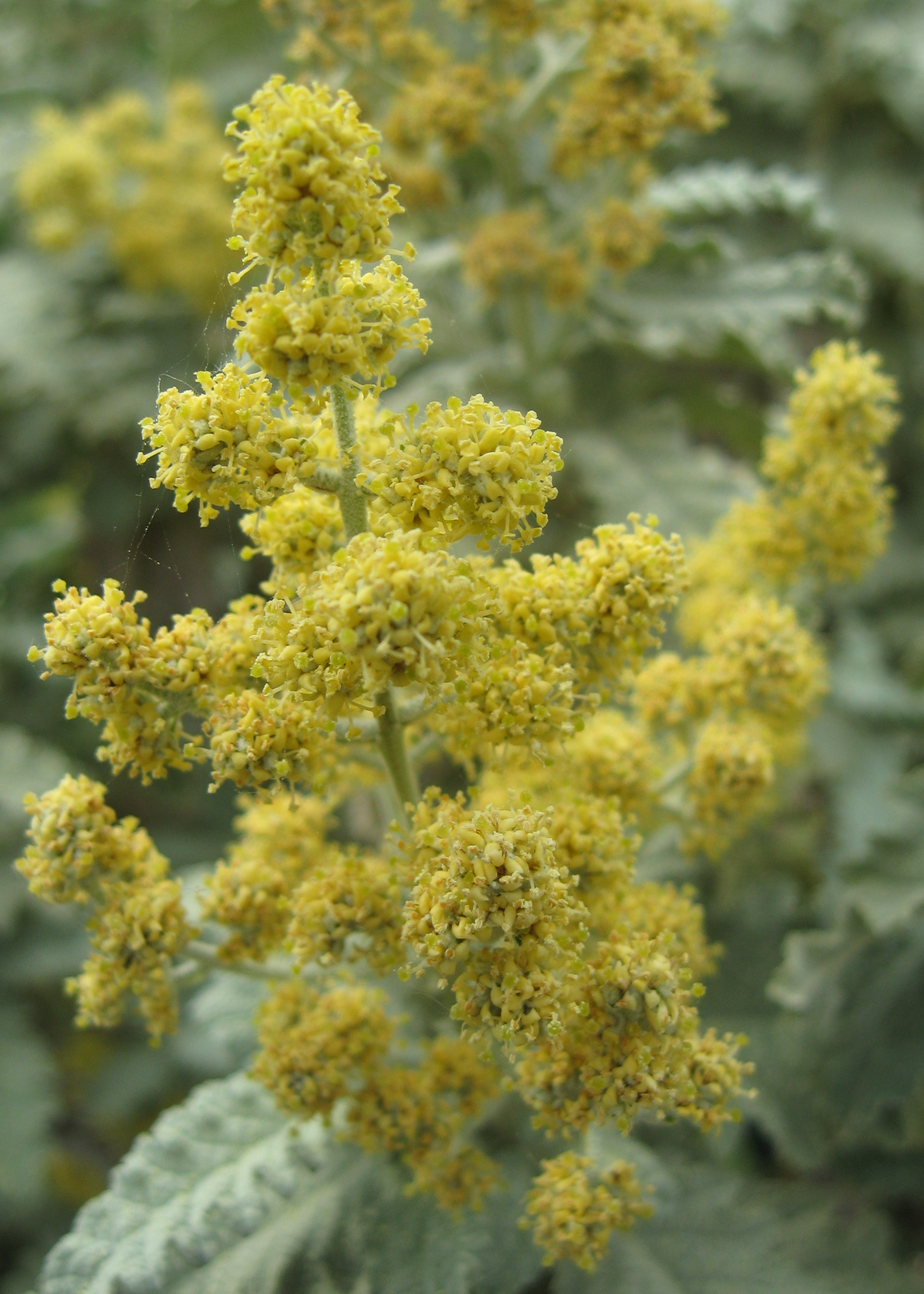
- Buddleja glomerata inflorescence

Scientific classification
- Kingdom: Plantae
- Clade: Embryophytes
- Clade: Tracheophytes
- Clade: Spermatophytes
- Clade: Angiosperms
- Clade: Eudicots
- Clade: Asterids
- Order: Lamiales
- Family: Scrophulariaceae
- Genus: Buddleja
- Species: B. glomerata

Binomial name
- Buddleja glomerata H. L. Wendl.

Synonyms
- Buddleja lobulata (Benth.) Phillips; Chilianthus lobulatus (Benth.) A. D. C.; Nuxia lobulata Benth.

= Buddleja glomerata =

Species of flowering plant

Buddleja glomerata is a shrub endemic to the mountains of the Karoo desert in South Africa, where it grows among boulders on dry hillsides. The species was first described and named by Heinrich Wendland in 1825. The shrub has a number of common names locally, the most popular being 'Karoo Sagewood'.

== Description ==
Buddleja glomerata typically grows to 1–3.5 metres (3 ft 3 in – 11 ft 6 in) in height, with white-tomentose branchlets. The leaves are opposite, ovate or elliptic, 1.5–8.5 centimetres (0.59–3.35 in) long by 0.7–4 centimetres (0.28–1.57 in) wide, heavily lobed to form undulate margins; the petiole 0.2–1.3 centimetres (0.079–0.512 in). Silver-grey on emergence, the leaves turn bluish-green with age. The inflorescence is a terminal panicle < 15 centimetres (5.9 in) in diameter, comprising congested cymes forming sub-globose heads of 10–20 faintly-scented yellow flowers, the yellow anthers protruding from the corollas. In the UK, the flowers emerge in May, thence sporadically throughout the summer.

== Cultivation ==
The shrub was introduced to commerce in the UK in the late 1990s, where it has proven hardy down to −7 °C (19 °F) grown against a south-facing wall. The species is grown as part of the NCCPG national collection held by Longstock Park Nursery, near Stockbridge, Hampshire. Hardiness: USDA zones 8–9.
