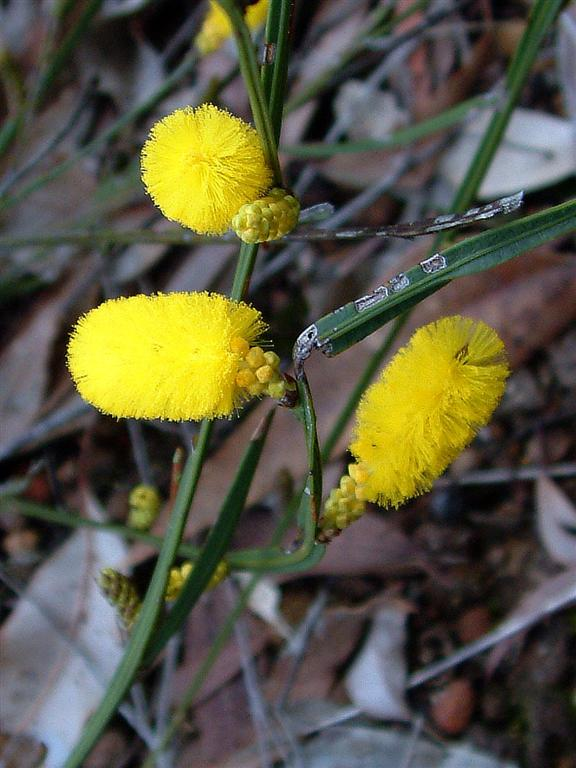

Conservation status
- Vulnerable (EPBC Act)

Scientific classification
- Kingdom: Plantae
- Clade: Embryophytes
- Clade: Tracheophytes
- Clade: Spermatophytes
- Clade: Angiosperms
- Clade: Eudicots
- Clade: Rosids
- Order: Fabales
- Family: Fabaceae
- Subfamily: Caesalpinioideae
- Clade: Mimosoid clade
- Genus: Acacia
- Species: A. anomala

Binomial name
- Acacia anomala C.A.Gardner ex Court
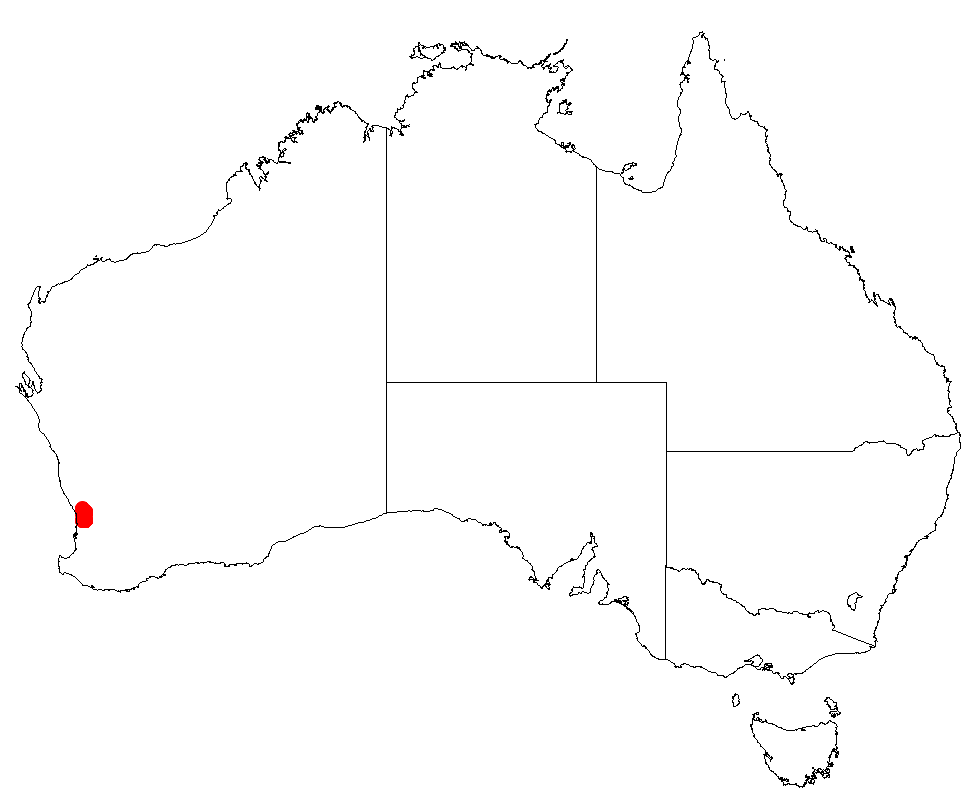
- Occurrence data from AVH

Synonyms
- Racosperma anomalum (C.A.Gardner ex Court) Pedley

= Acacia anomala =

Species of legume

Acacia anomala, commonly known as Chittering grass wattle or grass wattle, is a species of flowering plant in the family Fabaceae and is endemic to a small area along the west coast of Western Australia. It is an erect, rush-like shrub mostly with a few linear to narrow elliptic phyllodes, spikes of golden-yellow flowers, and linear pods up to 50 mm (2.0 in) long.

== Description ==
Acacia anomala has a slender rush-like habit and typically grows to a height of 0.2 to 0.5 metres (0.7 to 1.6 ft). Its upper stems are glabrous and have narrow wings similar to those of Acacia applanata. Its few phyllodes are linear to narrowly elliptic, 40 to 100 millimetres (1.6 to 3.9 in) long and 2 to 6 millimetres (0.08 to 0.24 in) wide, or sometimes absent. Its flowers are borne in spikes, mostly 10–30 mm (0.39–1.18 in) long on a peduncle 1–4 mm (0.039–0.157 in) long and are golden-yellow. There are dark brown bracteoles prominent at the bud stage, but fall off as the flowers open. Flowering occurs in August and September and the pods are linear, crusty, glabrous, up to 50 mm (2.0 in) long and 3–4 mm (0.12–0.16 in) wide with oblong seeds about 2.5 mm (0.098 in) long.

== Taxonomy ==
Acacia anomala was first formally described in 1978 by Arthur Bertram Court in the journal Nuytsia from specimens collected by Charles Austin Gardner and H.H.Kretchmar in 1961 between Muchea and Chittering. The specific epithet (anomala), means 'anomalous' or 'abnormal', because the plant has characteristics of two related species.

In 2003, Leslie Pedley transferred this species to the genus Racosperma as R. anomalum in the journal Austrobaileya, but that name was not recognised by the Australian Plant Census when the dispute regarding the name Acacia was resolved in the International Botanical Congress. (See Acacia.)

== Distribution ==
Chittering grass wattle has a very small range, confined to an area between Chittering, Swan and Kalamunda where it grows on the slopes of the Darling Range in lateritic soils. It is mostly found as part of Eucalyptus woodland communities.

== See also ==
- List of Acacia species
