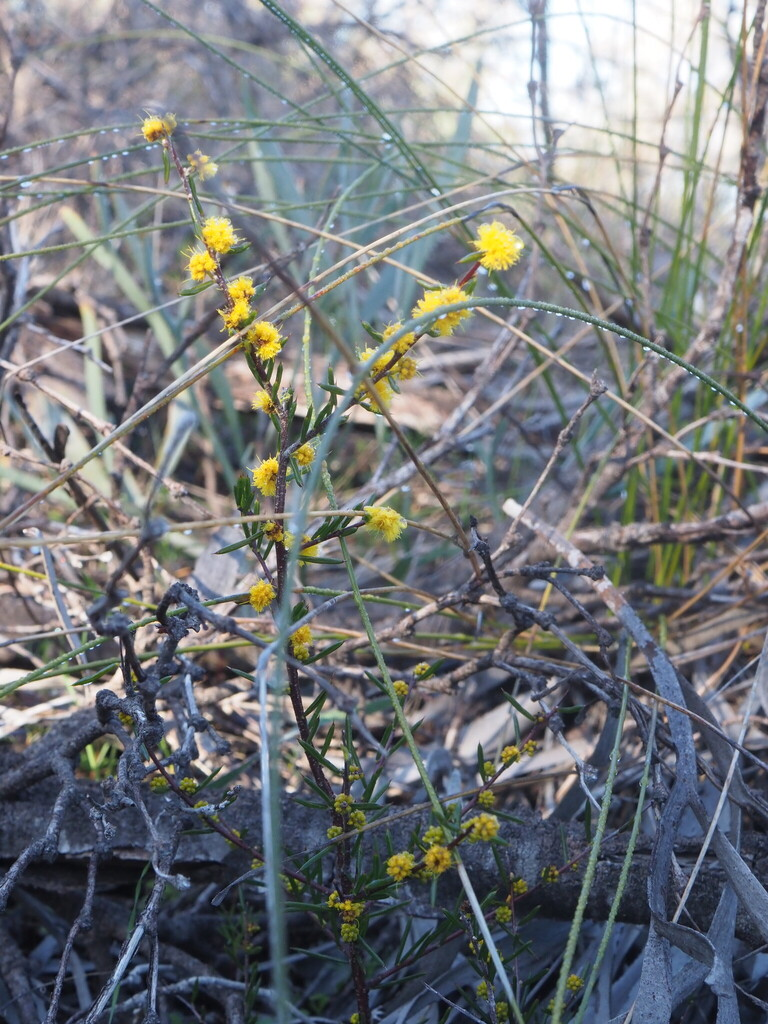
- In a suburb of eastern Perth

Scientific classification
- Kingdom: Plantae
- Clade: Embryophytes
- Clade: Tracheophytes
- Clade: Spermatophytes
- Clade: Angiosperms
- Clade: Eudicots
- Clade: Rosids
- Order: Fabales
- Family: Fabaceae
- Subfamily: Caesalpinioideae
- Clade: Mimosoid clade
- Genus: Acacia
- Species: A. sessilis

Binomial name
- Acacia sessilis Benth.
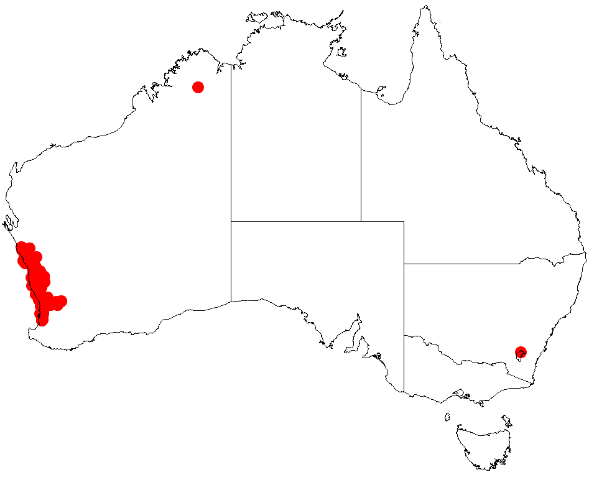
- Occurrence data from AVH

= Acacia sessilis =

Species of legume

Acacia sessilis is a shrub of the genus Acacia and the subgenus Phyllodineae that is endemic to south western Australia.

== Description ==
The diffuse, straggly and pungent shrub typically grows to a height of 0.3 to 1.0 metre (1.0 to 3.3 ft). It has spiny branchlets that are covered in small woolly hairs with caducous stipules. Like most species of Acacia it has phyllodes rather than true leaves. The rigid and pungent, patent to erect phyllodes are 7 to 25 mm (0.28 to 0.98 in) in length and 0.6 to 1.3 mm (0.024 to 0.051 in) and have one to three nerves per face. It blooms from July to October and produces yellow flowers.

== Taxonomy ==
The species was first formally described by the botanist George Bentham as a part of the William Jackson Hooker work Notes on Mimoseae, with a synopsis of species as published in the London Journal of Botany. It was reclassified as Racosperma sessile in 2003 then transferred back to genus Acacia in 2006. The specific epithet is derived from Latin meaning fit for sitting on in reference to the phyllodes or flowers growing directly from the stem without a stalk.

== Distribution ==
It is native to an area along the west coast in the Mid West, Wheatbelt and Peel regions of Western Australia where it is found growing in gravelly clay or lateritic sandy soils. It is found from around Geraldton in the north west to around Yarloop in the south east.

== See also ==
- List of Acacia species
