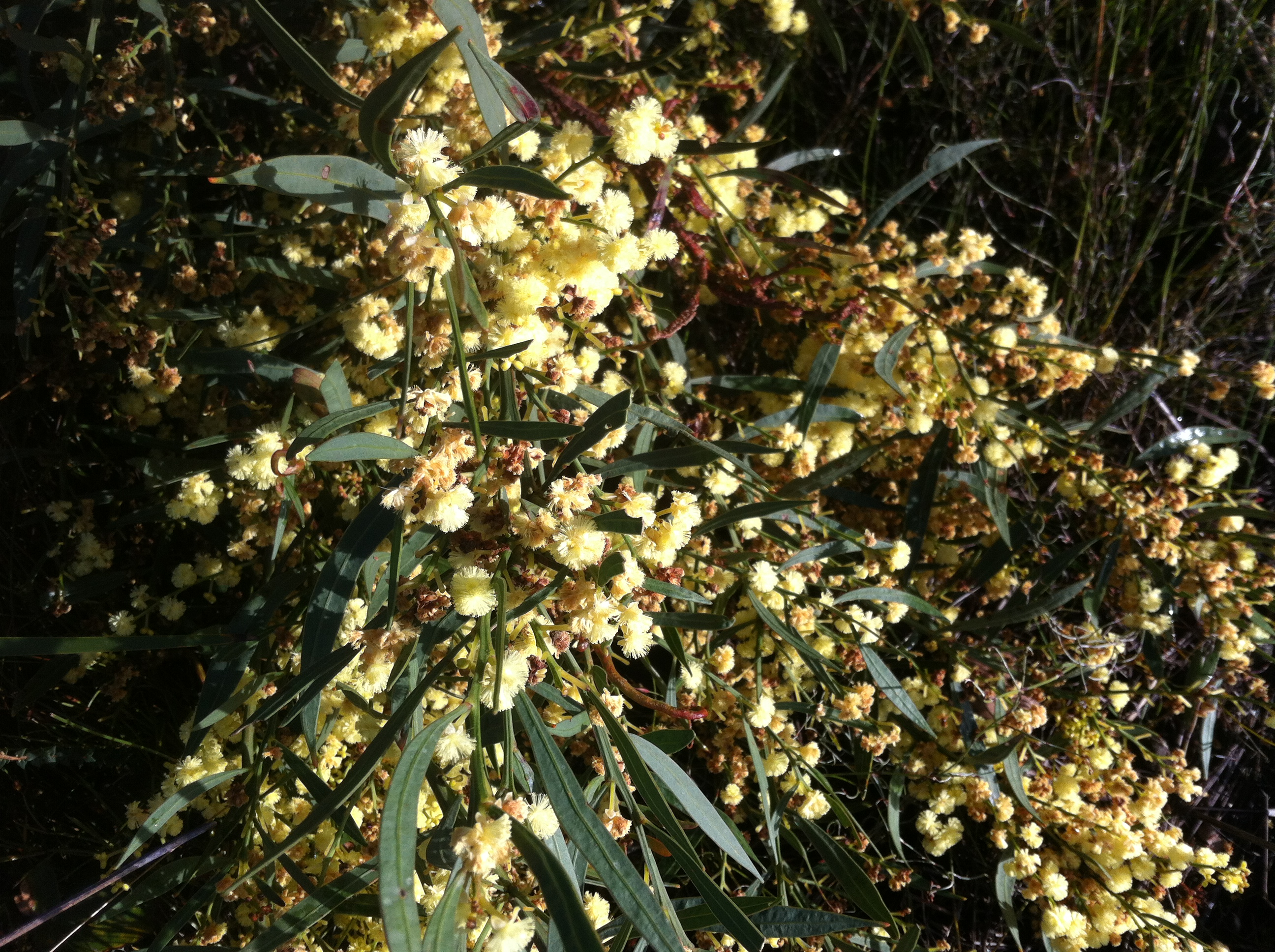
- In Gull Rock National Park

Scientific classification
- Kingdom: Plantae
- Clade: Tracheophytes
- Clade: Angiosperms
- Clade: Eudicots
- Clade: Rosids
- Order: Fabales
- Family: Fabaceae
- Subfamily: Caesalpinioideae
- Clade: Mimosoid clade
- Genus: Acacia
- Species: A. cochlearis

Binomial name
- Acacia cochlearis (Labill.) H.L.Wendl.
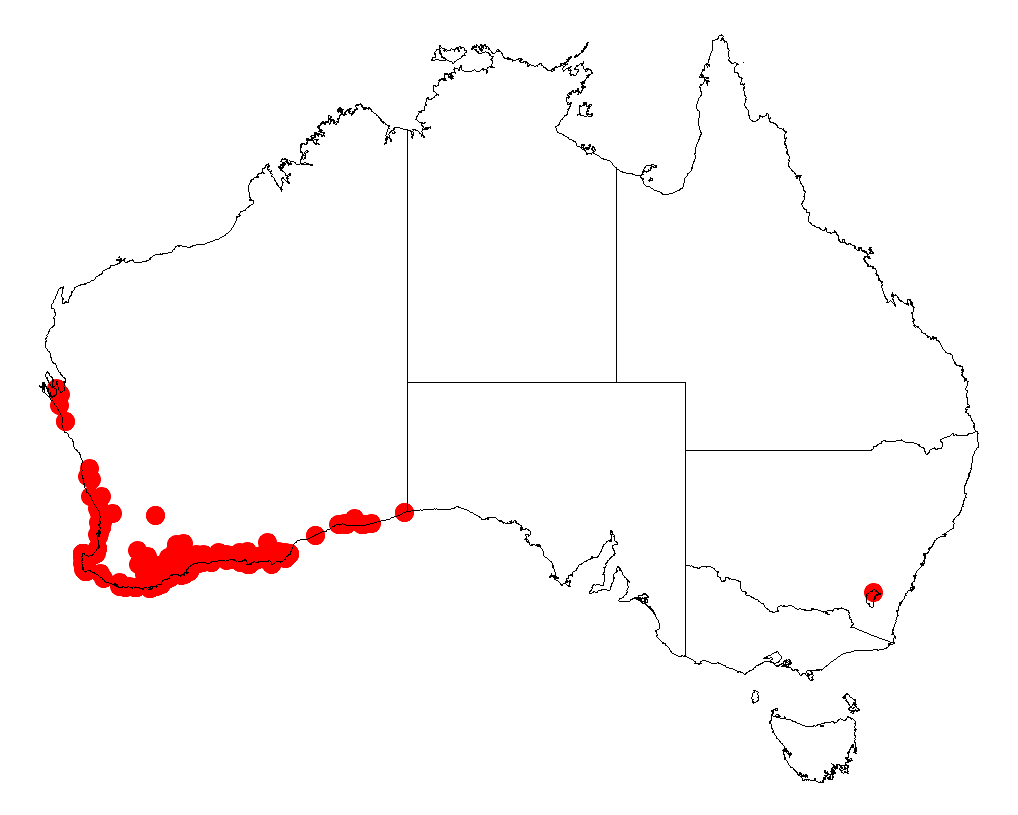
- Occurrence data from AVH

= Acacia cochlearis =

Rigid wattle

Species of legume

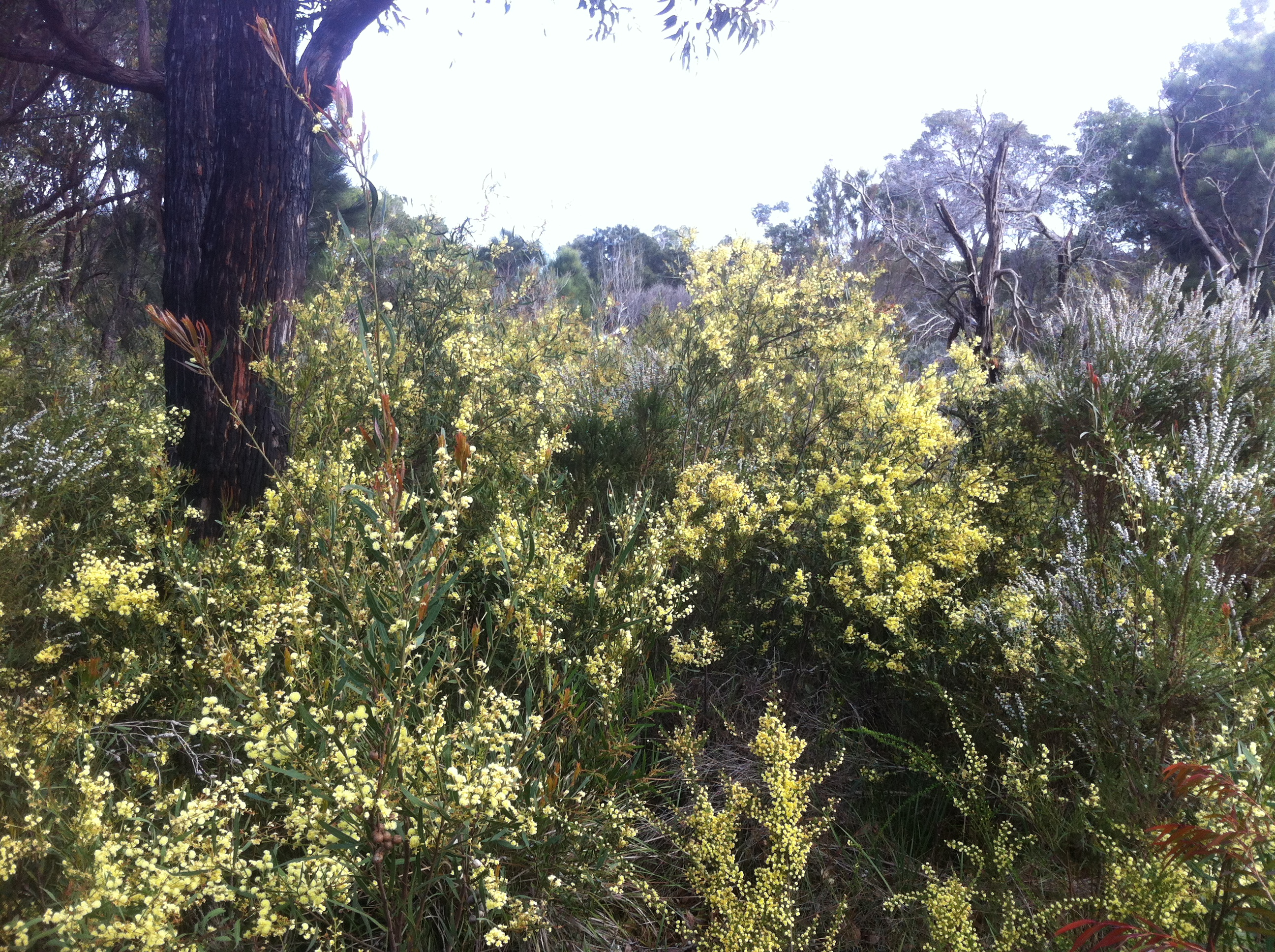
Acacia cochlearis thicket under Eucalyptus trees near Two Peoples Bay Nature Reserve

Acacia cochlearis, commonly known as rigid wattle, is a species of flowering plant in the family Fabaceae and is endemic to the south-west of Western Australia. It is a bushy, erect, sharply pointed shrub with ribbed branchlets, sessile, linear to narrowly elliptic or oblong phyllodes, spherical heads of deep golden yellow flowers, and pendent, linear, leathery pods.

== Description ==
Acacia cochlearis is bushy, erect, sharply pointed shrub that typically grows to a height of 0.5–3 m (1 ft 8 in – 9 ft 10 in), and has ribbed branchlets that are glabrous or sparsely covered with straight, soft hairs pressed against the surface. Its phyllodes are sessile, tapering-linear, narrowly elliptic or oblong, straight to curved, mostly 20–50 mm (0.79–1.97 in) long and 2–10 mm (0.079–0.394 in) wide, sharply pointed, thinly leathery to almost rigid, with up to three glands 5–20 mm (0.20–0.79 in) above the base of the phyllodes. Stipules are present only on new, young shoots.

The flowers are borne in up to three spherical heads on peduncles 3.5–8 mm (0.14–0.31 in) long, each head 4–5 mm (0.16–0.20 in) in diameter with 30 to 50 deep golden yellow flowers. Flowering occurs from July to October, and the pods are pendent, linear, leathery, more or less raised over the seeds, up to 45 mm (1.8 in) long and 3–5 mm (0.12–0.20 in) wide with soft hairs pressed against the surface. Each pod contains 10 to 15 oval seeds 3 mm (0.12 in) long, dull and mottled black with a helmet-shaped aril.

== Taxonomy ==
This species was first formally described in 1807 by the botanist Jacques Labillardière who gave it the name Mimosa cochlearis in his Novae Hollandiae Plantarum Specimen. In 1820, Heinrich Wendland transferred the species to Acacia as A. cochlearis in his Commentatio de Acaciis aphyllis. The specific epithet (cochlearis) means 'a spoon', and refers to the shaped of the sepals.

== Distribution and habitat ==
Rigid wattle grows in sandy soils and is found in coastal areas on sandplains and sand dunes. It grows in coastal areas from Lancelin to Israelite Bay in the Avon Wheatbelt, Esperance Plains, Geraldton Sandplains, Hampton, Jarrah Forest, Mallee, Swan Coastal Plain, Warren and Yalgoo bioregions of south-western Western Australia, where it is found growing as solitary plants or in dense thickets.

== Uses ==
The shrub is sold as a suitable medium size shrub for gardens in coastal regions or areas with sandy soils. It is also used to stabilise dune or coastal areas. A. cochlearis establishes quickly and reliably in stabilised soils. Although it is must be protected from high winds it is utilised in mixed plantings with other species such as Acacia rostellifera and Scaevola crassifolia. It is an indicator of good quality dunes as the species is vulnerable to disturbance once established.

== Use in horticulture ==
Acacia cochlearis can be grown from seed. The seeds should be soaked in hot water or lightly abraded with fine sandpaper prior to planting. They should be sown in free draining soil and can benefit from the addition of disease-free soil from existing plants to transfer the Rhizobium bacteria that are important in nitrogen fixation. Plants require a position in full sun.

== See also ==
- List of Acacia species
