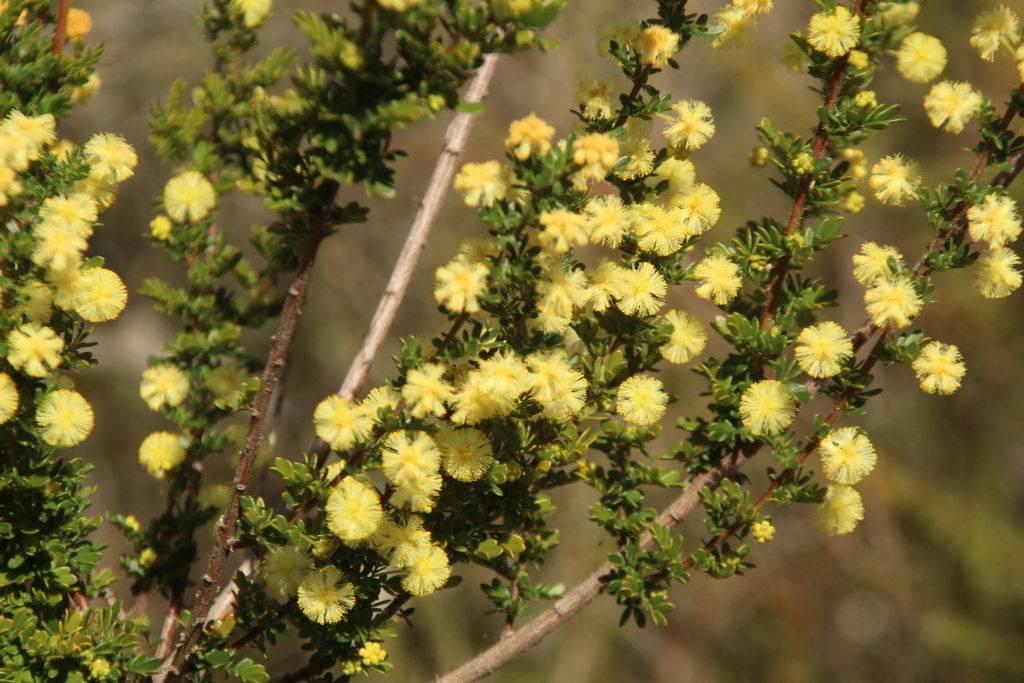
- Near Albany

Scientific classification
- Kingdom: Plantae
- Clade: Tracheophytes
- Clade: Angiosperms
- Clade: Eudicots
- Clade: Rosids
- Order: Fabales
- Family: Fabaceae
- Subfamily: Caesalpinioideae
- Clade: Mimosoid clade
- Genus: Acacia
- Species: A. browniana

Binomial name
- Acacia browniana H.L.Wendl.
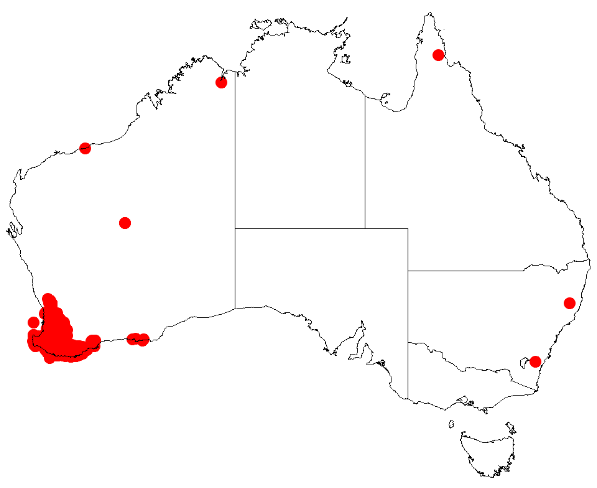
- Occurrence data from AVH

Synonyms
- Acacia ciliata R.Br. nom. illeg. p.p.; Acacia strigosa Link nom. illeg., nom. superfl.; Acacia strigosa Link f. strigosa; Acacia strigosa Linkvar. strigosa; Mimosa ciliata Poir. nom. illeg.; Racosperma brownianum (H.L.Wendl.) Pedley

= Acacia browniana =

Brown's wattle

Species of plant

Acacia browniana, commonly known as Brown's wattle, is a species of flowering plant in the family Fabaceae and is endemic to the south-west of Western Australia. It is a shrub with bipinnate leaves, cream-coloured to golden yellow flowers arranged in spherical heads, and narrowly oblong, crust-like pods.

== Description ==
Acacia browniana is a shrub that typically grows to a height of 0.3–2 m (1 ft 0 in – 6 ft 7 in) and sometimes has hairy branchlets. The leaves are bipinnate with mostly two pairs of leaflets on a rachis 1–10 mm (0.039–0.394 in) long, the lower two pinnae usually 1–4 mm (0.039–0.157 in) long and the outer pinnae 2–30 mm (0.079–1.181 in) long. The lower pinnae have one to three pinnules and the outer pinnae two to nine pinnules, each more or less oblong, 2–10 mm (0.079–0.394 in) long and 1–4 mm (0.039–0.157 in) wide. There is a sessile gland on the rachis at the base of the pinnae.

The flowers are borne in one or two spherical heads 4–6 mm (0.16–0.24 in) in diameter in leaf axils on a peduncle 5–20 mm (0.20–0.79 in) long. Each head has 12 to 21 cream-coloured to golden-yellow flowers. Flowering occurs in May or from July to November, and the pods are usually glabrous, crust-like, narrowly oblong, 10–45 mm (0.39–1.77 in) long and 5–9 mm (0.20–0.35 in) wide with oblong to elliptic seeds 2.5–4 mm (0.098–0.157 in) wide.

== Taxonomy ==
This species was first formally described in 1813 by Robert Brown who gave it the name Acacia ciliata in Hortus Kewensis but the name was illegitimate. In 1819, Heinrich Wendland changed the name to Acacia browniana in Flora: oder Allgemeine Botanischer Zeitund.

The names of five varieties of A. browniana are accepted by the Australian Plant Census:

- Acacia browniana H.L.Wendl. var. browniana
- Acacia browniana var. endlicheri (Meisn.) Maslin (previously known as A. endlicheri)
- Acacia browniana var. glaucescens Maslin
- Acacia browniana var. intermedia (E.Pritz.) Maslin (previously known as A. strigosa var. intermedia)
- Acacia browniana var. obscura (A.DC.) Maslin (previously known as A. obscura)

The specific epithet (browniana) honours Robert Brown.

== Distribution and habitat ==
Brown's wattle is found in wet areas, near streams and creeks, on flats and ridges, on hills and on granite outcrops in the south-west of Western Australia from around Bindoon and Mogumber in the north around the coast to Augusta in the south and Manypeaks in the Avon Wheatbelt, Esperance Plains, Jarrah Forest, Swan Coastal Plain and Warren bioregions. It grows well in sandy, loamy, gravelly soils often containing laterite.

== See also ==
- List of Acacia species
