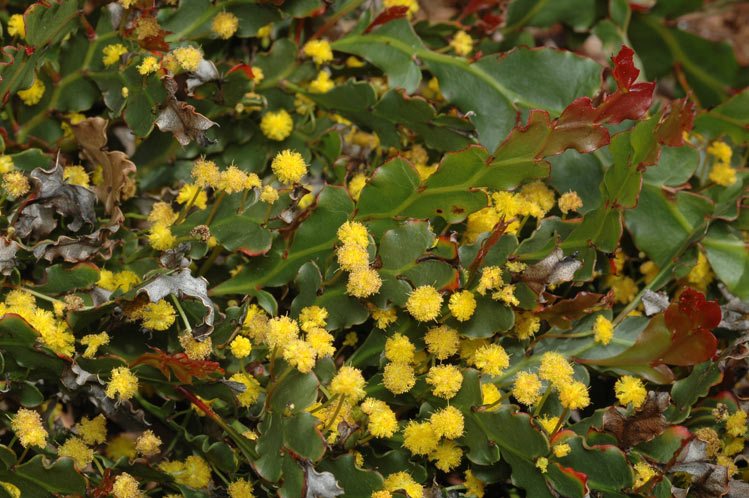
- In the ANBG

Conservation status
- Priority Three — Poorly Known Taxa (DEC)

Scientific classification
- Kingdom: Plantae
- Clade: Tracheophytes
- Clade: Angiosperms
- Clade: Eudicots
- Clade: Rosids
- Order: Fabales
- Family: Fabaceae
- Subfamily: Caesalpinioideae
- Clade: Mimosoid clade
- Genus: Acacia
- Species: A. bifaria

Binomial name
- Acacia bifaria Maslin
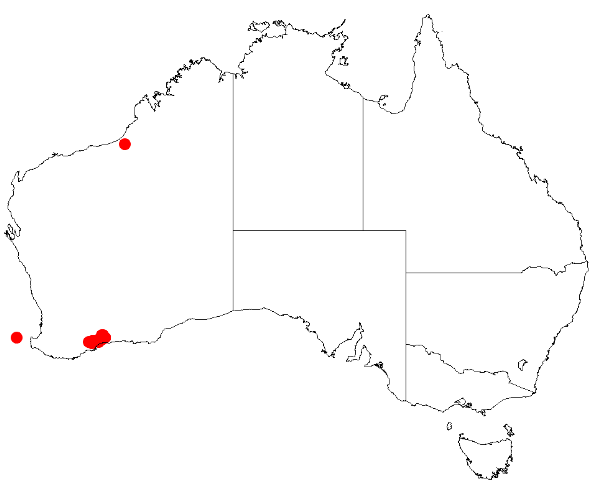
- Occurrence data from AVH

Synonyms
- Racosperma bifarium (Maslin) Pedley

= Acacia bifaria =

Species of shrub

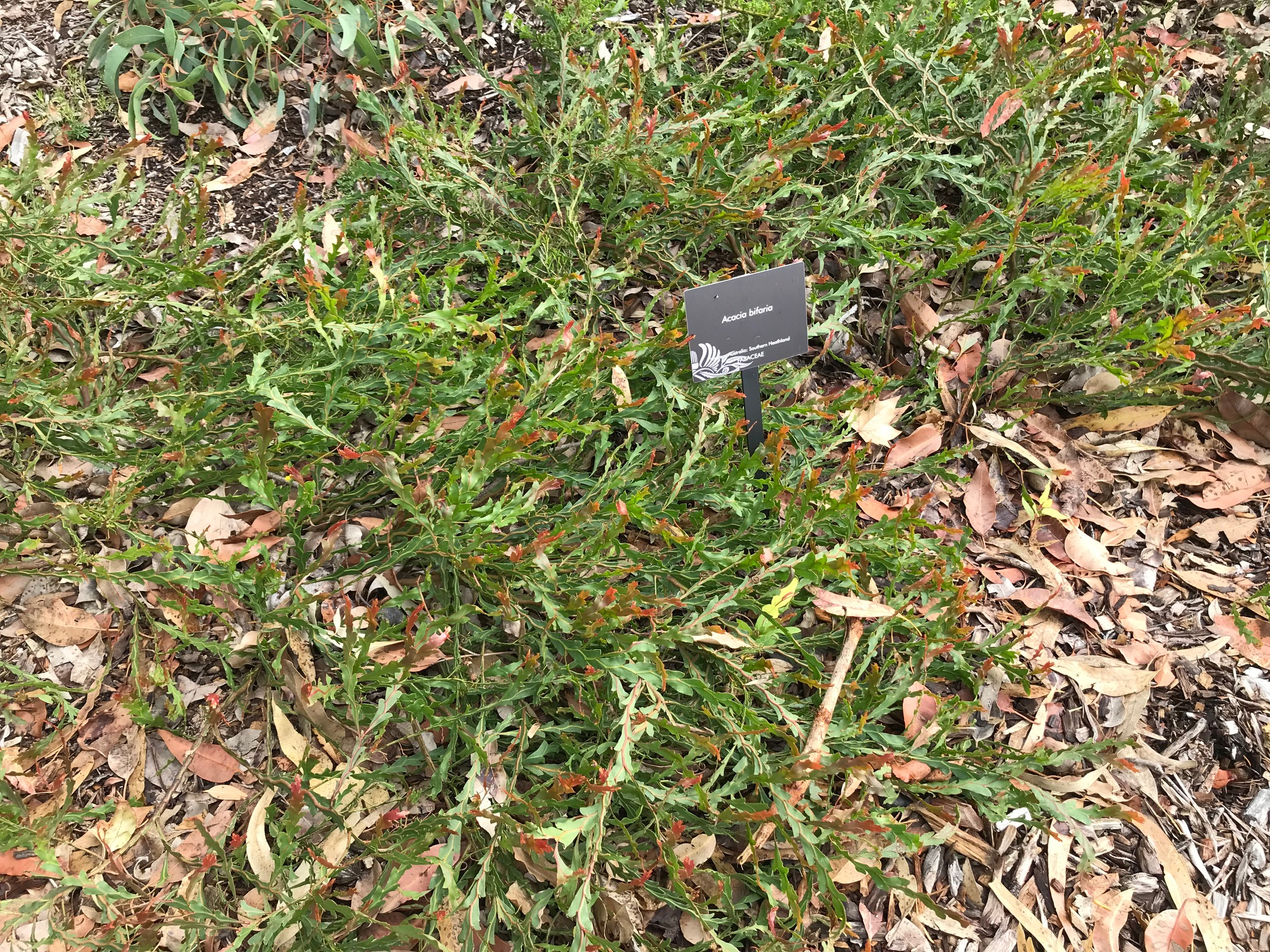
Habit in Kings Park

Acacia bifaria is a species of flowering plant in the family Fabaceae and is endemic to the far south-west of Western Australia. It is a prostrate or semi-prostrate, often domed shrub with wavy branchlets, the phyllodes continuous with the branchlets and forming wings on either side of a central axis, spherical heads of light golden-yellow flowers, and strongly curved or coiled crust-like pods.

== Description ==
Acacia bifaria is a prostrate to semi-prostrate often domed shrub. It typically grows to 30–80 cm (12–31 in) high and 2 m (6 ft 7 in) wide, its branchlets glabrous and slightly prominently wavy. The phyllodes are continuous with the branchlets, each one extending to the next below with wings on opposite sides, each phyllode is 10–35 mm (0.39–1.38 in) long and 4–10 mm (0.16–0.39 in) wide. The flowers are borne in spherical heads on a peduncle 2–12 mm (0.079–0.472 in) long with 16 to 23 light golden-yellow flowers. Flowering occurs between August and December, and the pods are strongly curved to twice-coiled, up to 20 mm (0.79 in) long and 2–3 mm (0.079–0.118 in) wide, containing oblong seeds about 3 mm (0.12 in) long with a cone-shaped aril on the end.

== Taxonomy ==
Acacia bifaria was first formally described in 1995 by the botanist Bruce Maslin in the journal Nuytsia from specimens he collected about 2 km (1.2 mi) north of Ravensthorpe in 1980. The specific epithet (bifaria) means 'in two rows', referring to the phyllodes that are in two ranks of opposite sides of the branchlet axis.

== Distribution and habitat ==
This species of wattle is found in mallee and woodland between Ravensthorpe and the Fitzgerald River in the Esperance Plains bioregion of the southern part of the south-west of Western Australia. It is often found in clay, rocky loam or sandy soils on undulating plains, low-lying areas and on roadsides.

== Conservation status ==
Acacia bifaria is listed as "Priority Three" by the Government of Western Australia Department of Biodiversity, Conservation and Attractions, meaning that it is poorly known and known from only a few locations but is not under imminent threat.

== See also ==
- List of Acacia species
