= Heinrich Wendland =

Heinrich Ludolph (Ludwig) Wendland (29 April 1791, in Hanover – 15 July 1869, in Teplice) was a botanist who described and named several Acacia species. Along with his father Johann Christoph Wendland (1755–1828) and his son Hermann Wendland (1825–1903), he was the second of three generations of Wendlands who served as court gardeners at the Königliche Herrenhäuser Gärten founded in 1638 by the Hanoverian court.

Wendland was born into a family well known in botany. His father Johann was the head court gardener of the Royal botanical garden in Herrenhausen and had published a number of botanical books including the notable "Botanische Beobachtungen nebst einigen neuen Gattungen und Arten". Heinrich studied in Göttingen after some years of apprenticeship in Vienna and London. He became a gartenmeister in 1827 and later was director of Herrenhausen Gardens at Herrenhausen, today part of Hanover. In 1820 he published "Commentatio de Acacias aphyllii", in which he authored a number of new Acacia species. He died in Teplice, Bohemia on 15 July 1869.

== Works ==
- Commentatio de Acacias aphyllii, 1820.
- Heinrich Ludolph authored a number of species, including:
  - Acacia browniana H.L.Wendl.
  - Acacia cochlearis (Labill.) H.L.Wendl.
    Rigid Wattle
  - Acacia saligna (Labill.) H.L.Wendl.
    Coojong
  - Acacia willdenowiana H.L.Wendl.
    Grass Wattle
  - Buddleja glomerata H.L.Wendl.
    Karoo Sagewood
