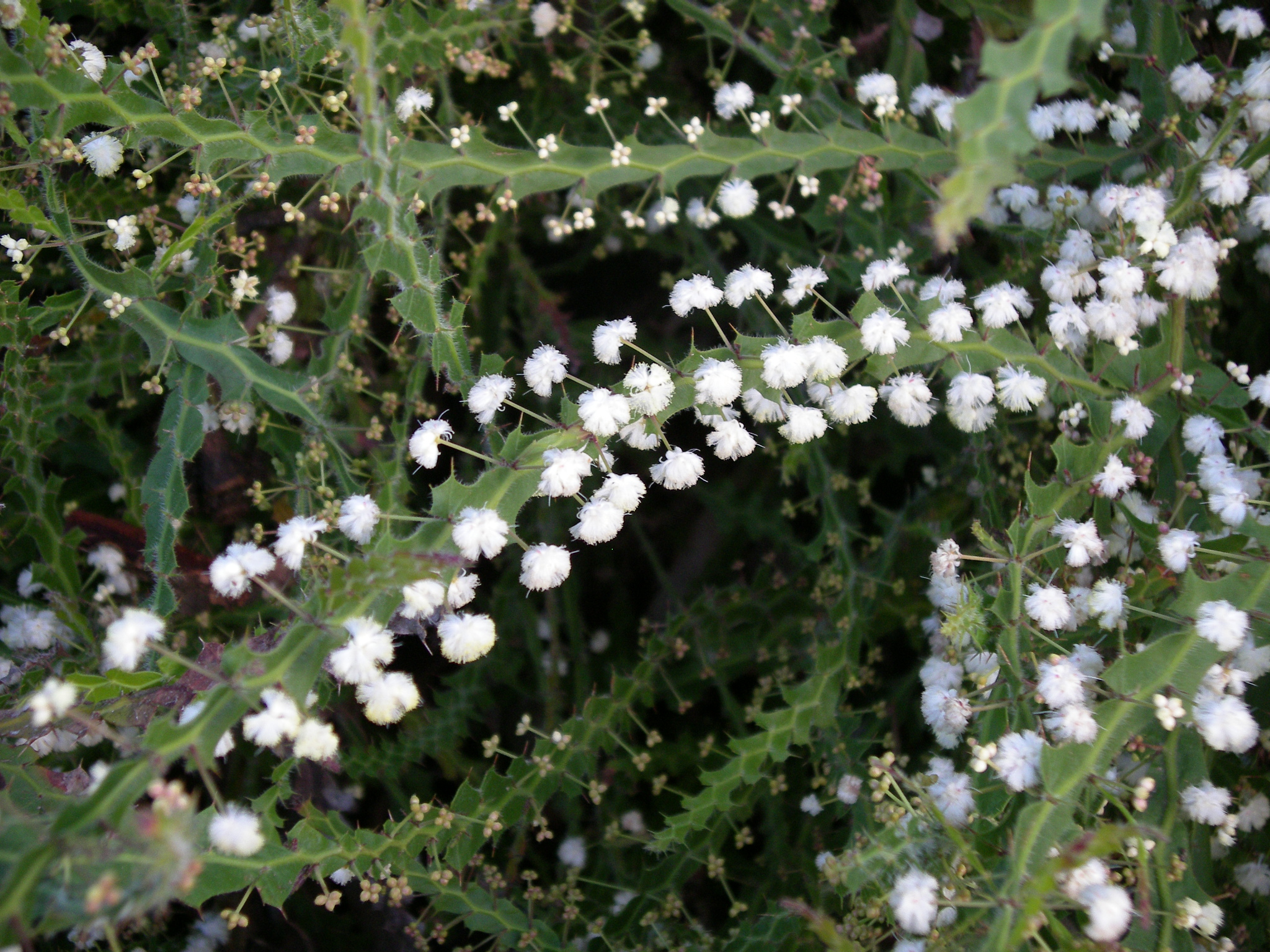

Scientific classification
- Kingdom: Plantae
- Clade: Tracheophytes
- Clade: Angiosperms
- Clade: Eudicots
- Clade: Rosids
- Order: Fabales
- Family: Fabaceae
- Subfamily: Caesalpinioideae
- Clade: Mimosoid clade
- Genus: Acacia
- Species: A. alata

Binomial name
- Acacia alata R.Br.
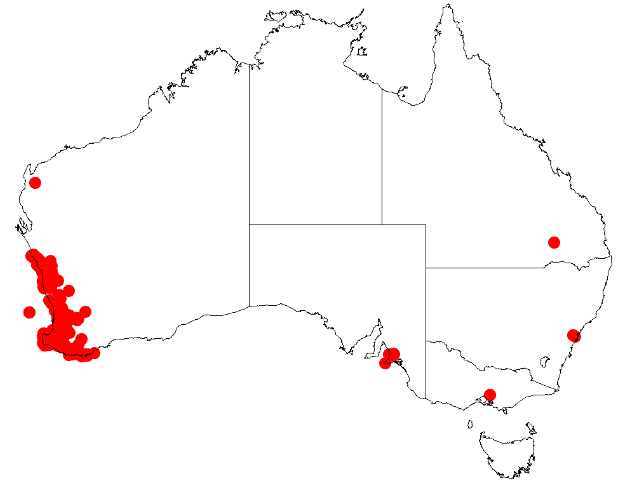
- Occurrence data from AVH

= Acacia alata =

Species of legume

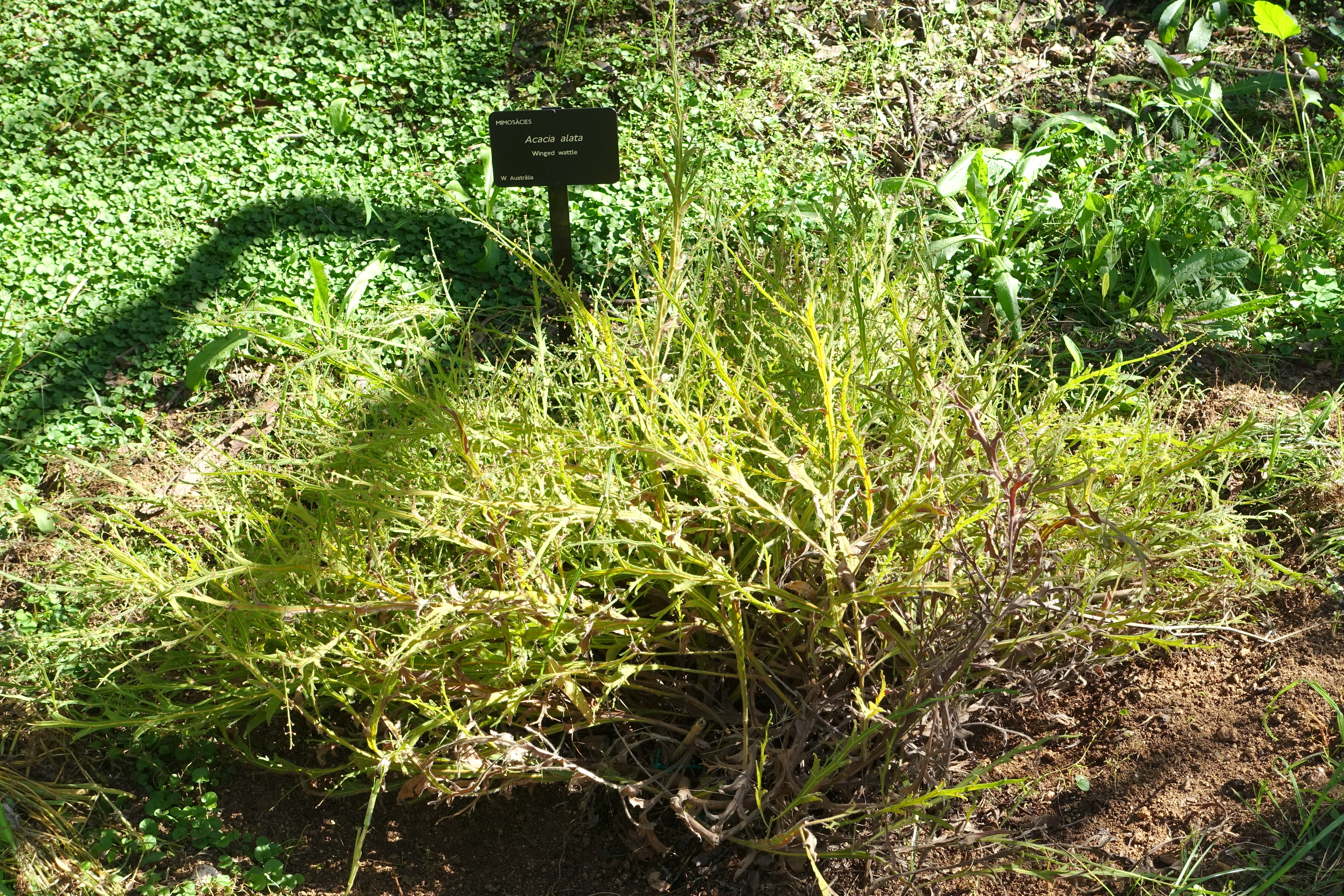
Habit

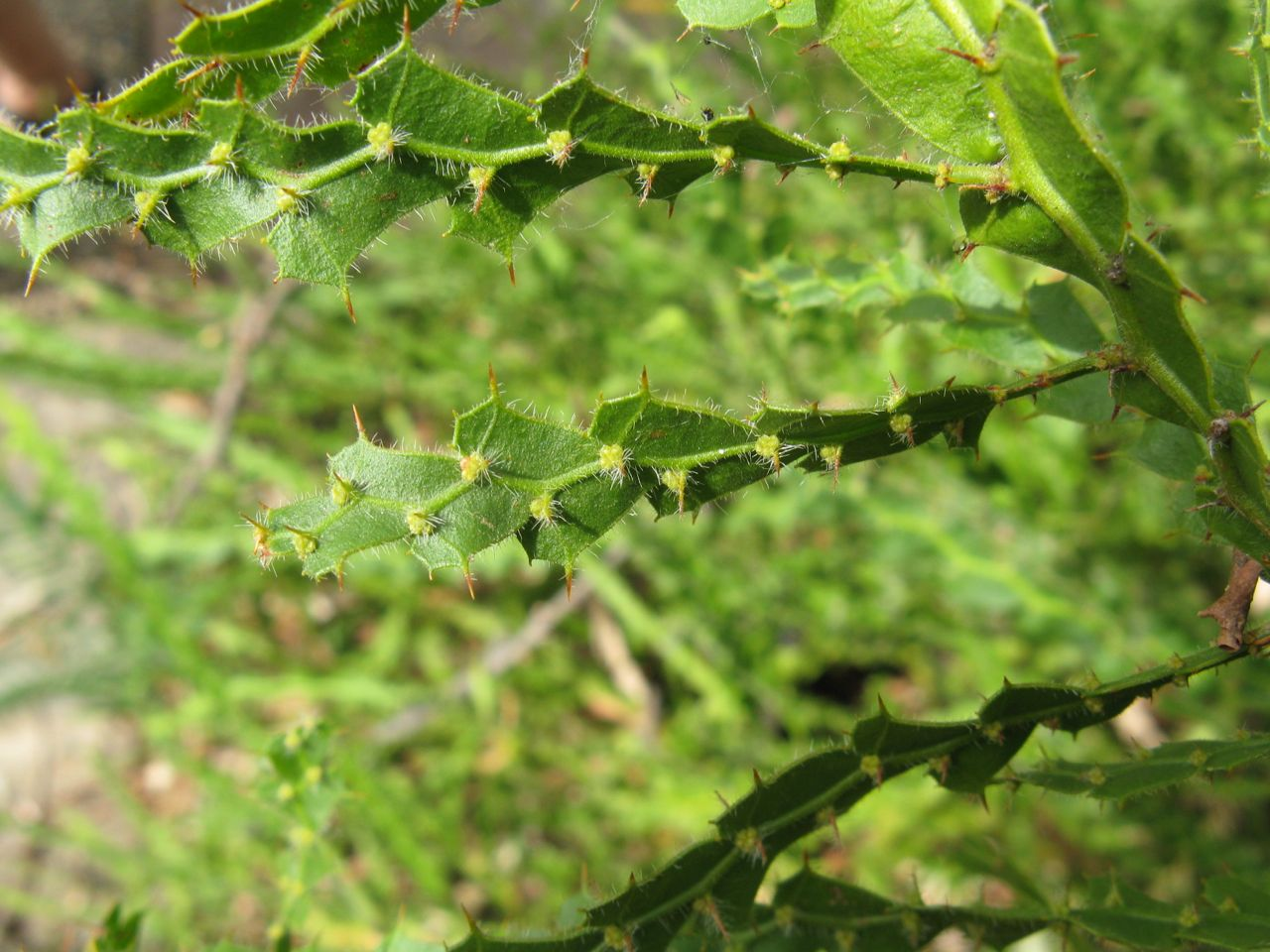
Foliage

Acacia alata, commonly known as winged wattle, is a species of flowering plant in the family Fabaceae and is endemic to the south-west of Western Australia. It is a much-branched shrub, its phyllodes continuous with the branches and arranged on either side of them, flowers arranged in racemes of 2 spherical heads of white to golden-yellow flowers, and flat, curved, crusty pods 20–80 mm (0.79–3.15 in) long.

== Description ==
Acacia alata is a much-branched shrub, typically growing to a height of 0.3–2.1 m (1 ft 0 in – 6 ft 11 in) with zig-zag branches. The phyllodes are continuous with the braches and are arranged on either side of them, 2–20 mm (0.079–0.787 in) wide, but narrowest in the flower-bearing regions. The free ends of the phyllodes are 5–70 mm (0.20–2.76 in) long, sometimes with a spiny tip. There are 1 to 3 prominent glands on a triangular spur. There are 1 or 2 spherical heads of flowers in axils on a peduncle 4–12 mm (0.16–0.47 in) long, the heads with 4 to 15 white to golden-coloured flowers. Flowering time varies with variety, and the fruit is a flat, curved pod, 20–80 mm (0.79–3.15 in) long and 5–11 mm (0.20–0.43 in) wide, crust-like and densely hairy containing oblong to elliptic seeds 2.5–4.5 mm (0.098–0.177 in) long with an aril on the end.

== Taxonomy ==
Acacia alata was first formally described by Robert Brown in William Aiton's Hortus Kewensis. The specific epithet (alata) means "winged".

The names of four varieties of A. alata are accepted by the Australian Plant Census:

- Acacia alata R.Br. var. alata is a shrub 0.5–1.5 m (1 ft 8 in – 4 ft 11 in) high with spiny stipules, the free portion of phyllodes 5–20 mm (0.20–0.79 in) long, and heads containing 6 to 10 flowers from May to December.
- Acacia alata var. biglandulosa Benth. is a shrub 0.5–1.5 m (1 ft 8 in – 4 ft 11 in) high, the free portion of phyllodes 5–20 mm (0.20–0.79 in) long, and heads containing 4 to 7 flowers mainly from June to September.
- Acacia alata var. platyptera (Lindl.) Meisn. is a shrub 0.5–1.0 m (1 ft 8 in – 3 ft 3 in) high with innocuous stipules, the free portion of phyllodes 10–70 mm (0.39–2.76 in) long, and heads containing 12 to 15 flowers from June to August.
- Acacia alata var. tetrantha Maslin is a shrub 0.3–0.6 m (1 ft 0 in – 2 ft 0 in) high, the free portion of phyllodes 10–70 mm (0.39–2.76 in) long, and heads containing 4 flowers from April to July.

== Distribution and habitat ==
Acacia alata grows in a variety of soils near water, rocky hills, breakaways, slat pans and clay flats between Port Gregory and Albany in the Avon Wheatbelt, Geraldton Sandplains, Jarrah Forest, Swan Coastal Plain and Warren bioregions of south-western Western Australia.

Variety alata often grows near creeks in forest and woodland and has a discontinuous distribution, between Perth, Collie, Cape Naturaliste and Manjimup, between Denmark and Albany, with an outlier near Three Springs.

Variety biglandulosa grows in loam and sand, usually in heath, between Port Gregory and Mount Michael about 35 km (22 mi) south-east of Geraldton.

Variety platyptera grows in clay, loam or gravel in gullies, hills and flats near Mogumber, and var. tetrantha usually grows near watercourses in low, open forest and woodland between Eneabba and Cervantes with a disjunct population at Yanchep.

== Conservation status ==
Acacia alata and three of its varieties are list as "not threatened" by the Government of Western Australia Department of Biodiversity, Conservation and Attractions, but var. platyptera is listed as "Priority Four" meaning that it is rare or near threatened.

== Use in horticulture ==
This plant tolerates frosts to −7 °C (19 °F).
