= Johann Christoph Wendland =

German botanist (1755–1828)

Johann Christoph Wendland (July 17, 1755 – July 27, 1828) was a German botanist and gardener born in Petit-Landau, Alsace.

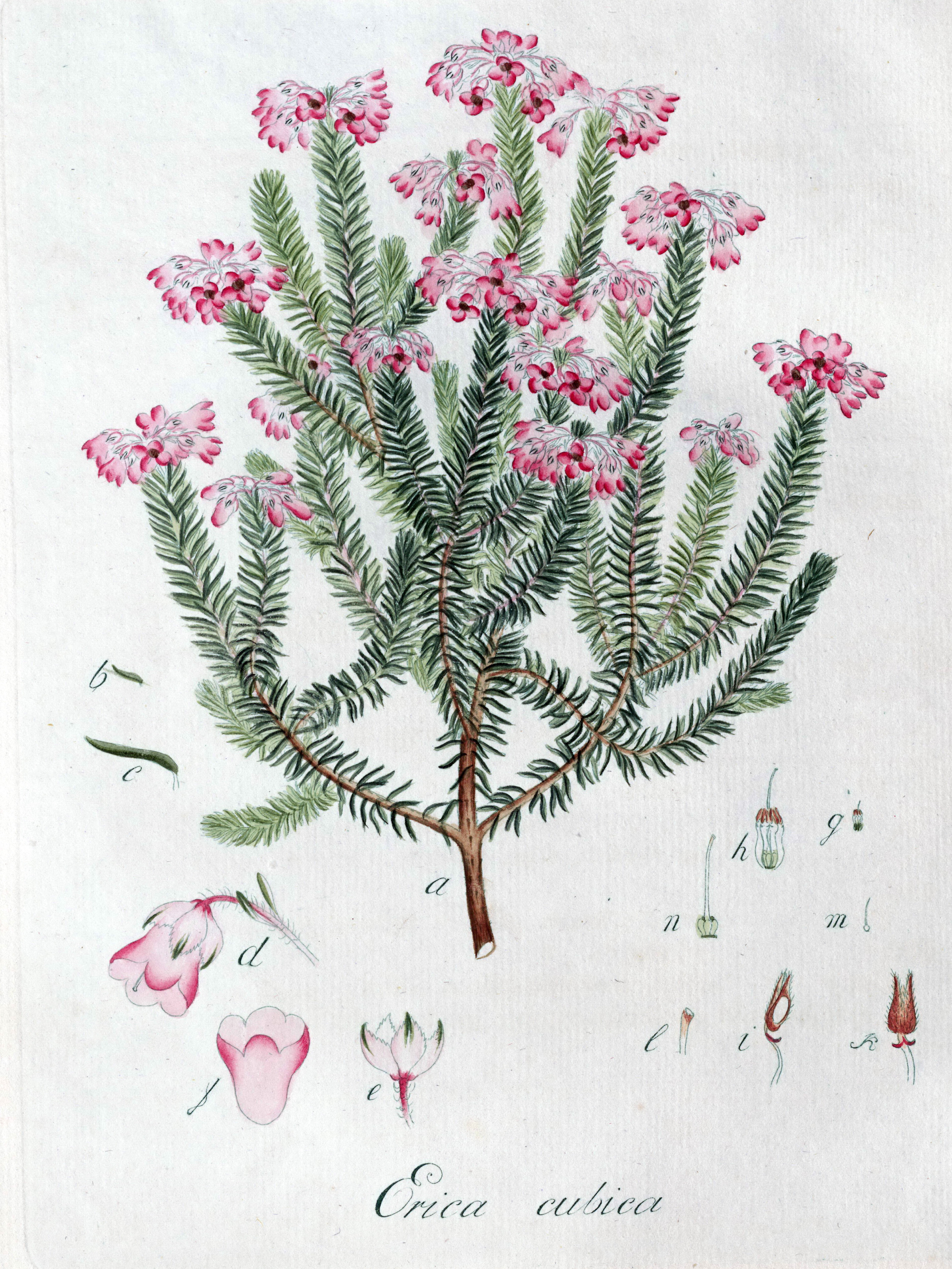
Erica cubica L. from 'Ericarum Icones et descriptiones' (1802)

== Family ==
His son, Heinrich Ludolph Wendland (1791–1869), and his grandson, Hermann Wendland (1825–1903), were also gardeners and botanists.

== Youth ==
As a young man he received an education in horticulture at the nursery of Karlsruhe Palace. In 1780 he became a gardener at Herrenhausen Gardens in Hanover, where he gained botanical experience from Jakob Friedrich Ehrhart (1742–1795), the director of the gardens.

== Life work ==
In 1817 Wendland was appointed inspector at Herrenhausen Gardens. He specialized in the culture of vineyards and peach trees. He created the illustrations for his published works. As a taxonomist, he circumscribed numerous plant genera and species.

== Selected publications ==
- Hortus Herrenhusanus, 1788-1801
- Verzeichnis der Glas- und Treibhauspflanzen des Königlichen Berggartens zu Herrenhausen (List of glass and greenhouse plants of the Herrenhausen Gardens), 1797
- Botanische Beobachtungen nebst einigen neuen Gattungen und Arten (Botanical observations, including some new genera and species), 1798
- Ericarum icones et descriptiones; (26 issues)- 1798-1823
- Collectio plantarum tam exoticarum quam indigenarum; (three volumes until 1819).
