= Timber trees of Gauteng =

Alphabetical list of useful timber trees growing in the Gauteng area of South Africa

This is an alphabetical list of useful timber trees, indigenous (cultivated and natural) and exotic, growing in the Gauteng area of South Africa. These trees range in size up to some 1.5m DBH, such as Cedrus deodara, the Himalayan cedar. Hobbyists will seek out even small pieces of highly valued timber, such as Buxus macowanii, the South African counterpart of Buxus sempervirens, for turnery or the making of boxes and small items. Despite the wealth of useful woods available in Gauteng, most of the trees, felled or fallen, are dumped or cut into short lengths for fuel. Trees grown in urban or suburban environments are rarely pruned and are consequently often knotty. Timber frequently holds nails, wire and spikes, attesting to a variety of abuse during the lifetime of a tree, and requiring the use of a metal detector by the sawmiller. Garden cuttings and dead leaves are occasionally piled next to trees and burnt, leaving charred scars and inclusions.

- Acacia ataxacantha DC.
- Acacia afra (Thunb.) Willd.
- Acacia elata Benth.
- Acacia galpinii Burtt Davy
- Acacia karroo Hayne
- Acacia mearnsii De Wild.
- Acacia melanoxylon R.Br.
- Acacia robusta Burch.
- Acacia sieberiana var. woodii (Burtt Davy) Keay & Brenan
- Acacia xanthophloea Benth.
- Acer negundo L.
- Acer palmatum Thunb.
- Aesculus hippocastanum L.
- Afrocarpus falcatus (Thunb.) C.N.Page
- Ailanthus altissima (Mill.) Swingle
- Albizia odoratissima (L.f.) Benth.
- Araucaria araucana (Molina) K.Koch
- Araucaria bidwillii Hook.
- Araucaria heterophylla (Salisb.) Franco
- Bauhinia variegata L.
- Betula pendula Roth
- Brachychiton acerifolius (A.Cunn. ex G.Don) F.Muell.
- Brachychiton discolor F.Muell.
- Brachychiton populneus (Schott & Endl.) R.Br.
- Brachylaena rotundata S.Moore
- Buddleja saligna Willd.
- Buxus macowanii Oliv.
- Caesalpinia ferrea C.Mart.
- Calodendrum capense (L.f.) Thunb.
- Carya illinoinensis (Wangenh.) K.Koch
- Castanea sativa Mill.
- Castanospermum australe A.Cunn. & C.Fraser
- Casuarina cunninghamiana Miq.
- Casuarina equisetifolia L.
- Cedrus atlantica (Endl.) Manetti ex Carrière
- Cedrus deodara (Roxb. ex D.Don) G.Don
- Cedrus libani A.Rich.
- Celtis africana Burm.f.
- Celtis sinensis Pers.
- Ceratonia siliqua L.
- Cinnamomum camphora (L.) J.Presl
- Citharexylum spinosum L.
- Corymbia maculata (Hook.) K.D.Hill & L.A.S.Johnson
- Cryptomeria japonica (Thunb. ex L.f.) D.Don
- Cupressus arizonica Greene
- Cupressus macrocarpa Hartw.
- Cupressus sempervirens L.
- Diospyros virginiana L.
- Dodonaea viscosa (L.) Jacq.
- Dombeya rotundifolia (Hochst.) Planch.
- Ekebergia capensis Sparrm.
- Eriobotrya japonica (Thunb.) Lindl.
- Eucalyptus camaldulensis Dehnh.
- Eucalyptus cinerea F.Muell. ex Benth.
- Eucalyptus cloeziana F.Muell.
- Eucalyptus diversicolor F.Muell.
- Eucalyptus grandis W.Hill
- Eucalyptus marginata Donn ex Sm.
- Eucalyptus paniculata Sm.
- Eucalyptus sideroxylon A.Cunn. ex Woolls
- Faidherbia albida (Delile) A.Chev. (Acacia albida Delile)
- Fraxinus americana L.
- Gleditsia triacanthos L.
- Grevillea robusta A.Cunn. ex R.Br.
- Hakea salicifolia (Vent.) B.L.Burtt
- Jacaranda mimosifolia D.Don
- Juglans regia L.
- Lagerstroemia indica L.
- Laurus nobilis L.
- Ligustrum vulgare L.
- Liquidambar styraciflua L.
- Liriodendron tulipifera L.
- Magnolia grandiflora L.
- Melaleuca argentea W.Fitzg.
- Melaleuca quinquenervia (Cav.) S.T.Blake
- Melia azedarach L.
- Morus nigra L.
- Nuxia congesta R.Br. ex Fresen.
- Olea europaea subsp. cuspidata (Wall. & G.Don) Cif.
- Olinia emarginata Burtt Davy
- Pappea capensis Eckl. & Zeyh.
- Peltophorum africanum Sond.
- Persea americana Mill.
- Phyllostachys bambusoides Siebold & Zucc.
- Pinus canariensis C.Sm.
- Pinus halepensis Mill.
- Pinus patula Schiede ex Schltdl. & Cham.
- Pinus radiata D.Don
- Pinus roxburghii Sarg.
- Pittosporum viridiflorum Sims
- Platanus spp.
- Podocarpus latifolius (Thunb.) R.Br. ex Mirb.
- Podocarpus henkelii Stapf ex Dallim. & B.D.Jacks.
- Populus × canescens (Aiton) Sm.
- Populus deltoides Marshall
- Prunus armeniaca L.
- Prunus laurocerasus L.
- Prunus persica (L.) Batsch
- Psidium guajava L.
- Pyrus communis L.
- Quercus ilex L.
- Quercus palustris Münchh.
- Quercus robur L.
- Quercus rugosa Née
- Quercus suber L.
- Robinia pseudacacia L.
- Salix babylonica L.
- Schinus molle L.
- Searsia lancea (L.f.) F.A.Barkley
- Searsia leptodictya (Diels) T.S.Yi, A.J.Mill. & J.Wen
- Sequoia sempervirens (D.Don) Endl.
- Styphnolobium japonicum (L.) Schott
- Syncarpia glomulifera (Sm.) Nied.
- Syzygium paniculatum Gaertn.
- Taxodium distichum (L.) Rich.
- Tarchonanthus camphoratus L.
- Tecoma stans (L.) Juss. ex Kunth
- Tipuana tipu (Benth.) Kuntze
- Toona ciliata M.Roem. (Cedrela toona Roxb. ex Rottler)
- Trichilia emetica Vahl
- Ulmus parvifolia Jacq.
- Ulmus minor Mill.
- Vepris lanceolata (Lam.) G. Don
- Virgilia divaricata Adamson
- Zanthoxylum capense (Thunb.) Harv.
- Ziziphus mucronata Willd.

== Gallery ==
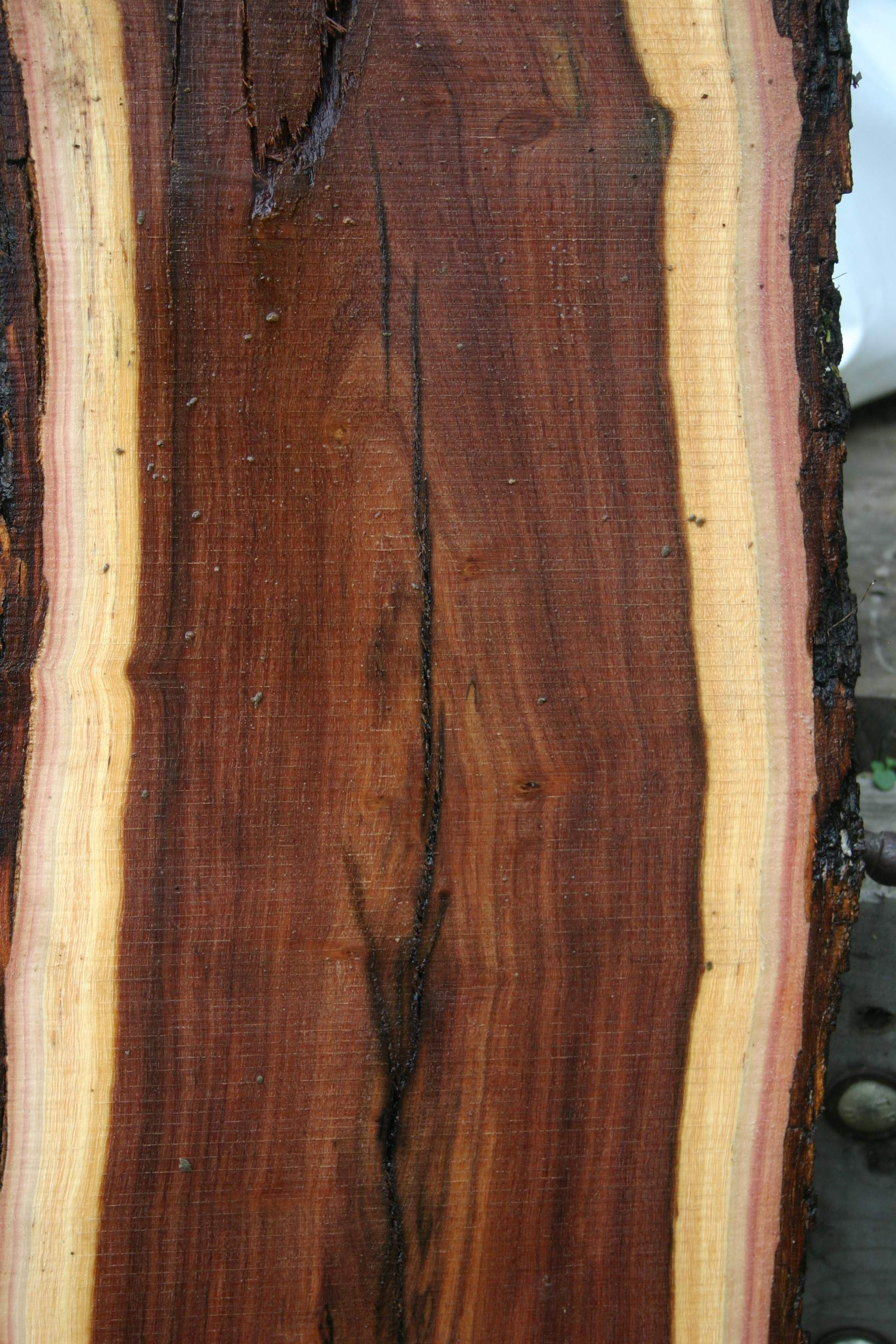
Acacia afra

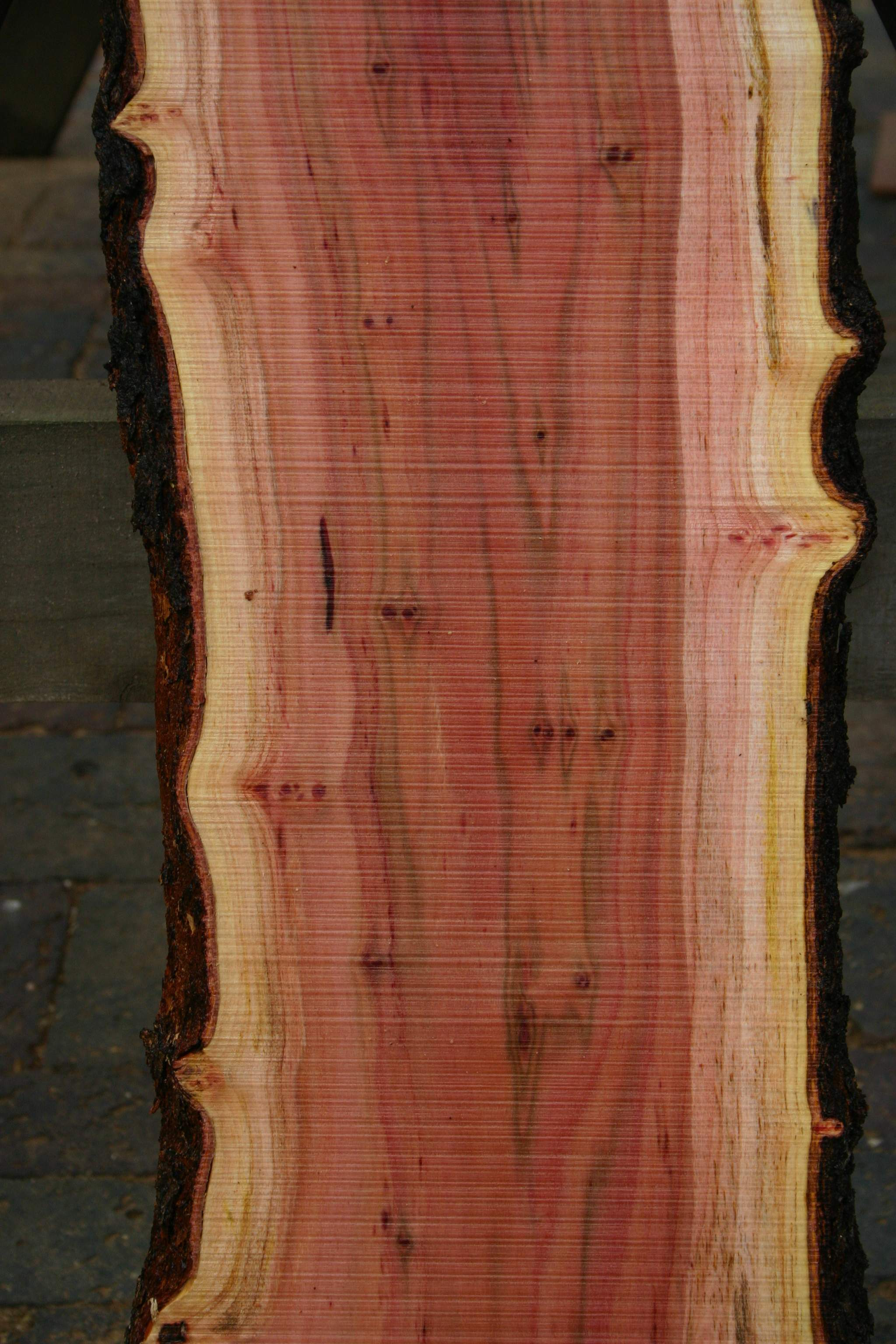
Searsia lancea

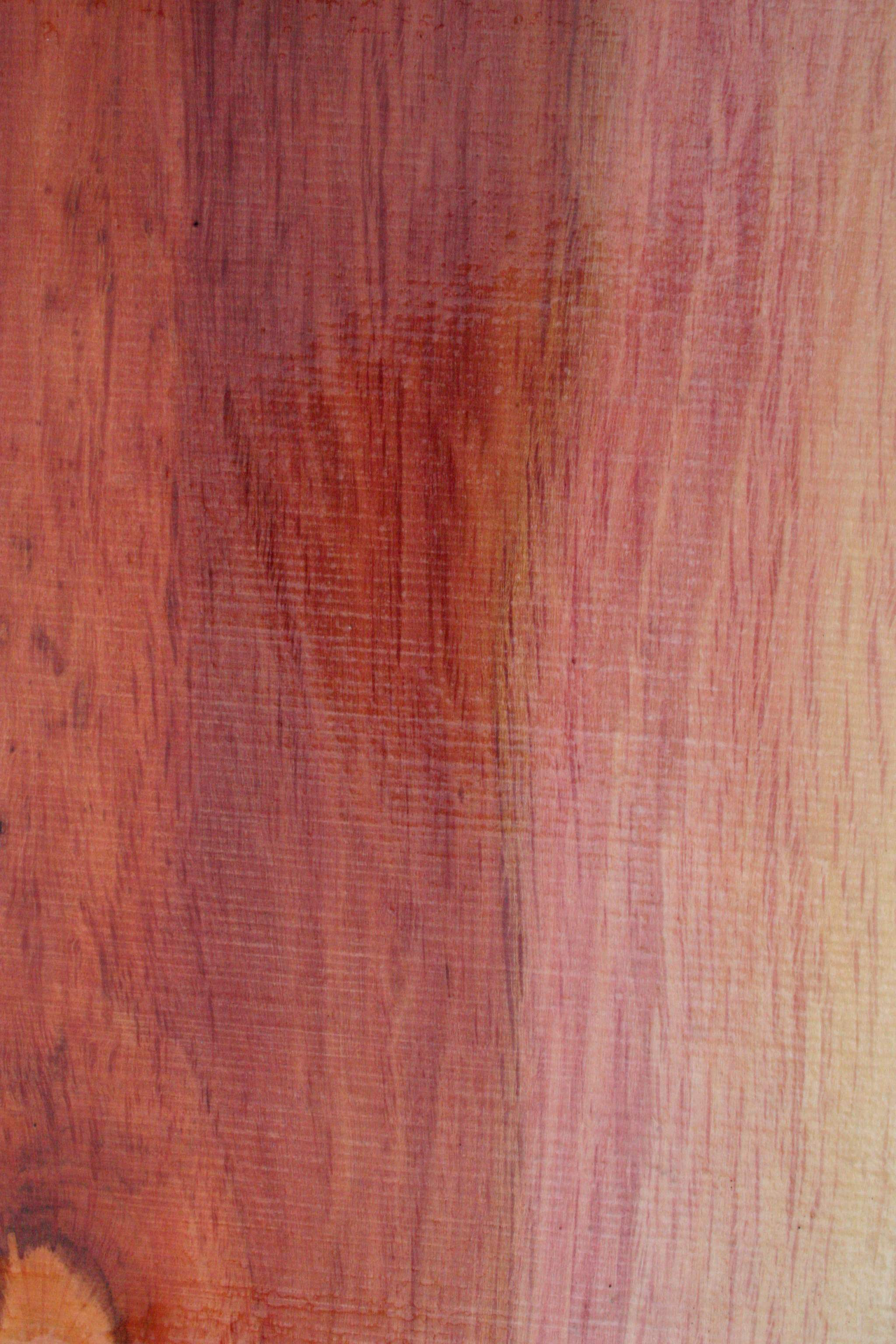
Casuarina equisetifolia

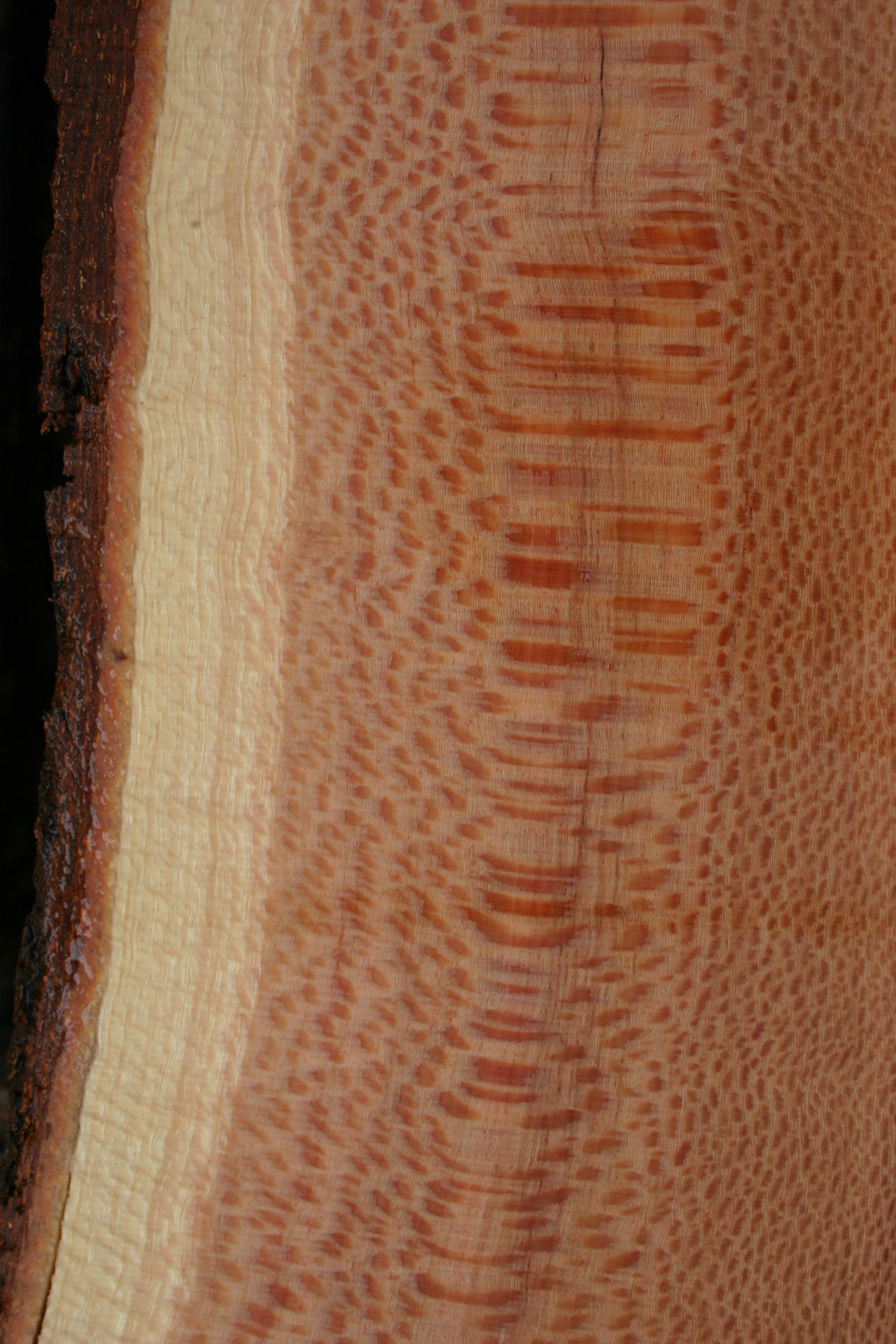
Grevillea robusta

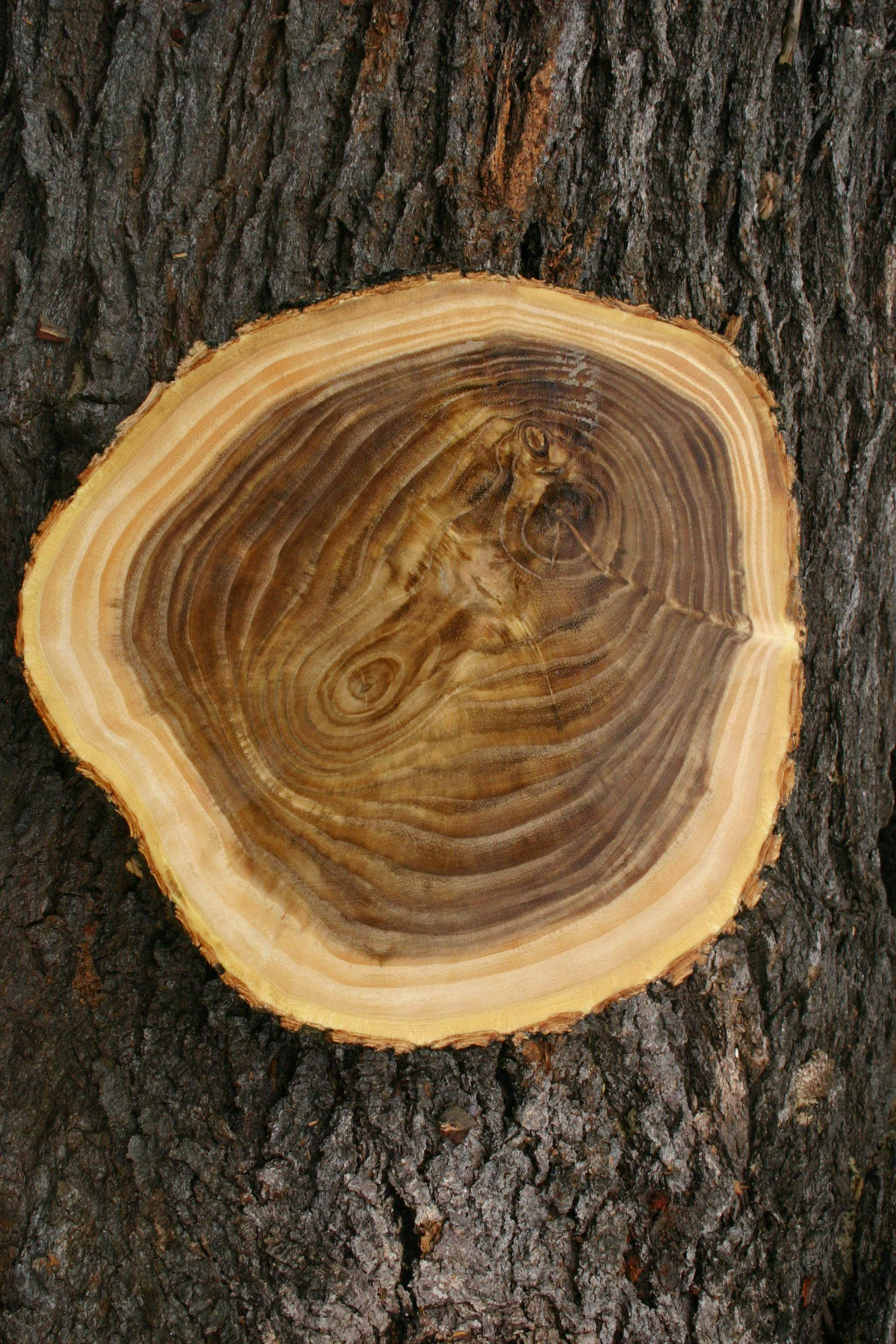
Styphnolobium japonicum

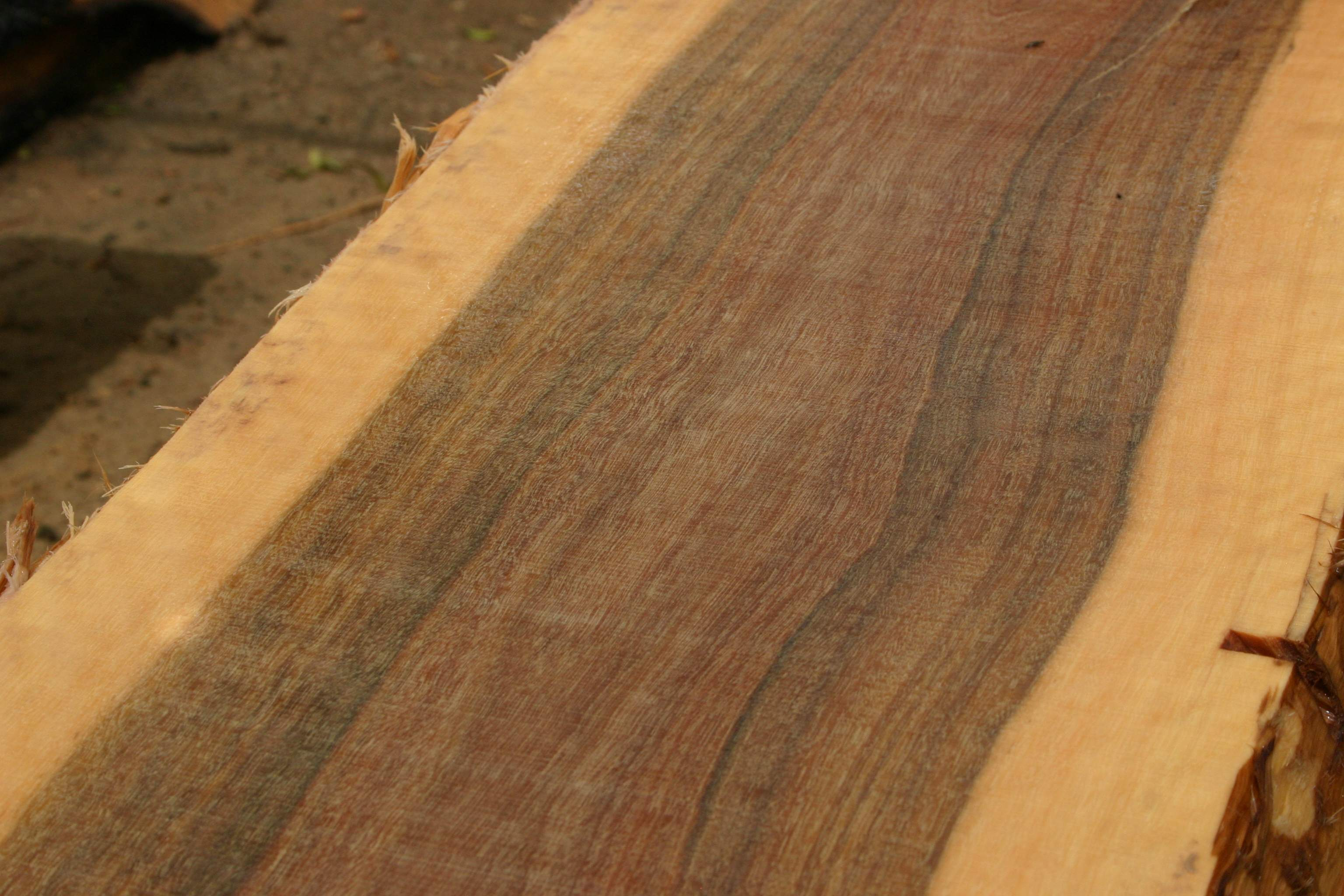
Eucalyptus paniculata
