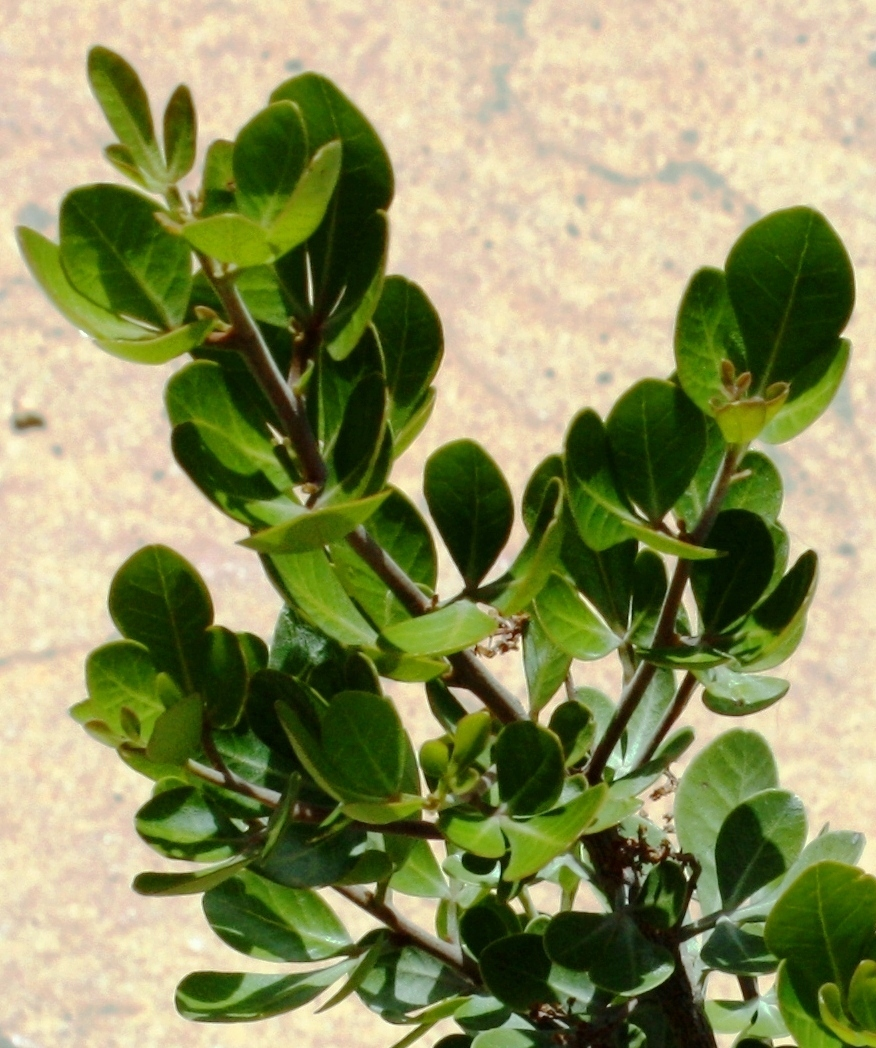

Scientific classification
- Kingdom: Plantae
- Clade: Tracheophytes
- Clade: Angiosperms
- Clade: Eudicots
- Clade: Rosids
- Order: Sapindales
- Family: Anacardiaceae
- Genus: Searsia
- Species: S. lucida

Binomial name
- Searsia lucida (L.) F.A.Barkley (1962-1963 publ. 1965)

Synonyms
- Rhus lucida L. (1753); Toxicodendron lucidum (L.) Kuntze (1891)

= Searsia lucida =

Species of tree

Searsia lucida, previously known as Rhus lucida, and commonly known as the varnished kuni-rhus (English) or blinktaaibos (Afrikaans).

== Description ==
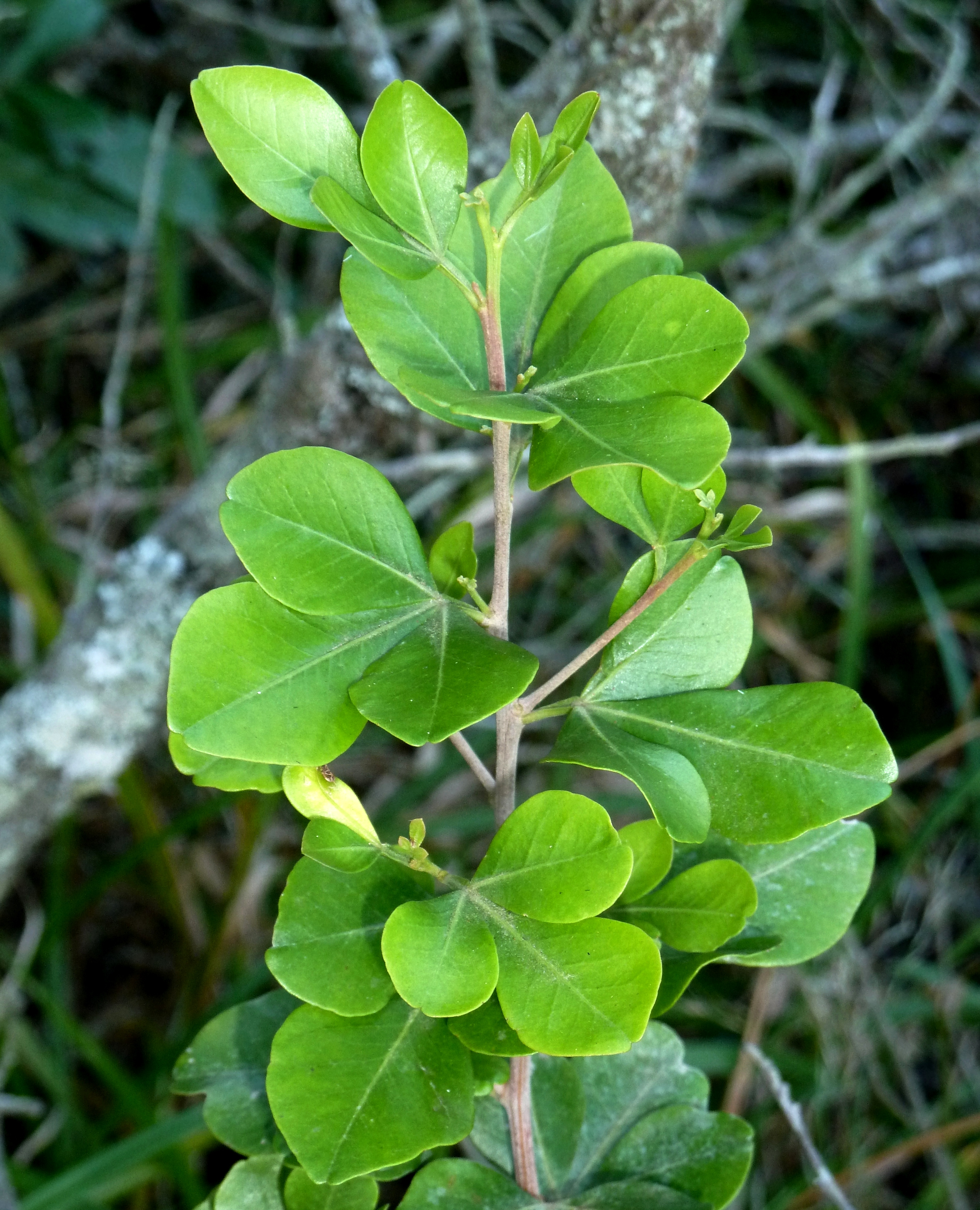
Leaf detail of Searsia lucida.

The tree seldom reaches a height of more than 2 metres and can spread as a shrub over several meters too.

The stems and branches are upright and erect. Young stems are red, shiny, resinous and sticky.

The leaves are shiny ("lucida" = "shiny"), trifoliate, leathery (sub-coriaceous), and a dark to olive green colour (often becoming orange before being shed).

The leaflets' shape is obovate-cuneate, often with small notches in their rounded tips. The leaflets are the same colour above and below, with a prominent central keel and fine lateral veins visible. Damaged leaf-surfaces become pale, almost white.

The leaf's petiole (stalk) is slightly winged, at least along its upper half.

It produces creamy-white flowers from June to October, in small, sparse, terminal inflorescences. The flowers are small, with petals less than 2 mm long.

It bears spherical fruits 4–5 mm in diameter, which are initially green and turn shiny brown as they mature (Oct-Nov). The fruits are eaten by birds.

=== Related species ===
This species closely resembles Searsia pallens and Searsia undulata, which co-occur over much of its distribution range.

The leaf of Searsia pallens also has a 10mm petiole that is slightly winged, but it has leaflets that are much longer (40mm) than they are wide (10mm). Its leaflets have 4 to 6 lateral veins per centimeter. Searsia pallens also has glossy fruits that are 4-5mm wide, but its fruits are elliptical-ovoid.
Searsia lucida in contrast, has a rounded fruit, and fewer lateral veins on its leaves (only 2 or 3 per centimeter). The leaflets of Searsia lucida are also broader and more oval in shape.

== Distribution and habitat ==
This small tree has a distribution along the West Coast of South Africa from Saldanha Bay around the Cape and up the East Coast almost until the Mozambique border. Its distribution area also encompasses Lesotho and the whole of Kwazulu-Natal and stretches in an arm past Eswatini, right up the Lowveld areas of Mpumalanga and into Limpopo Province and Zimbabwe.

It is found in scrub or forest areas from sea level to 2000 metres elevation.
