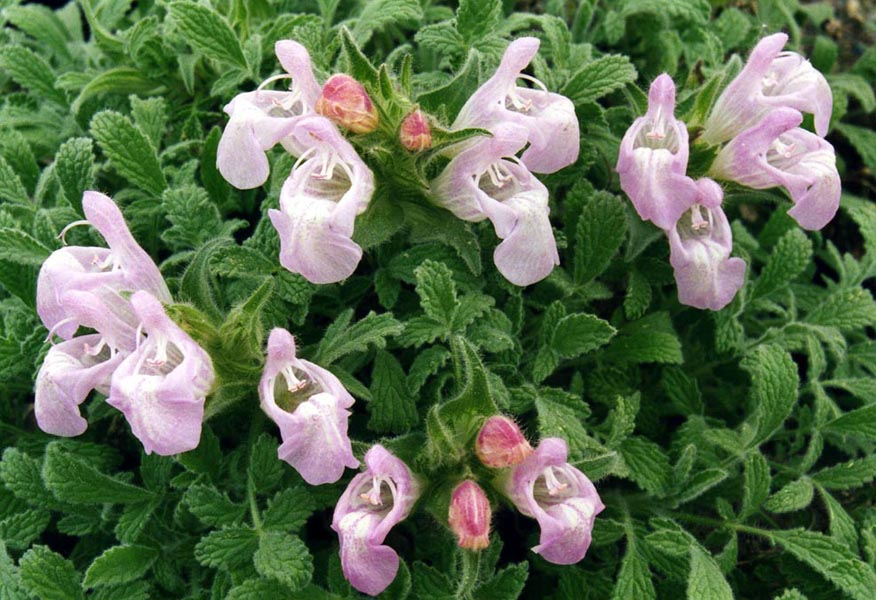

Scientific classification
- Kingdom: Plantae
- Clade: Tracheophytes
- Clade: Angiosperms
- Clade: Eudicots
- Clade: Asterids
- Order: Lamiales
- Family: Lamiaceae
- Genus: Salvia
- Species: S. caespitosa

Binomial name
- Salvia caespitosa Montbret & Aucher ex Benth.

= Salvia caespitosa =

Species of flowering plant

Salvia caespitosa is a herbaceous perennial native to rocky limestone and volcanic slopes, at 4600–7900 ft elevation, in central and southern Anatolia. It has been grown in horticulture since the 1950s, typically in rock gardens, due to its dwarf, mat-growing habit. Caespitosa refers to its habit of "growing in dense clumps or tufts", with divided leaves and stems that grow in bunches, rather than being evenly spaced. The pale pinkish lilac flowers, about 1.6 in long, grow on very short inflorescences that are barely longer than the leaf.
