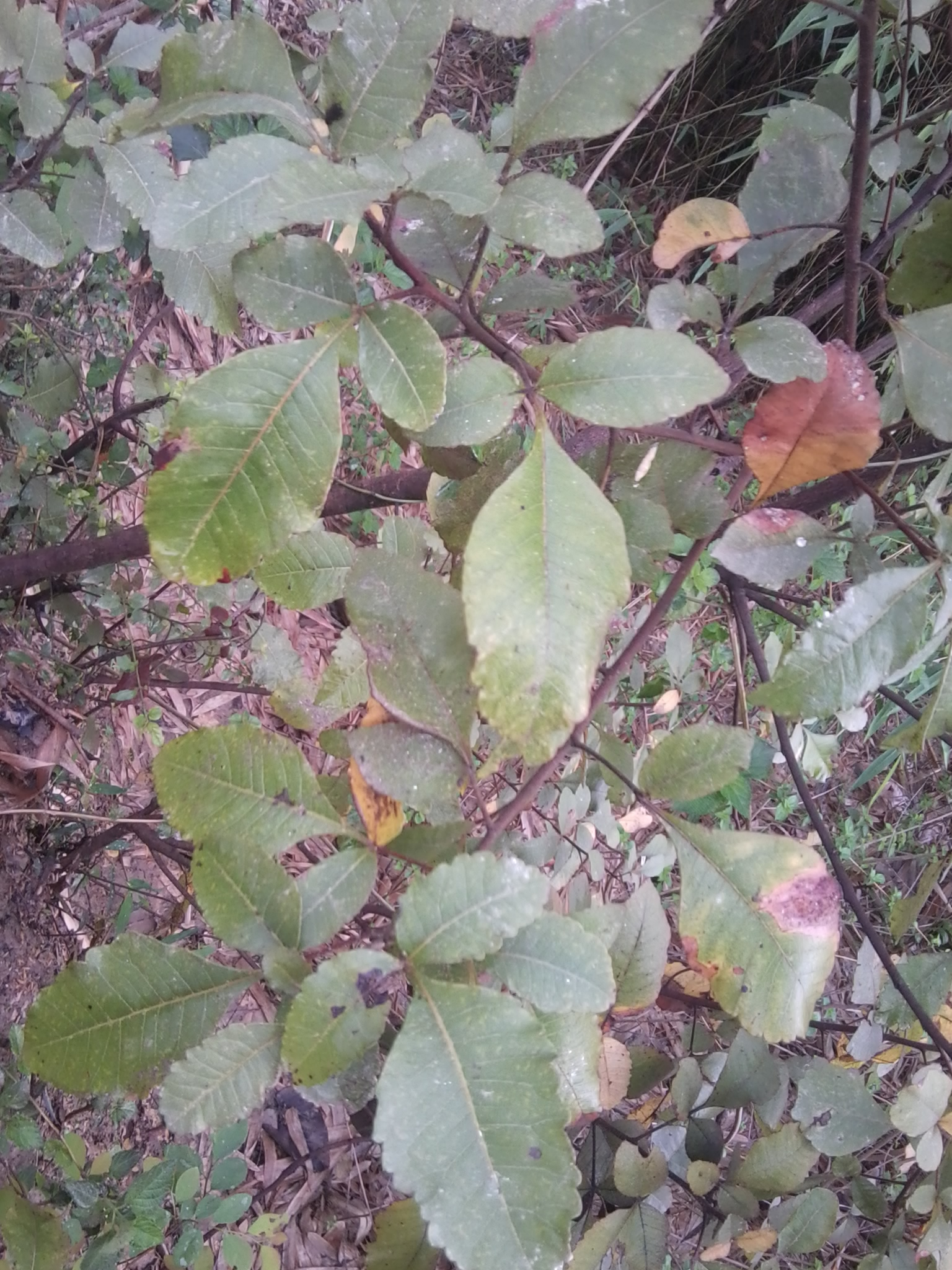

Conservation status
- Least Concern (IUCN 3.1)

Scientific classification
- Kingdom: Plantae
- Clade: Tracheophytes
- Clade: Angiosperms
- Clade: Eudicots
- Clade: Rosids
- Order: Sapindales
- Family: Anacardiaceae
- Genus: Searsia
- Species: S. parviflora

Binomial name
- Searsia parviflora (Roxb.) F.A.Barkley

Synonyms
- Rhus parviflora Roxb.; Toxicodendron parviflorum (Roxb.) Kuntze

= Searsia parviflora =

Species of shrub

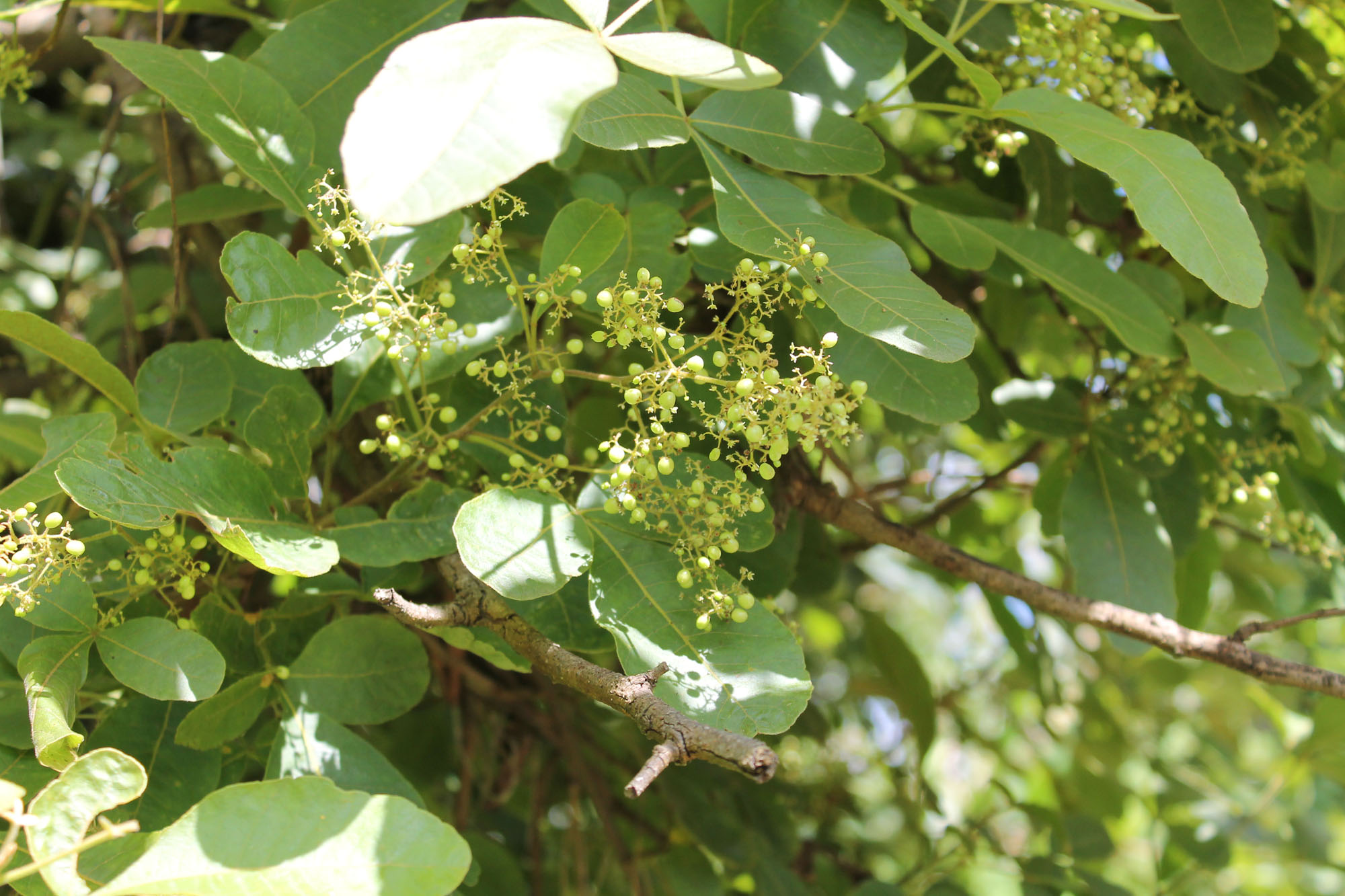
Searsia parviflora fruit

Searsia parviflora, commonly known as small-flowered poison sumac, is a species of flowering plant native to the northern Indian subcontinent and Myanmar. It is a much-branched shrub or small tree bearing stalked leaves with three leaflets; the end leaflet is larger than the other two. The leaflets are obovate, with rounded tips, tapering bases and irregularly toothed margins. The flowers are tiny, yellowish and fragrant. The fruit is small, round and red when ripe. S. parviflora is found in the Himalayas, from Kumaun to Bhutan, at elevations of 700–1,100 metres (2,300–3,600 ft).
