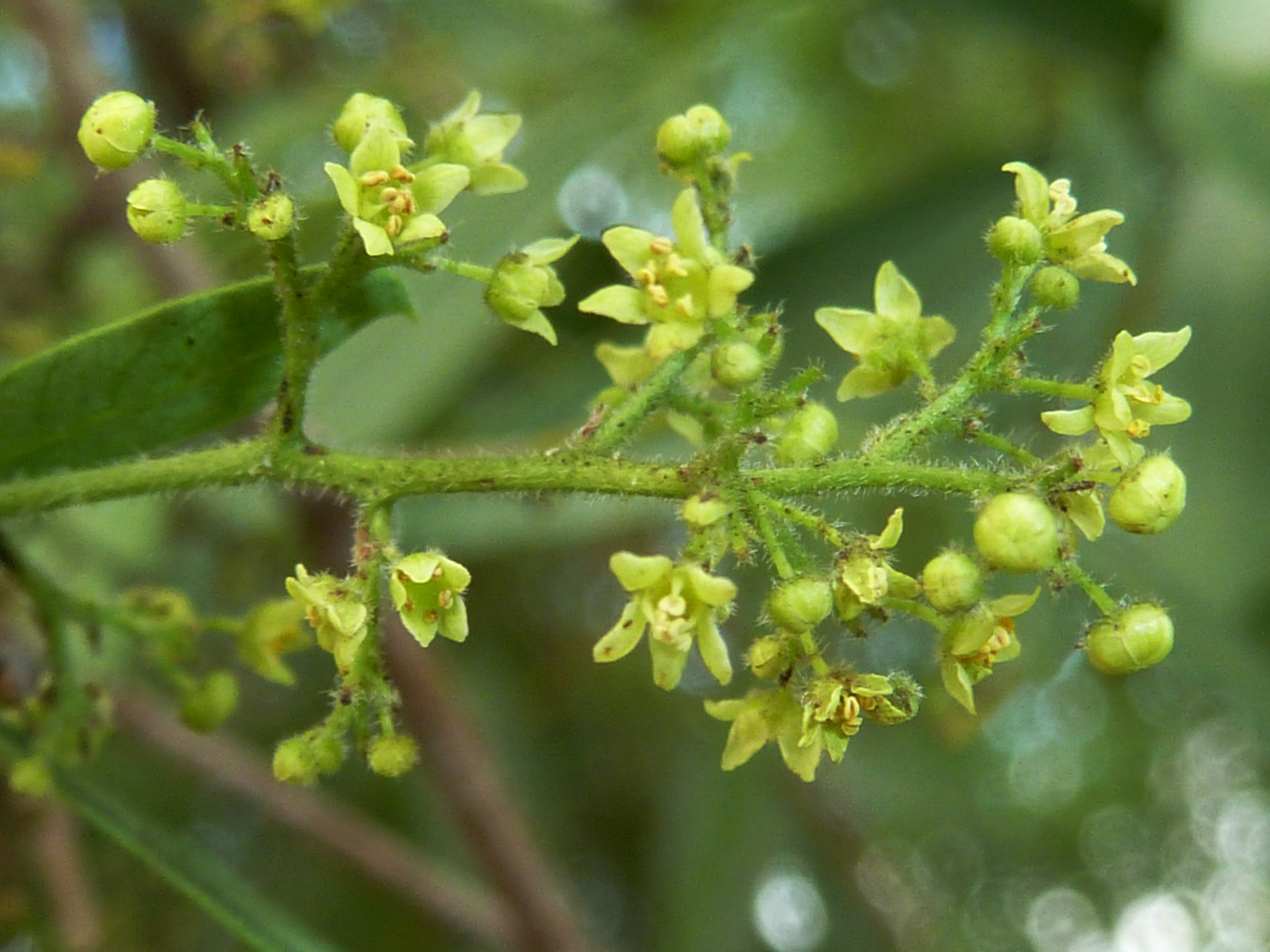
- Searsia leptodictya

Scientific classification
- Kingdom: Plantae
- Clade: Tracheophytes
- Clade: Angiosperms
- Clade: Eudicots
- Clade: Rosids
- Order: Sapindales
- Family: Anacardiaceae
- Subfamily: Anacardioideae
- Genus: Searsia; F.A.Barkley

Species
- See text

Synonyms
- Terminthia Bernh. ex Pfeiff. (1874)

= Searsia (plant) =

Genus of trees

Searsia is a genus of flowering plants in the family Anacardiaceae. It includes over 100 species native to Africa, the eastern Mediterranean, Arabian Peninsula, Indian subcontinent, Myanmar, and south-central China.

== Taxonomy ==
=== Species ===
As of November 2024, Plants of the World Online has 110 accepted species:

- Searsia acocksii (Moffett) Moffett
- Searsia acuminatissima (R.Fern. & A.Fern.) Moffett
- Searsia albida (Schousb.) Moffett
- Searsia albomarginata (Sond.) Moffett
- Searsia anchietae (Ficalho & Hiern) Moffett
- Searsia angolensis (Engl.) Moffett
- Searsia angustifolia (L.) F.A.Barkley
- Searsia arenaria (Engl.) Moffett
- Searsia aucheri (Boiss.) Moffett
- Searsia batophylla (Codd) Moffett
- Searsia blanda (Meikle) Moffett
- Searsia bolusii (Sond. ex Engl.) Moffett
- Searsia brenanii (Kokwaro) Moffett
- Searsia burchellii (Sond. ex Engl.) Moffett
- Searsia carnosula (Schönland) Moffett
- Searsia chirindensis (Baker f.) Moffett
- Searsia ciliata (Licht. ex Schult.) A.J.Mill.
- Searsia crenata (Thunb.) Moffett
- Searsia crenulata (A.Rich.) Moffett
- Searsia cuneifolia (L.f.) F.A.Barkley
- Searsia dentata (Thunb.) F.A.Barkley
- Searsia discolor (E.Mey. ex Sond.) Moffett
- Searsia dissecta (Thunb.) Moffett
- Searsia divaricata (Eckl. & Zeyh.) Moffett
- Searsia dracomontana (Moffett) Moffett
- Searsia dregeana (Sond.) Moffett
- Searsia dumetorum (Exell) Moffett
- Searsia engleri (Britten) Moffett
- Searsia erosa (Thunb.) Moffett
- Searsia fanshawei (R.Fern. & A.Fern.) Moffett
- Searsia fastigiata (Eckl. & Zeyh.) Moffett
- Searsia flexicaulis (Baker) Moffett
- Searsia gallagheri (Ghaz.) Moffett
- Searsia gerrardii (Engl.) Moffett
- Searsia glauca (Thunb.) Moffett
- Searsia glutinosa (Hochst. ex A.Rich.) Moffett
- Searsia gracilipes (Exell) Moffett
- Searsia gracillima (Engl.) Moffett
- Searsia grandidens (Harv. ex Engl.) Moffett
- Searsia grossireticulata (Van der Veken) Moffett
- Searsia gueinzii (Sond.) F.A.Barkley
- Searsia harveyi (Moffett) Moffett
- Searsia horrida (Eckl. & Zeyh.) Moffett
- Searsia humpatensis (Meikle) Moffett
- Searsia incisa (L.f.) F.A.Barkley
- Searsia keetii (Schönland) Moffett
- Searsia kirkii (Oliv.) Moffett
- Searsia krebsiana (C.Presl ex Engl.) Moffett
- Searsia kwangoensis (Van der Veken) Moffett
- Searsia kwazuluana (Moffett) Moffett
- Searsia laevigata (L.) F.A.Barkley
- Searsia lancea (L.f.) F.A.Barkley
- Searsia leptodictya (Diels) T.S.Yi, A.J.Mill. & J.Wen
- Searsia longipes (Engl.) Moffett
- Searsia longispina (Eckl. & Zeyh.) Moffett
- Searsia lucens (Hutch.) Moffett
- Searsia lucida (L.) F.A.Barkley
- Searsia magalismontana (Sond.) Moffett
- Searsia maricoana (Moffett) Moffett
- Searsia marlothii (Engl.) Moffett
- Searsia montana (Diels) Moffett
- Searsia monticola (Meikle) Moffett
- Searsia mysorensis (G.Don) Moffett
- Searsia natalensis (Bernh. ex C.Krauss) F.A.Barkley
- Searsia nebulosa (Schönland) Moffett
- Searsia nitida (Engl.) Moffett
- Searsia obtusata (Engl.) Moffett
- Searsia ochracea (Meikle) Moffett
- Searsia pallens (Eckl. & Zeyh.) Moffett
- Searsia paniculata (Wall. ex G.Don) Moffett
- Searsia parviflora (Roxb.) F.A.Barkley
- Searsia pendulina (Jacq.) Moffett
- Searsia pentaphylla (Jacq.) F.A.Barkley
- Searsia pentheri (Zahlbr.) Moffett
- Searsia pondoensis (Schönland) Moffett
- Searsia populifolia (E.Mey. ex Sond.) Moffett
- Searsia problematodes (Merxm. & Roessler) Moffett
- Searsia pterota (C.Presl) Moffett
- Searsia puccionii (Chiov.) Moffett
- Searsia pygmaea (Moffett) Moffett
- Searsia pyroides (Burch.) Moffett
- Searsia quartiniana (A.Rich.) A.J.Mill.
- Searsia refracta (Eckl. & Zeyh.) Moffett
- Searsia rehmanniana (Engl.) Moffett
- Searsia retinorrhoea (Steud. ex Oliv.) Moffett
- Searsia rigida (Mill.) F.A.Barkley
- Searsia rimosa (Eckl. & Zeyh.) Moffett
- Searsia rogersii (Schönland) Moffett
- Searsia rosmarinifolia (Vahl) F.A.Barkley
- Searsia rudatisii (Engl.) Moffett
- Searsia ruspolii (Engl.) Moffett
- Searsia scytophylla (Eckl. & Zeyh.) Moffett
- Searsia sekhukhuniensis (Moffett) Moffett
- Searsia somalensis (Engl.) Moffett
- Searsia squalida (Meikle) Moffett
- Searsia stenophylla (Eckl. & Zeyh.) Moffett
- Searsia tenuinervis (Engl.) Moffett
- Searsia tenuipes (R.Fern. & A.Fern.) Moffett
- Searsia thyrsiflora (Balf.f.) Moffett
- Searsia tomentosa (L.) F.A. Barkley
- Searsia transvaalensis (Engl.) Moffett
- Searsia tridactyla (Burch.) Moffett
- Searsia tripartita (Ucria) Moffett
- Searsia tumulicola (S.Moore) Moffett
- Searsia undulata (Jacq.) T.S.Yi, A.J.Mill. & J.Wen
- Searsia volkii (Suess.) Moffett
- Searsia wellmanii (Engl.) Moffett
- Searsia wildii (R.Fern. & A.Fern.) Moffett
- Searsia wilmsii (Diels) Moffett
- Searsia zeyheri (Sond.) Moffett
