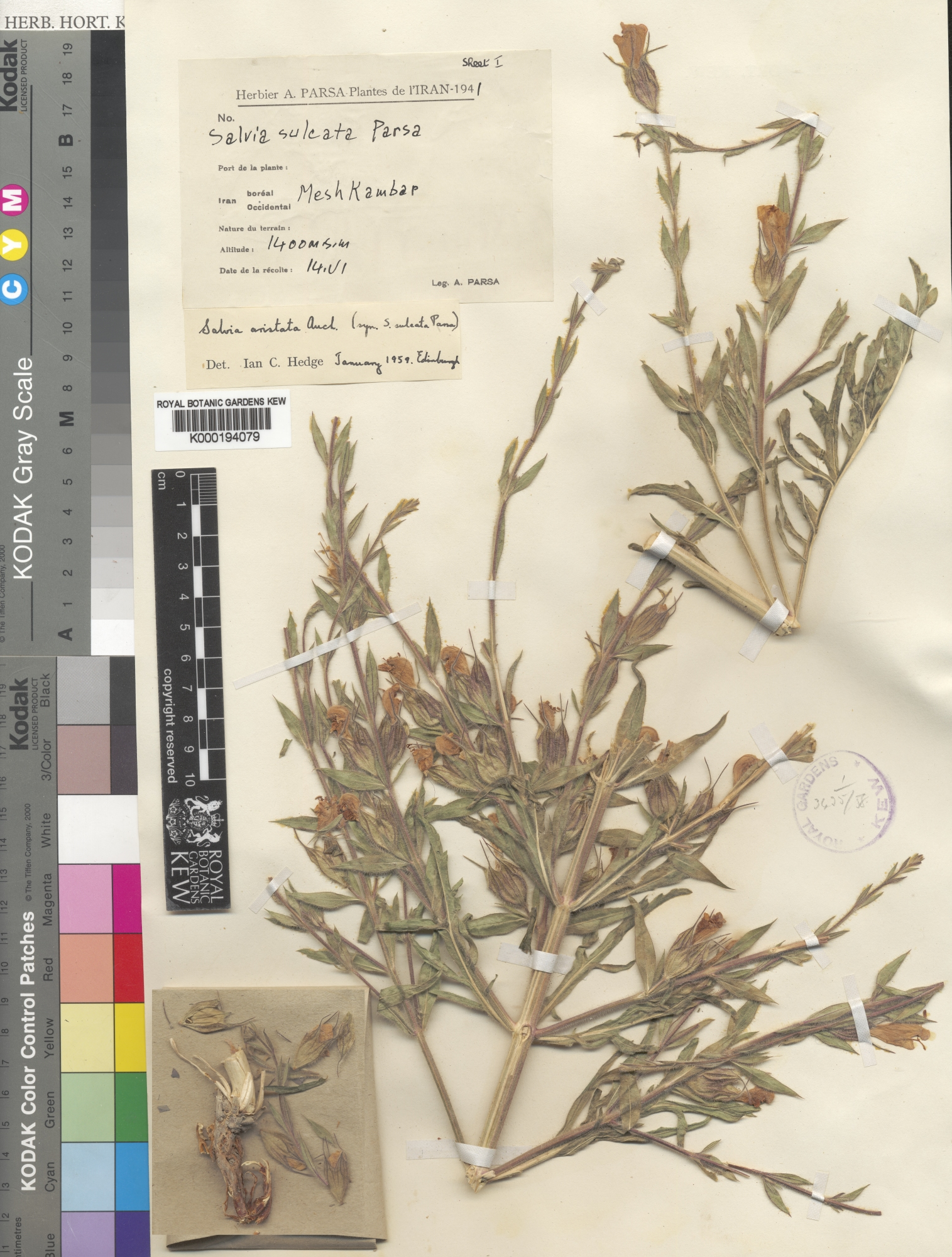

Scientific classification
- Kingdom: Plantae
- Clade: Tracheophytes
- Clade: Angiosperms
- Clade: Eudicots
- Clade: Asterids
- Order: Lamiales
- Family: Lamiaceae
- Genus: Salvia
- Species: S. aristata

Binomial name
- Salvia aristata Aucher ex Benth.

= Salvia aristata =

Species of flowering plant

Salvia aristata is a perennial, root stout, woody plant found in Iran and Turkey.
