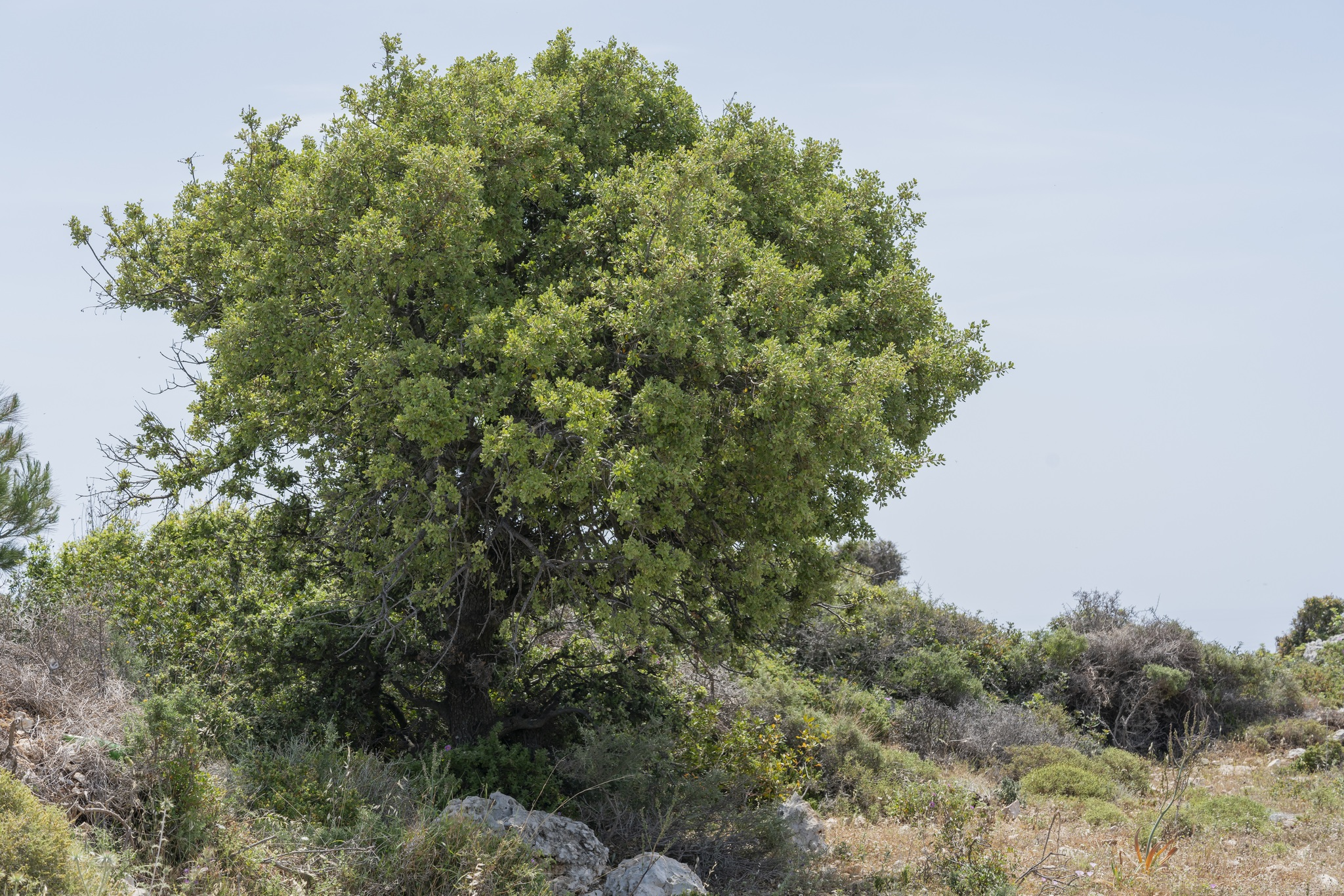

Conservation status
- Least Concern (IUCN 3.1)

Scientific classification
- Kingdom: Plantae
- Clade: Tracheophytes
- Clade: Angiosperms
- Clade: Eudicots
- Clade: Rosids
- Order: Fagales
- Family: Fagaceae
- Genus: Quercus
- Subgenus: Quercus subg. Cerris
- Section: Quercus sect. Ilex
- Species: Q. aucheri

Binomial name
- Quercus aucheri Jaub. & Spach, 1843

= Quercus aucheri =

Species of plant

Quercus aucheri, known as Aucher's oak or the Boz-Pirnal oak is a species of oak tree in the family Fagaceae. It is found in limited portions of the Aegean islands of Greece and parts of Anatolian Turkey. It is placed in section Ilex.

== Description and taxonomy ==
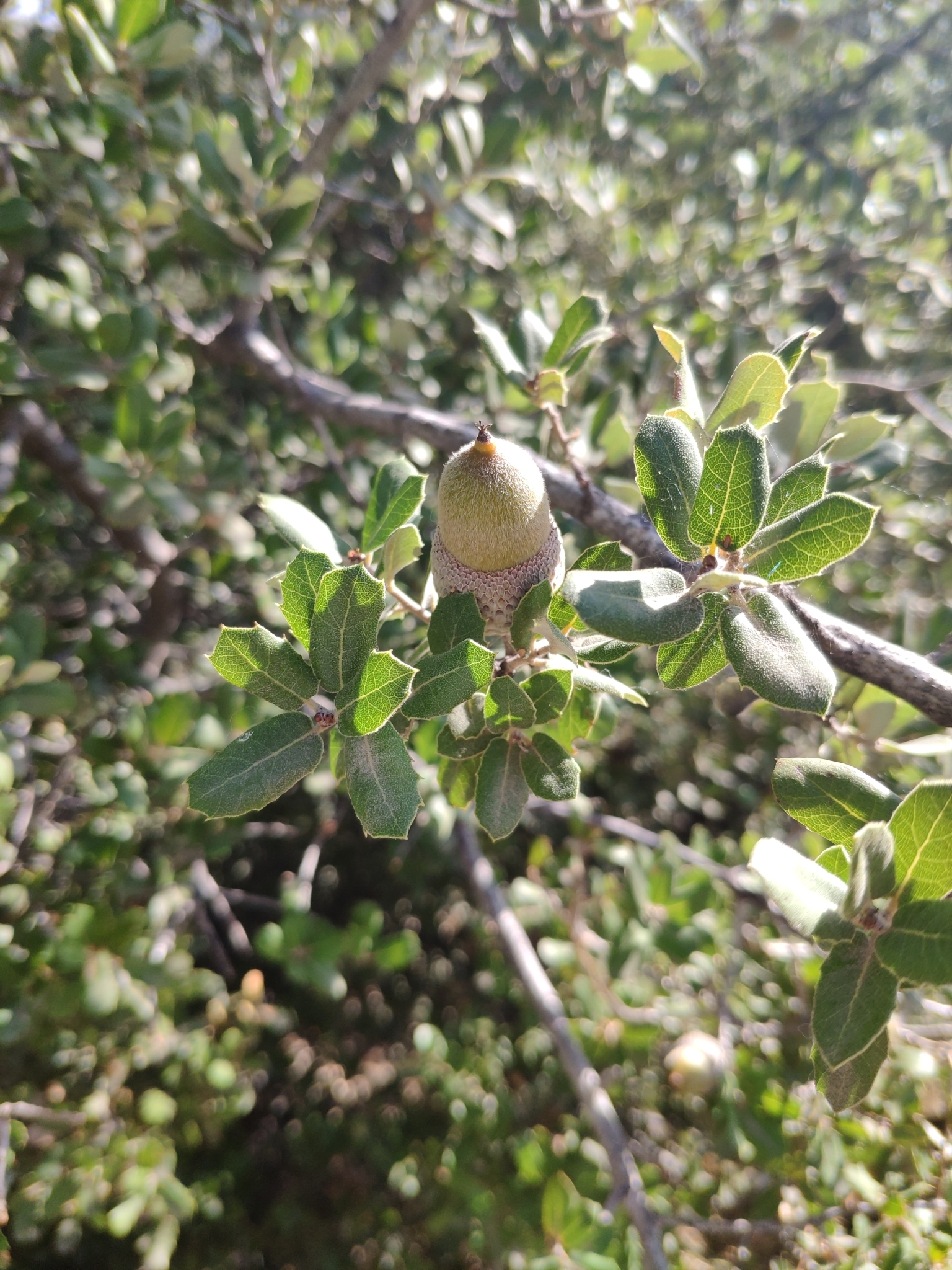
Branch with acorn

Q. aucheri grows as a small evergreen tree or shrub, attaining heights of up to 10 meters. It is close to the kermes oak (Q. coccifera), and not always distinguished from it, however, it also bears a close resemblance to other species in the Mediterranean holly oak group. In contrast to kermes oak, it has sweet instead of bitter acorns that germinate from the base instead of from the tip. Additionally, the petioles are short in Q. aucheri, and acorns are hairy, sometimes appearing white as a result. The leaves are also hairy on the underside where the kermes oak's leaves are not. Leaf morphology is highly variable, and leaves with both entire and serrated margins may be found on the same tree.

The species was first described by Hippolyte Jaubert and Édouard Spach in 1843, and its species epithet commemorates Pierre Aucher-Éloy. Quercus aucheri no doubt belongs in section Ilex, however, it is unclear whether it is closer to holm oak (Q. ilex), as suggested by a molecular analysis, or kermes oak, as suggested by a comprehensive phylogenetic analysis by Hipp et al., as well as morphological comparisons. Others yet have argued for a closer relationship to ballota oak (Q. rotundifolia) from the western Mediterranean, on account of similarities in leaf and acorn morphology.

== Distribution and ecology ==
The distribution of Quercus aucheri is restricted to the islands of Rhodes, Kos and surrounding islands in the south-eastern Aegean, as well as the south-western coast of Anatolia. Here it occurs mainly in the Muğla, Antalya and Aydın provinces. Despite its limited range, Q. aucheri is a common member of coastal woodlands in the southeastern Aegean and the Teke Peninsula, occurring on volcanic and calcareous slopes. Its distribution is more coastal and somewhat further downslope than that of kermes oak, however, the two overlap in range. Another species of oak Q. aucheri co-occurs with is Aleppo oak (Q. infectoria); Other common constituents of these woodland communities are Turkish pine (Pinus brutia), Mediterranean cypress (Cupressus sempervirens), wild olive (Olea oleaster), Phillyrea and other shrubs.

== Uses and status ==
The acorns are sweet and edible, and have been used by locals as a coffee replacement. They also have medicinal value. The species' population size appears to be stable, and it is listed as Least Concern (LC) by the IUCN and the Red List of Oaks, however, its coastal distribution means that ongoing development is a potential risk.

== Sources ==
- C.Michael Hogan. 2012. Oak. Encyclopedia of Earth. Eds. A.Dawson and C.J.Cleveland. Encyclopedia of Earth. National Council for Science and the Environment. Washington DC
