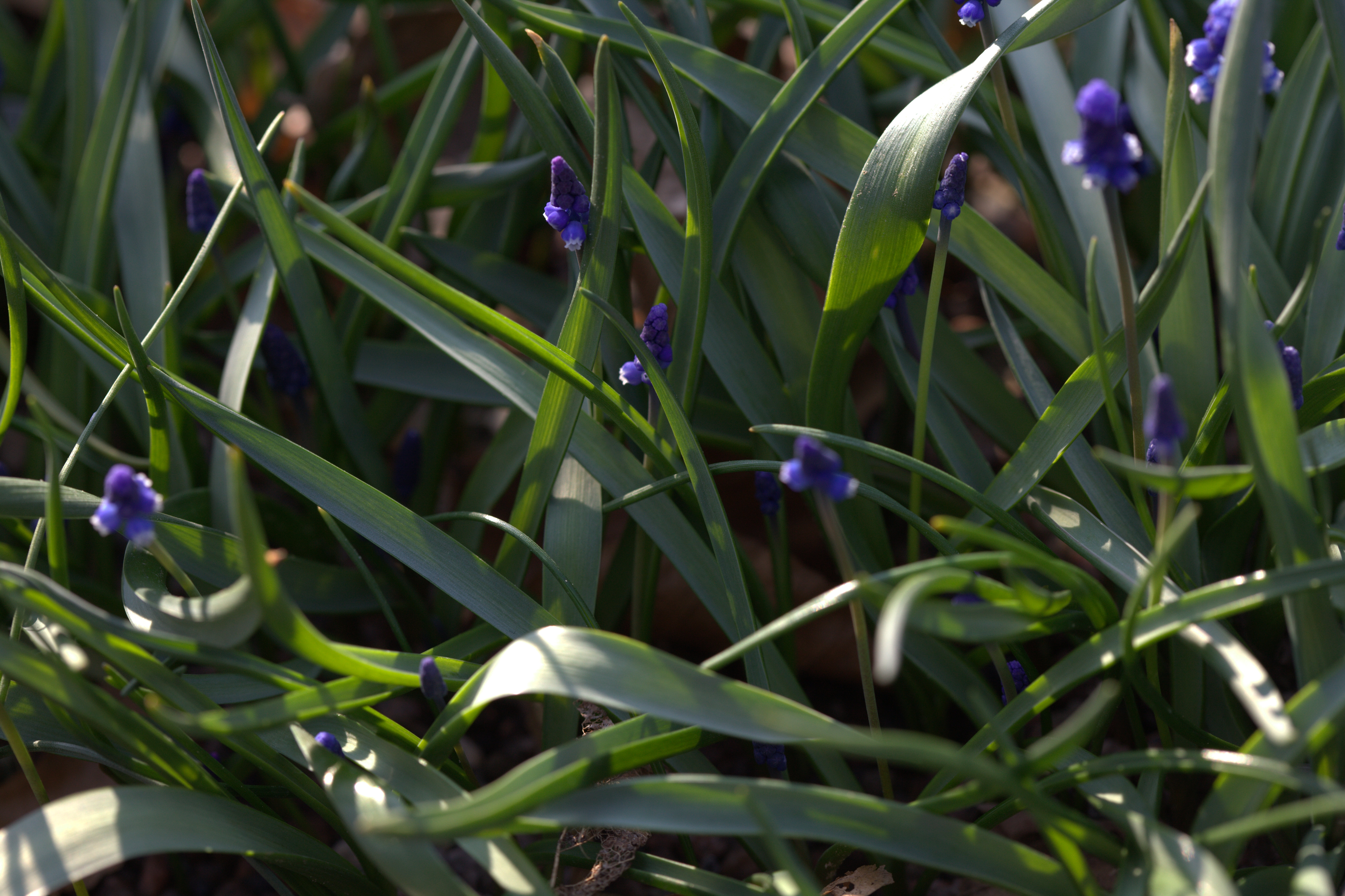

Scientific classification
- Kingdom: Plantae
- Clade: Tracheophytes
- Clade: Angiosperms
- Clade: Monocots
- Order: Asparagales
- Family: Asparagaceae
- Subfamily: Scilloideae
- Genus: Muscari
- Subgenus: Muscari subg. Muscari
- Species: M. aucheri

Binomial name
- Muscari aucheri (Boiss.) Baker

Synonyms
- Botryanthus aucheri Boiss.; M. lingulatum Baker; M. sintenisii Freyn; M. tubergenianum Hoog ex Turrill

= Muscari aucheri =

Species of plant in the asparagus family

Muscari aucheri, Aucher-Éloy grape hyacinth, is a species of flowering plant in the squill subfamily Scilloideae of the asparagus family Asparagaceae. It is a perennial bulbous plant, one of a number of species and genera known as grape hyacinths. Originally from Turkey, where it grows in grassy alpine areas, it is sometimes grown as an ornamental plant. The synonym M. tubergenianum (also spelt M. tubergianum) may be found in the horticultural literature.

The Latin specific epithet aucheri honours the French pharmacist and botanist Pierre Martin Rémi Aucher-Éloy (1792–1838) (one of numerous plants named for him).

== Description ==
M. aucheri is usually less than 10 centimetres (3.9 in) tall, although taller forms are known. There are usually only two or three leaves per bulb, relatively wide for a muscari, which have a greyish green upper side and a hooded or boat-shaped tip. The flowers are arranged in a dense spike or raceme. The lower fertile flowers are bright blue with whitish lobes or teeth around the mouth of the more or less spherical flower; the upper sterile flowers are a paler blue or almost white.

== Cultivation ==
In cultivation it is said to be easy to grow but not to increase very rapidly. The plant sold under the name M. tubergenianum is more robust than the wild form, or possibly a hybrid. This plant has gained the Royal Horticultural Society's Award of Garden Merit.

Numerous cultivars are available, such as 'Blue Magic', 'White Magic', 'Mount Hood' and 'Dark Eyes' (the last has also been listed as a cultivar of M. armeniacum or M. botryoides).
