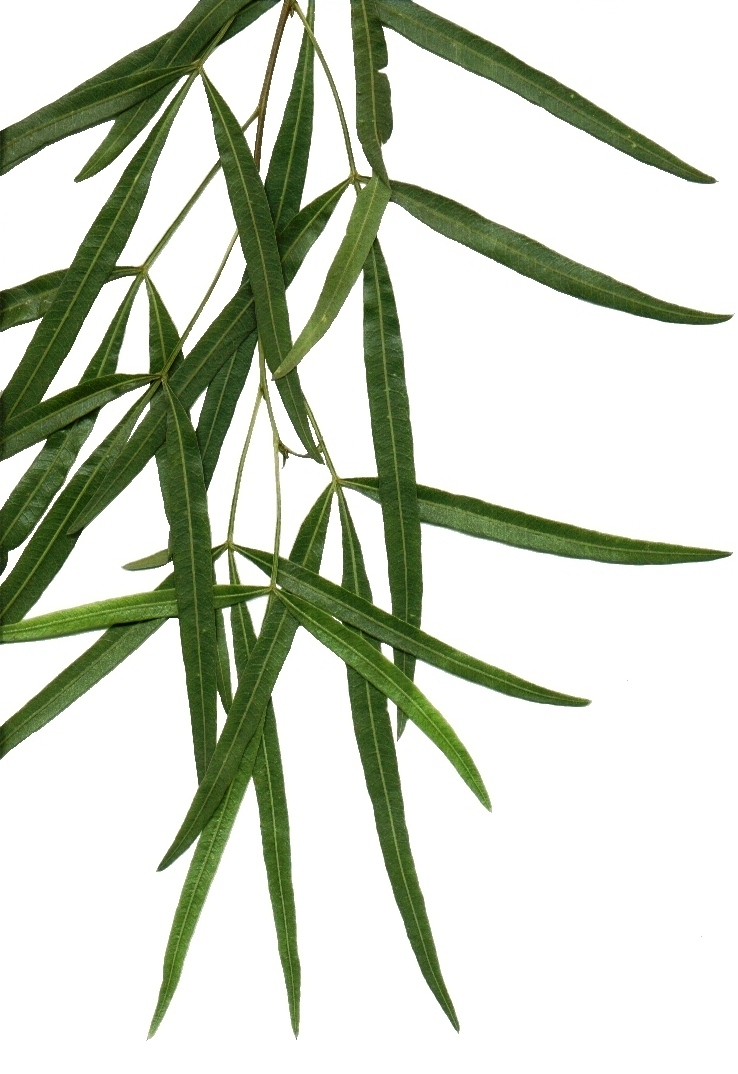
- Foliage detail

Conservation status
- Least Concern (IUCN 3.1)

Scientific classification
- Kingdom: Plantae
- Clade: Embryophytes
- Clade: Tracheophytes
- Clade: Spermatophytes
- Clade: Angiosperms
- Clade: Eudicots
- Clade: Rosids
- Order: Sapindales
- Family: Anacardiaceae
- Genus: Searsia
- Species: S. lancea

Binomial name
- Searsia lancea (L.f.) F.A.Barkley
- ● range records, IUCN (2018)

Synonyms
- Rhus lancea L.f.; Toxicodendron lanceum (L.f.) Kuntze

= Searsia lancea =

Karee

Species of tree belonging to the cashew and sumac family

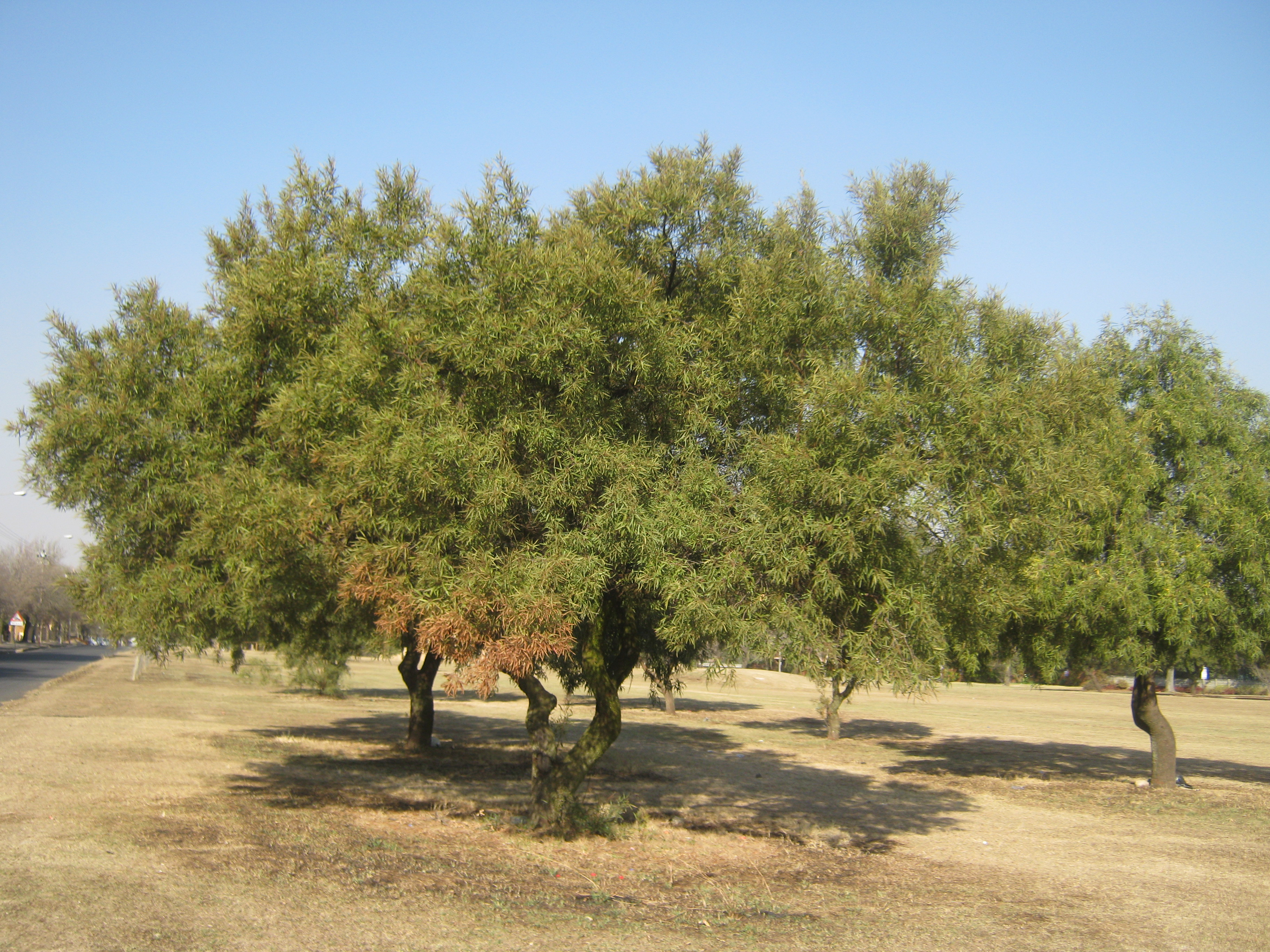
A cluster of karees in Germiston, Gauteng

Searsia lancea commonly known as karee (archaically karree), is an evergreen, frost hardy, drought resistant tree, which can reach up to 8 metres (26 ft) in height with a 5-metre (16 ft) spread. It is one of the most common trees on the Highveld and in the Bushveld in South Africa, but not found in the Lowveld. In North America, where it is naturalised, it is known as African sumac and willow rhus.

== Common names ==
S. lancea bears many names by locals in South Africa. By far the most common name for this tree is karee, which derives from the Khoekhoegowab name !areb. This is mostly used by speakers of Afrikaans. Other Afrikaans names are Rosyntjiebos from rosyn (raisin) and bos (bush).

In the Sotho–Tswana languages, the names mosilabele in Southern Sotho, mokalabata in Northern Sotho and mosabele in Tswana are cognates. In Khelobedu, the names is motshakhutshakhu and mushakaladza in Venda.

Among Nguni languages the name umhlakotshane in Zulu and Xhosa is used and in Swati the name given is inhlangutshane

== Description and uses ==
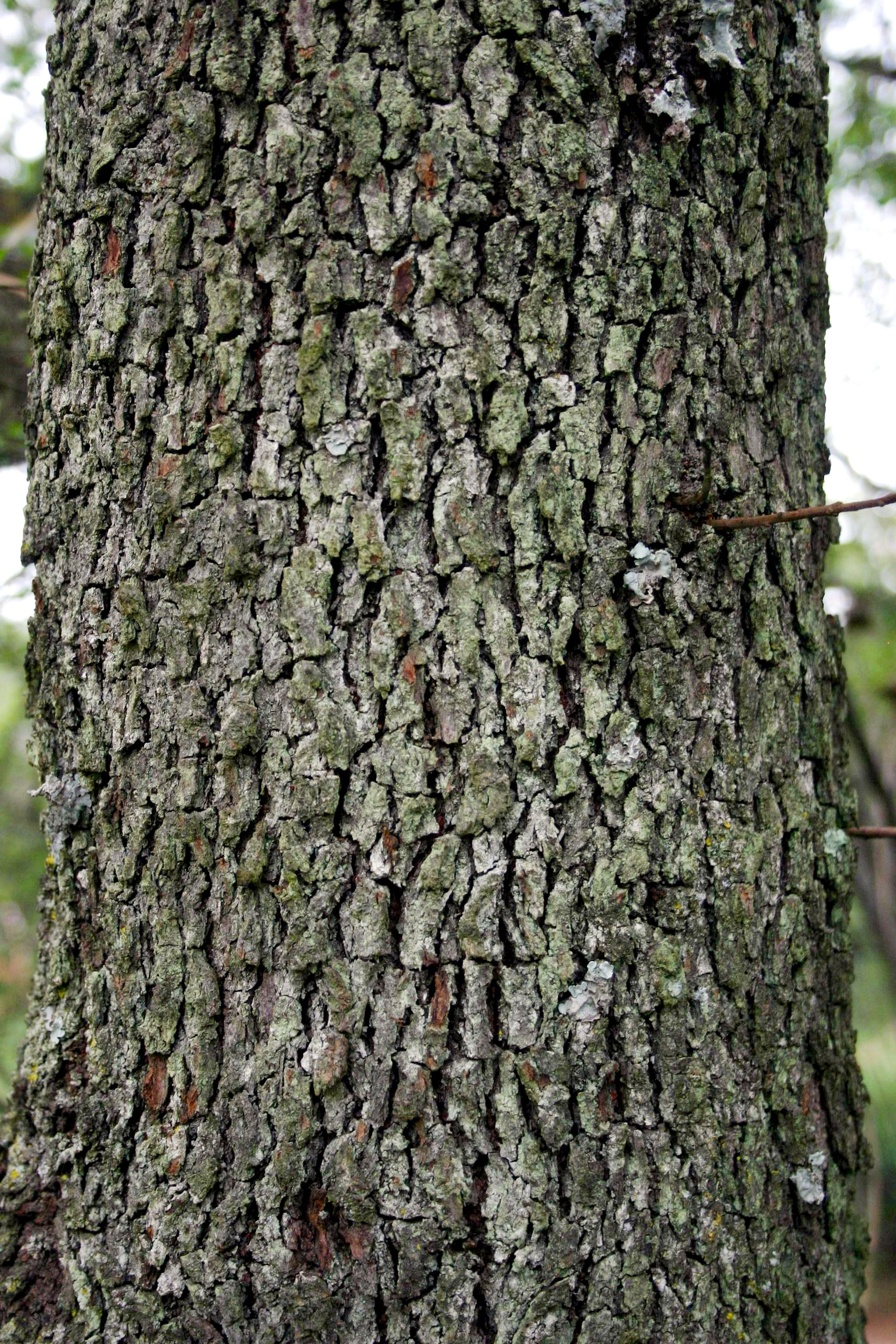
Bark

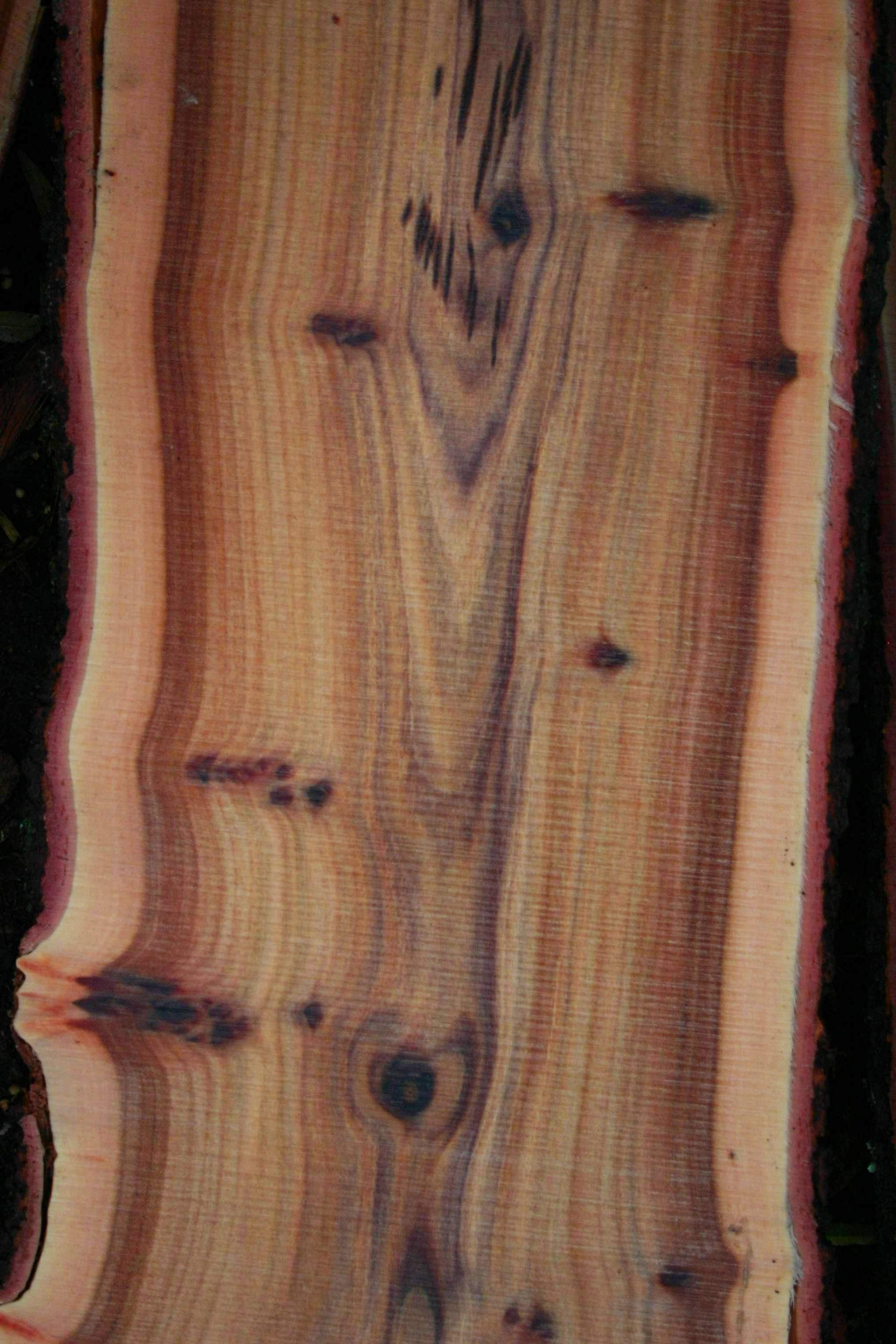
Wood

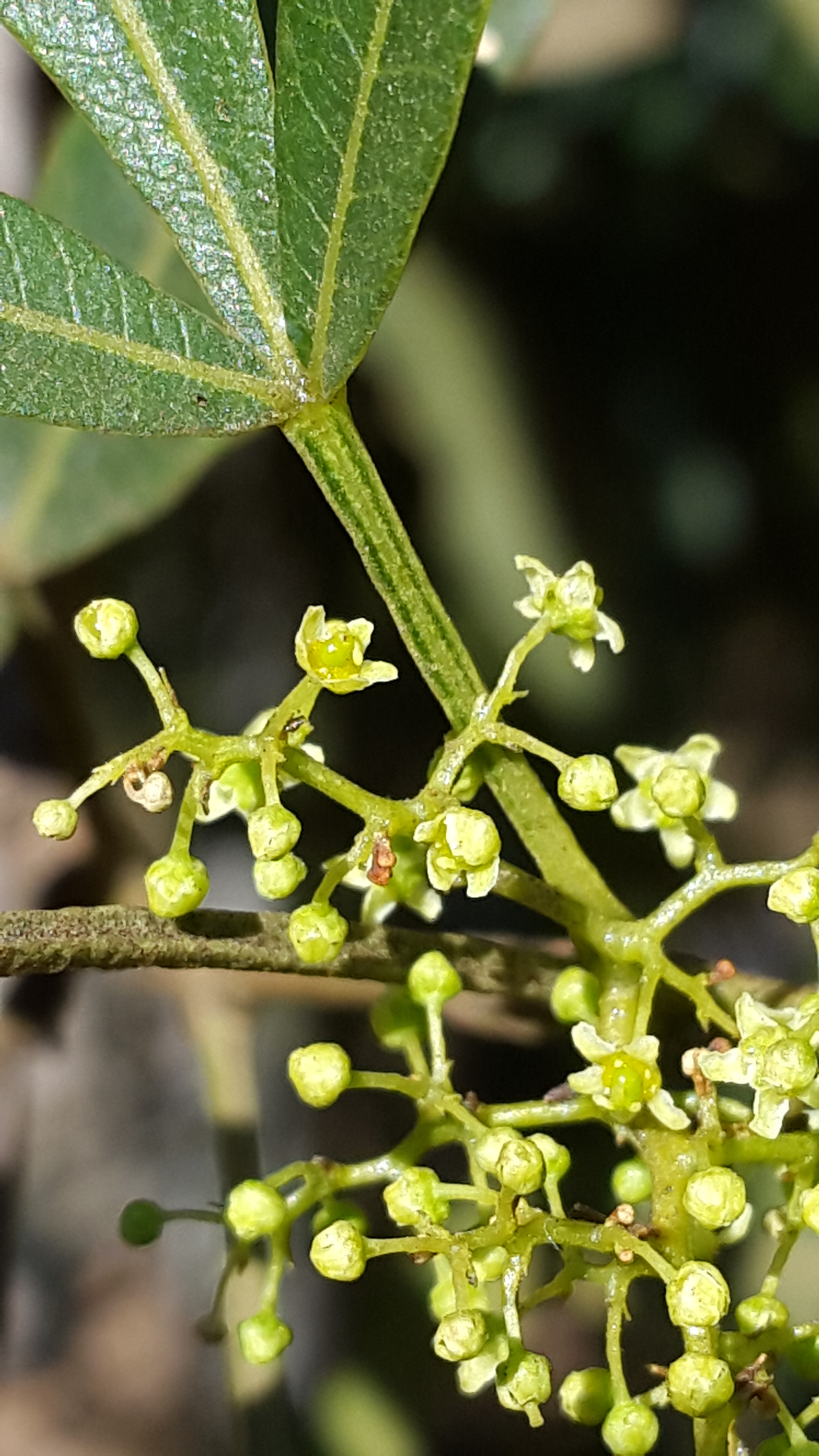
The small yellow flowers of a female tree

The tree is dioecious. It has a graceful, weeping form and dark, fissured bark that contrasts well with its long, thinnish, hairless, dark-green, trifoliate leaves with smooth margins. It bears small yellow flowers followed on female trees by bunches of small yellow-green flattish fruits, which are relished by birds. In earlier times the fruits were pounded, water added and left to ferment, producing an evidently refreshing beer. The tree is a good shade tree for gardens, parks and pavements. It favours areas rich in lime in the Karoo and Namibia.
