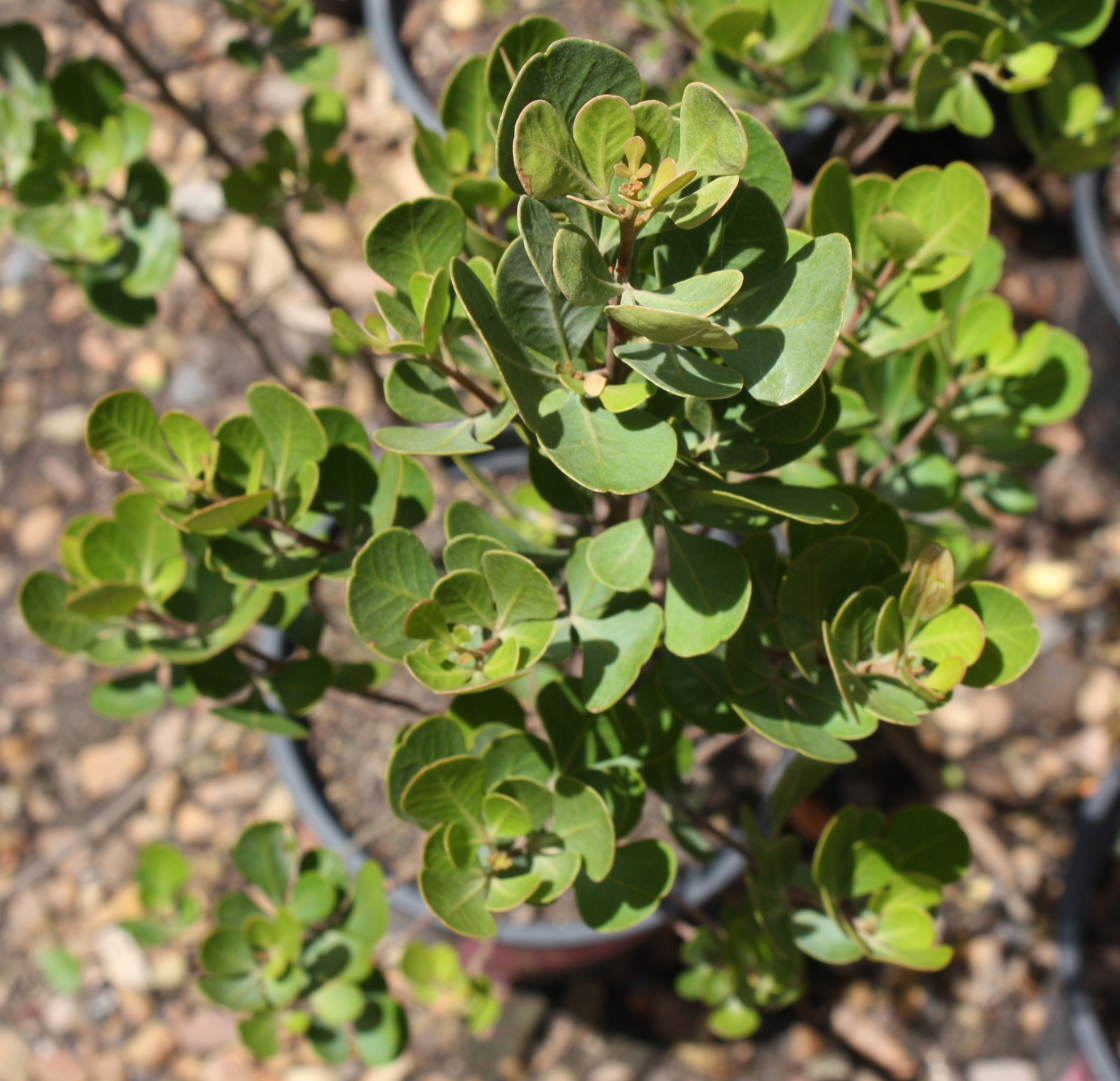
- Detail of Searsia glauca foliage

Scientific classification
- Kingdom: Plantae
- Clade: Tracheophytes
- Clade: Angiosperms
- Clade: Eudicots
- Clade: Rosids
- Order: Sapindales
- Family: Anacardiaceae
- Genus: Searsia
- Species: S. glauca

Binomial name
- Searsia glauca (Thunb.) Moffett (2007)

Synonyms
- Rhus glauca Thunb. (1803); Rhus thunbergiana Schult. (1820); Toxicodendron glaucum (Thunb.) Kuntze (1891)

= Searsia glauca =

Species of tree

Searsia glauca (or the blue kuni-rhus) is a small, compact tree or bush native to the Cape Provinces of South Africa. Although commonest near the coast, it is also found inland among fynbos vegetation. Searsia glauca has potential medicinal effects and antioxidant properties that can aid in the prevention of cell injury or death.

== Description ==
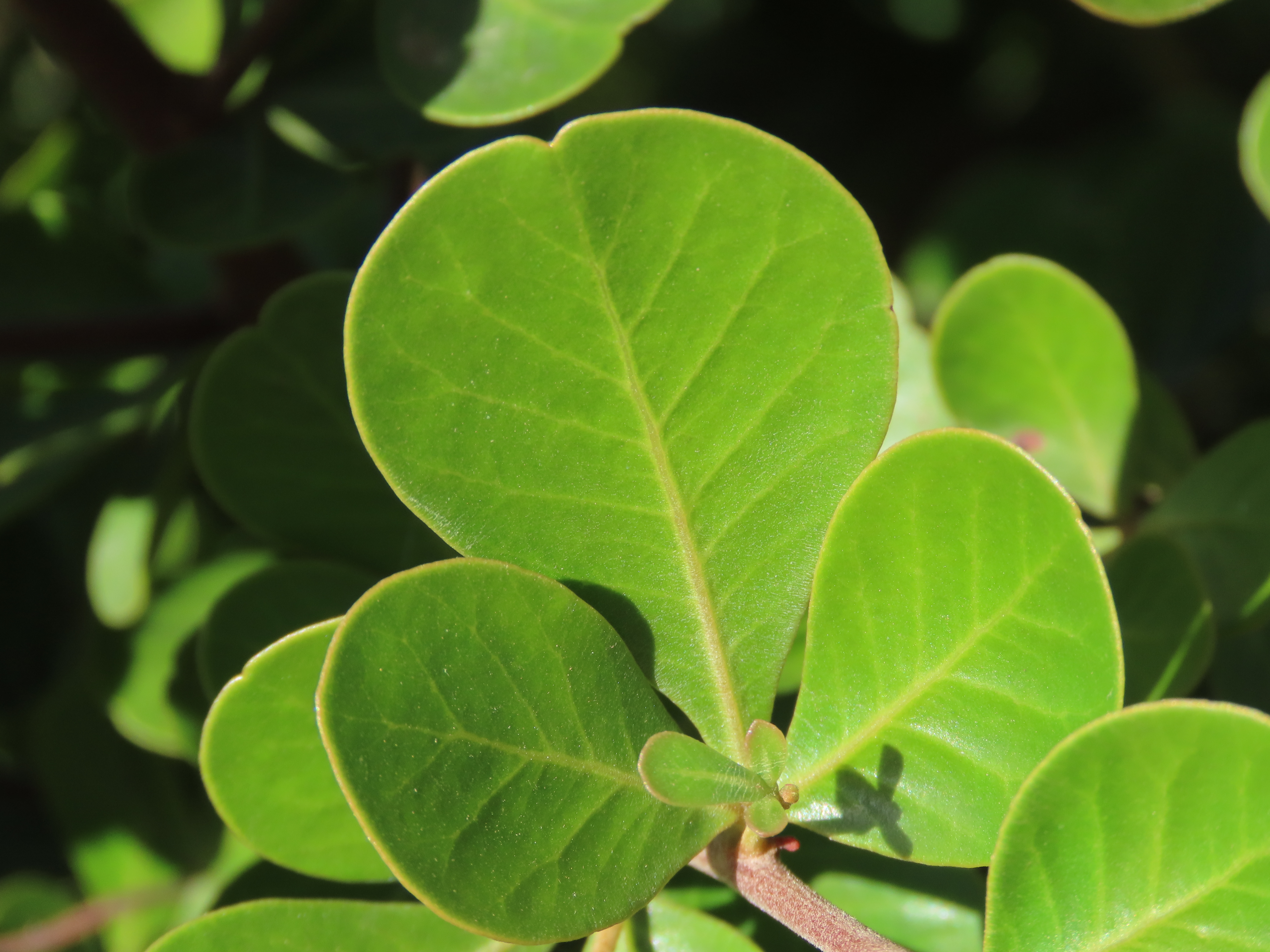
Searsia glauca leaf detail.

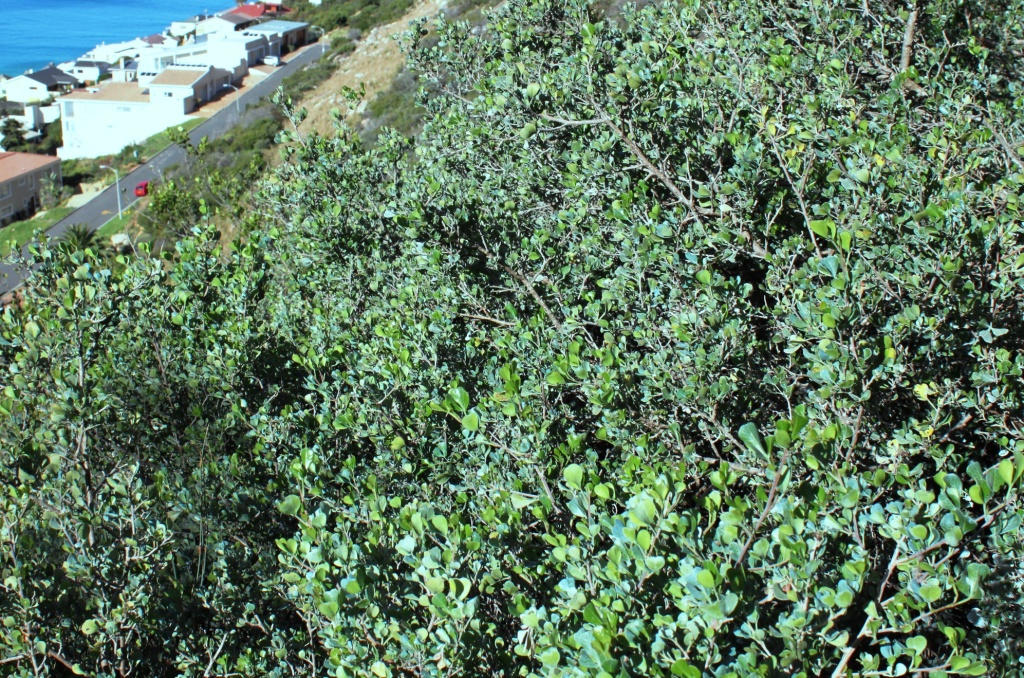
Adult Searsia glauca specimen.

The leaves are characteristically glossy/shiny and often a slightly glaucous (blue-green) colour. The leaves are trifoliate, with three obtuse (obcordate-cuneate) leaflets.

It is dioecious, with male and female flowers on separate plants. The fruits reach a maximum diameter of 5 mm (distinguishing it from Searsia undulata which has 3mm fruits).

== Distribution ==
This species occurs along the coast of South Africa, as well as in certain areas inland. It occurs from Velddrif and Cape Town in the west, eastwards into the Eastern Cape Province.

Inland it occurs in the Little Karoo, around Worcester, Oudtshoorn, Baviaanskloof and northwards into Zimbabwe.
