= Caloptilia xanthochiria =

Scientific classification
- Kingdom: Animalia
- Phylum: Arthropoda
- Class: Insecta
- Order: Lepidoptera
- Family: Gracillariidae
- Genus: Caloptilia
- Species: C. xanthochiria

Binomial name
- Caloptilia xanthochiria Vári, 1961

Species of moth

Caloptilia xanthochiria is a moth of the family Gracillariidae. It is known from South Africa and Réunion.

Hostplant: This species feeds on Searsia longipes (Anacardiaceae).
