= Searsia brenanii =

Conservation status
- Endangered (IUCN 3.1)

Scientific classification
- Kingdom: Plantae
- Clade: Tracheophytes
- Clade: Angiosperms
- Clade: Eudicots
- Clade: Rosids
- Order: Sapindales
- Family: Anacardiaceae
- Genus: Searsia
- Species: S. brenanii

Binomial name
- Searsia brenanii (Kokwaro) Moffett

Synonyms
- Rhus brenanii Kokwaro

Species of plant

Searsia brenanii is a species of plant in the family Anacardiaceae. It is endemic to Tanzania. It is threatened by habitat loss.
