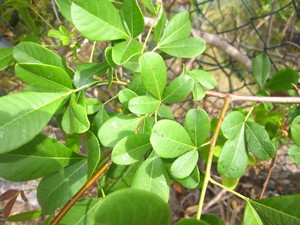

Conservation status
- Least Concern (IUCN 3.1)

Scientific classification
- Kingdom: Plantae
- Clade: Tracheophytes
- Clade: Angiosperms
- Clade: Eudicots
- Clade: Rosids
- Order: Sapindales
- Family: Anacardiaceae
- Genus: Searsia
- Species: S. longipes

Binomial name
- Searsia longipes (Engl.) Moffett

Synonyms
- Rhus glutinosa var. obtusifolia Engl. Rhus incana var. grandifolia Robyns & Lawalrée; Rhus longipes Engl. Rhus longipes var. grandifolia (Oliv.) Meikle; Rhus ruzizensis Engl. Rhus villosa var. grandifolia Oliv. Rhus villosa var. usambarensis Engl. Toxicodendron longipes (Engl.) Kuntze

= Searsia longipes =

Species of plant

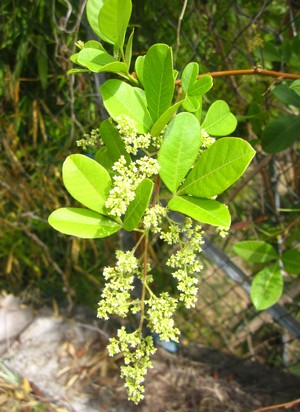
Searsia longipes flowers

Searsia longipes is a medium-sized, semi-deciduous, trifoliate tree of up to 10 m tall. It occurs in Africa from Burkina Faso to South Africa, as well as the islands of the Indian Ocean.

In Zimbabwe it is found at altitudes between 1000 and 1680 m - in other places this species can also be found at sea level.

Hostplant: The gracillaridae lepidoptera Caloptilia xanthochiria Vári, 1961 feed on this plant.
