= Searsia pallens =

Scientific classification
- Kingdom: Plantae
- Clade: Tracheophytes
- Clade: Angiosperms
- Clade: Eudicots
- Clade: Rosids
- Order: Sapindales
- Family: Anacardiaceae
- Genus: Searsia
- Species: S. pallens

Binomial name
- Searsia pallens (Eckl. & Zeyh.) Moffett

Synonyms
- Rhus nervosa Eckl. & Zeyh.; Rhus pallens Eckl. & Zeyh.; Rhus plicifolia Eckl. & Zeyh.

Species of plant

Searsia pallens is a species of flowering plant in the family Anarcadiaceae. It is a shrub native to Botswana, South Africa, and Lesotho.
