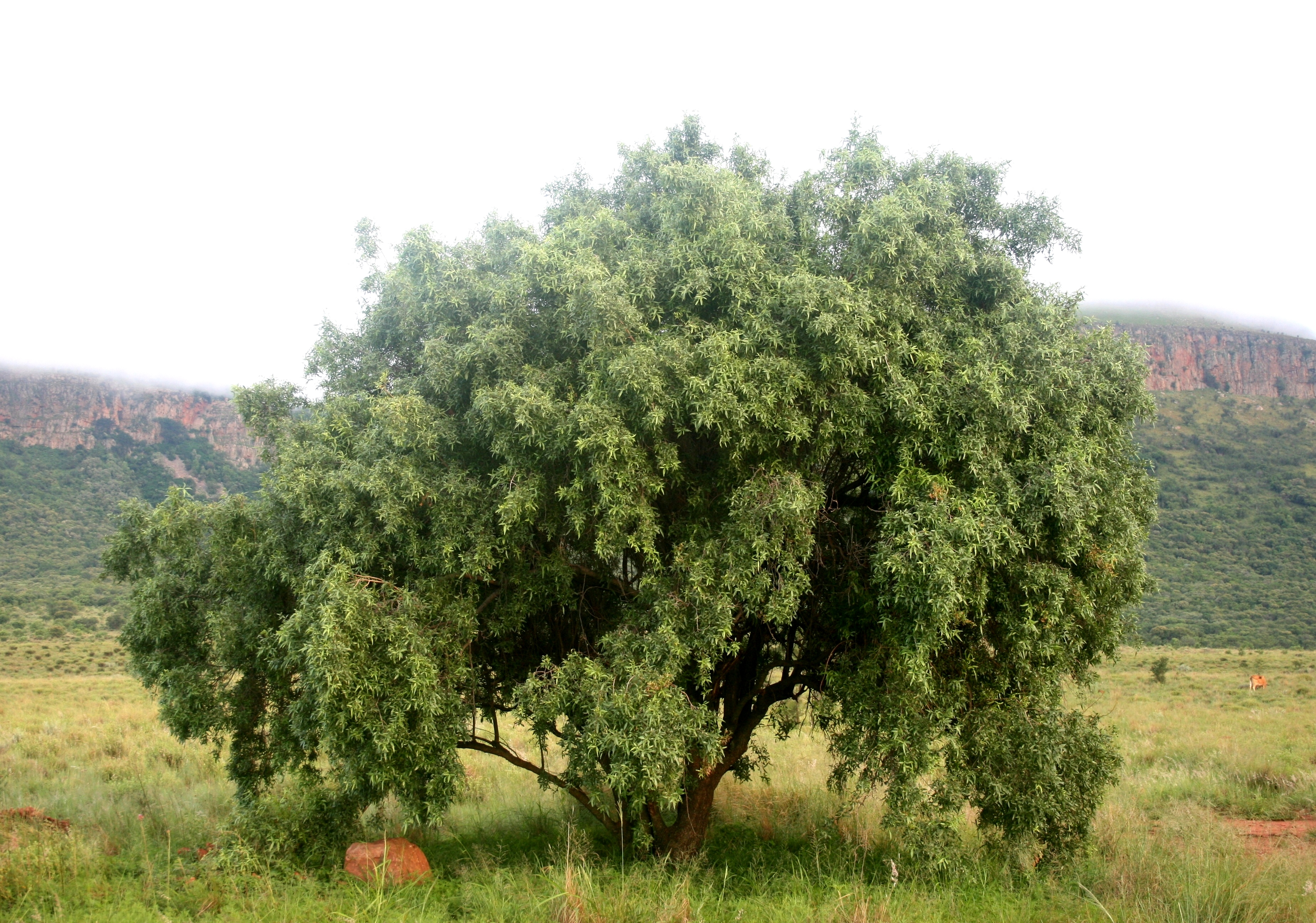
- Habit in the Magaliesberg, North West

Scientific classification
- Kingdom: Plantae
- Clade: Tracheophytes
- Clade: Angiosperms
- Clade: Eudicots
- Clade: Rosids
- Order: Sapindales
- Family: Anacardiaceae
- Genus: Searsia
- Species: S. leptodictya

Binomial name
- Searsia leptodictya (Diels) T.S.Yi, A.J.Mill. & J.Wen

Synonyms
- Rhus amerina Meikle; Rhus leptodictya Diels; Rhus rhombocarpa R.Fern. & A.Fern.

= Searsia leptodictya =

Mountain karee

Species of tree

Searsia leptodictya is known as mountain karee in English, bergkaree in Afrikaans, and mohlwehlwe in Sotho. An evergreen tree reaching a height of 5 metres and a similar spread, it is drought resistant but only semi frost hardy. It is an attractive small tree with a rounded crown and a pleasing weeping effect. It can be planted in full sun or in partial shade. The tree bears small white flowers, which on female trees turn into bunches of small berry type fruit, which attract birds who feed on the berries. The tree is an attractive tree for a small garden. The berries can be brewed into a beer.

== Gallery ==
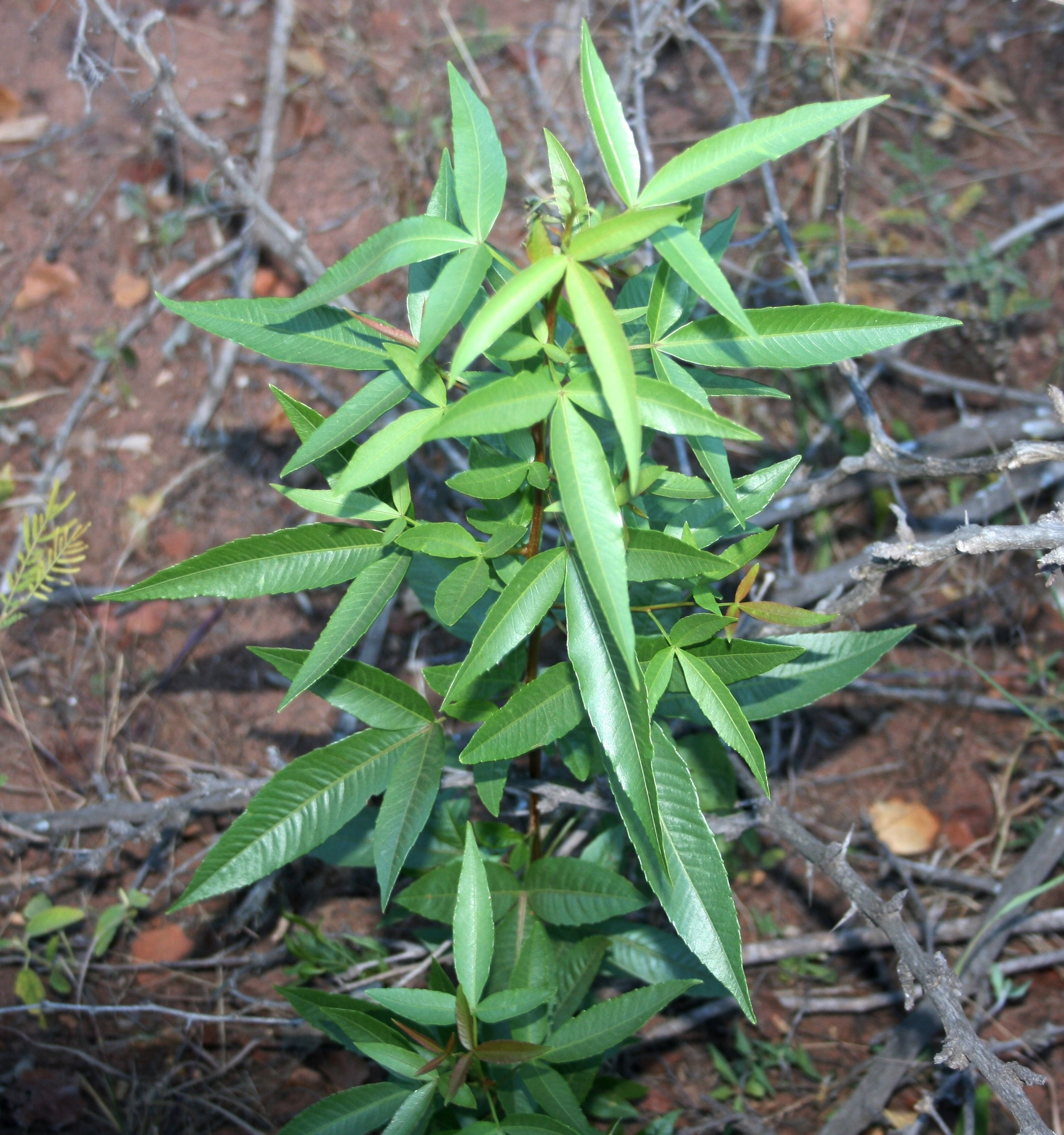
Sapling in the Waterberg, Limpopo

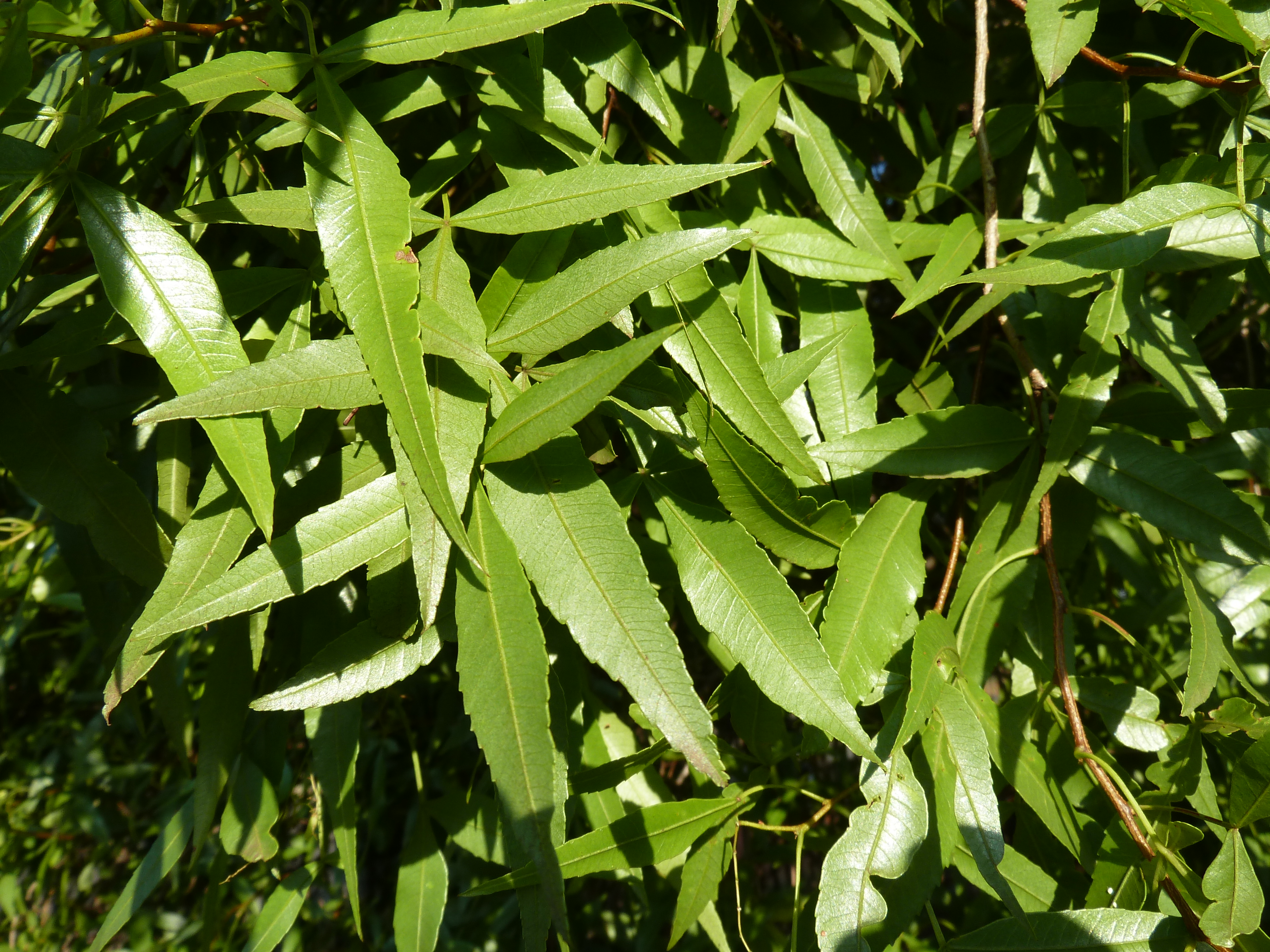
Close-up of foliage

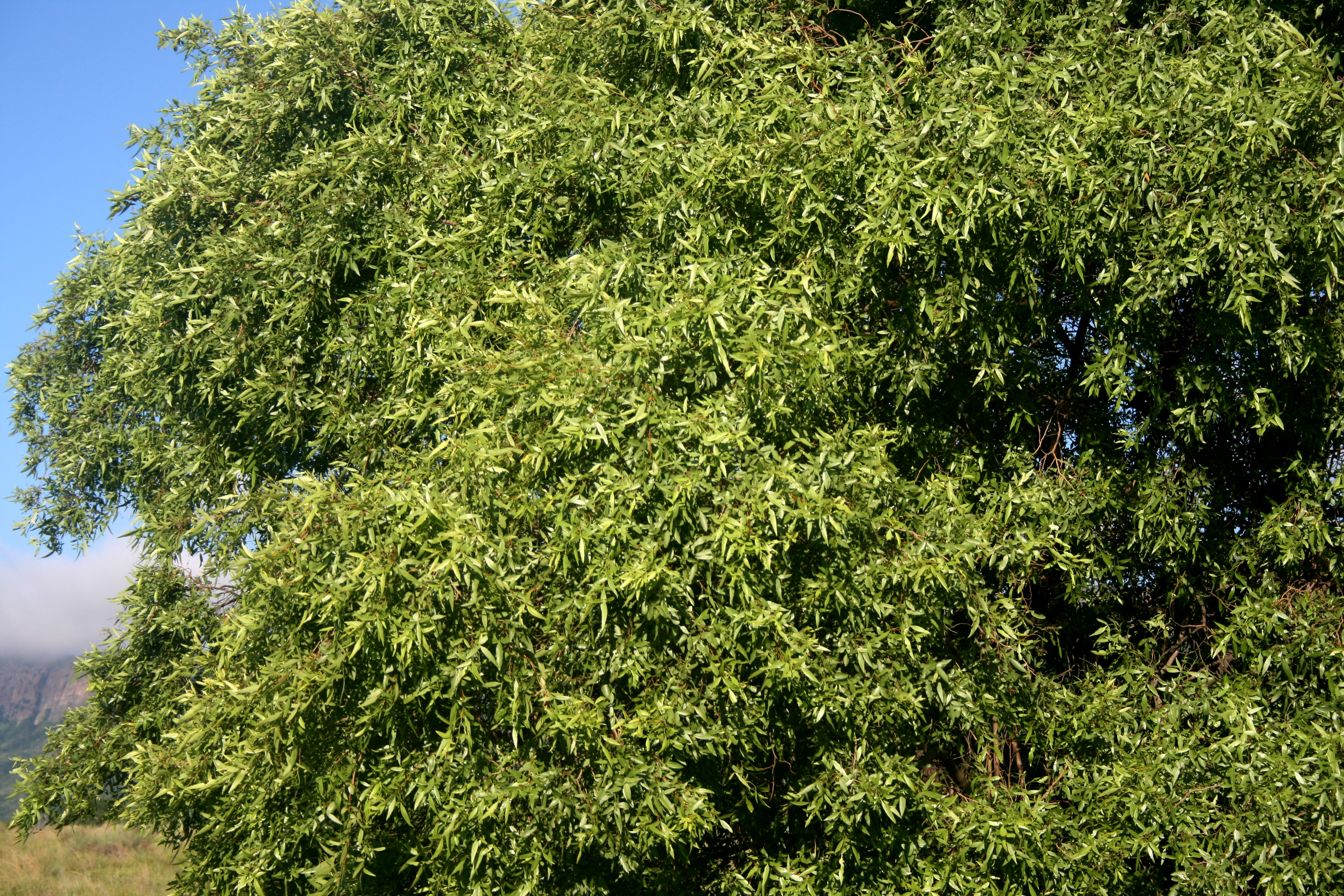
Dense leafy canopy

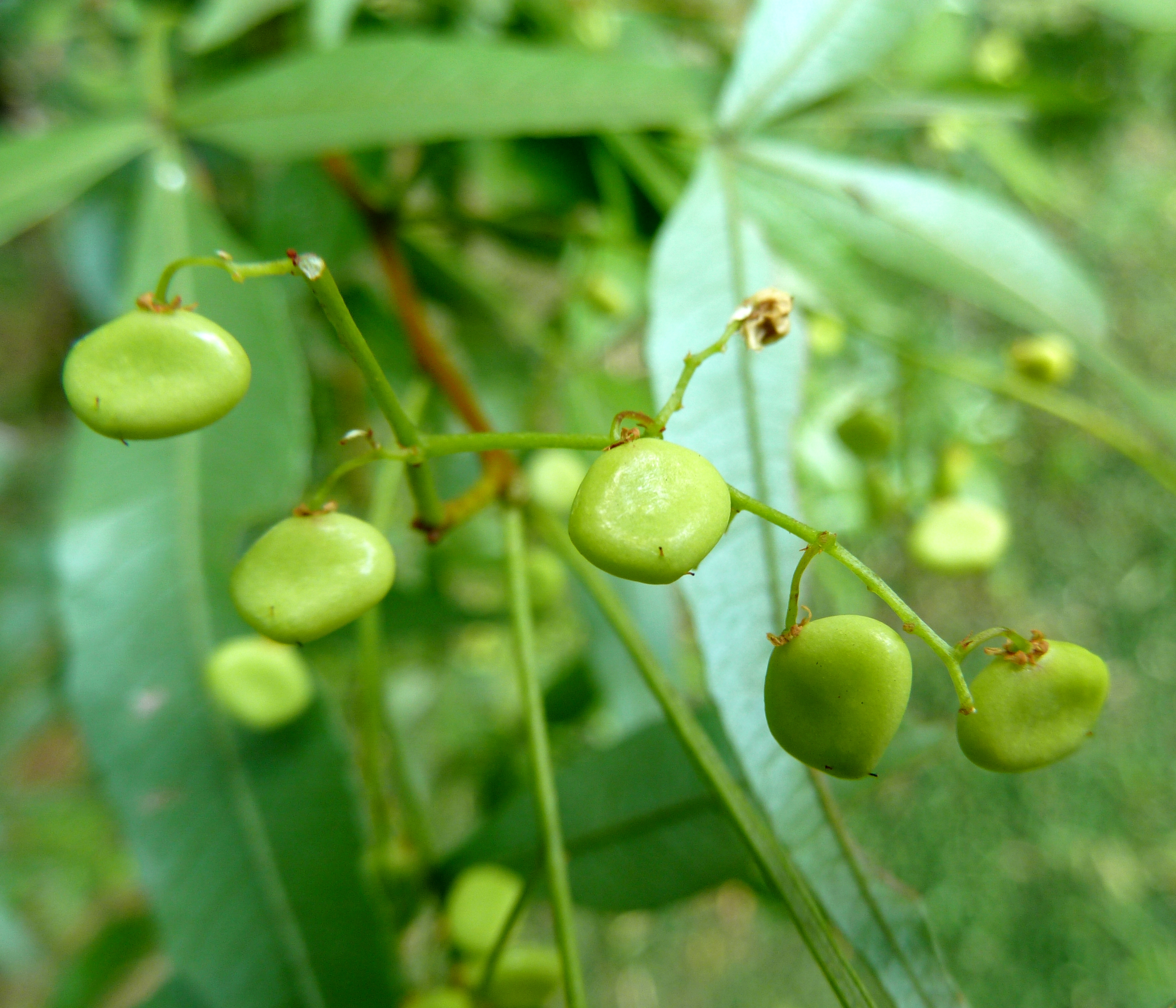
Fruit

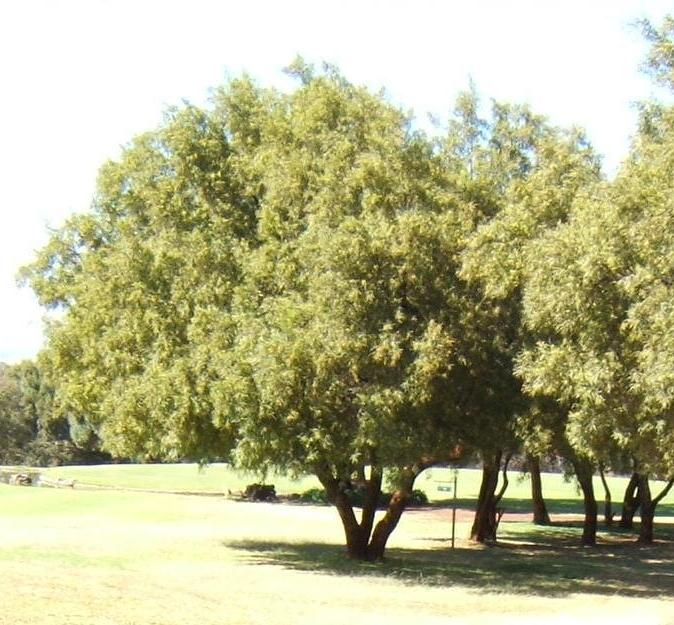
As ornamentals at a resort
