= Searsia aucheri =

Conservation status
- Near Threatened (IUCN 2.3)

Scientific classification
- Kingdom: Plantae
- Clade: Tracheophytes
- Clade: Angiosperms
- Clade: Eudicots
- Clade: Rosids
- Order: Sapindales
- Family: Anacardiaceae
- Genus: Searsia
- Species: S. aucheri

Binomial name
- Searsia aucheri (Boiss.) Moffett

Synonyms
- Rhus aucheri Boiss.; Toxicodendron aucheri (Boiss.) Kuntze

Species of plant

Searsia aucheri is a species of plant in the family Anacardiaceae. It is endemic to Oman.

It grows in the foothills of the Hajar Mountains of northern Oman, where it is common in wadis and on rocky slopes.
