= Pierre Martin Rémi Aucher-Éloy =

French pharmacist and botanist

Pierre Martin Rémi Aucher-Éloy (2 October 1792 – 6 October 1838) was a French pharmacist and botanist who was a native of Blois. The standard author abbreviation Aucher is used to indicate this person as the author when citing a botanical name.

== Biography ==
He received his education at Orléans and later Paris. Beginning in 1817, he operated a bookstore in Blois, and in 1820, also a print shop. In 1826 he returned to Paris as owner of a print shop. In 1830 he relocated to Istanbul with aims of creating an Herbier d'Orient (today's Middle East). For the next several years he collected and studied plants throughout Asia Minor, Cyprus, Greece, Egypt, the Sinai Peninsula, Chios, Kos, Syria, Persia, Oman, et al. Stricken by exhaustion and illness, he died near Isfahan on 6 October 1838.

Aucher-Éloy sold his collections to the Museum National d'Histoire Naturelle in Paris, from where they were distributed to various herbaria. His book Relations de Voyages en Orient de 1830 à 1838 was published posthumously in 1843.

== Legacy ==
Aucher-Éloy's name is remembered in the Latin specific epithet of several plants, as chosen by a number of his fellow botanists, including:

- Ferula aucheri - Boiss.
- Iris aucheri - (Baker) Sealy (common name: Aucher-Éloy iris)
- Muscari aucheri - (Boiss.) Baker (common name: Aucher-Éloy grape hyacinth)
- Olea aucheri - A.Chev. ex Ehrend. (taxonomic synonym for Olea europaea subsp. cuspidata)
- Quercus aucheri - Jaub. & Spach
- Rhus aucheri - Boiss.
