= Fred Alexander Barkley =

Fred Alexander Barkley (1908–1989) was an American botanist. Barkley studied at the University of Oklahoma and was awarded a PhD from the Washington University in St. Louis in 1937.
