= T. striatum =

T. striatum may refer to:

- Toxicodendron striatum, a South American tree species
- Trifolium striatum, the knotted clover, a plant species
