= Lacquer dermatitis =

- Other names: Lacquer sensitivity
- Specialty: Dermatology

Lacquer dermatitis, also known as lacquer sensitivity, is a cutaneous condition characterized by a contact dermatitis to various lacquers.

== See also ==
- Toxicodendron dermatitis
- List of cutaneous conditions
