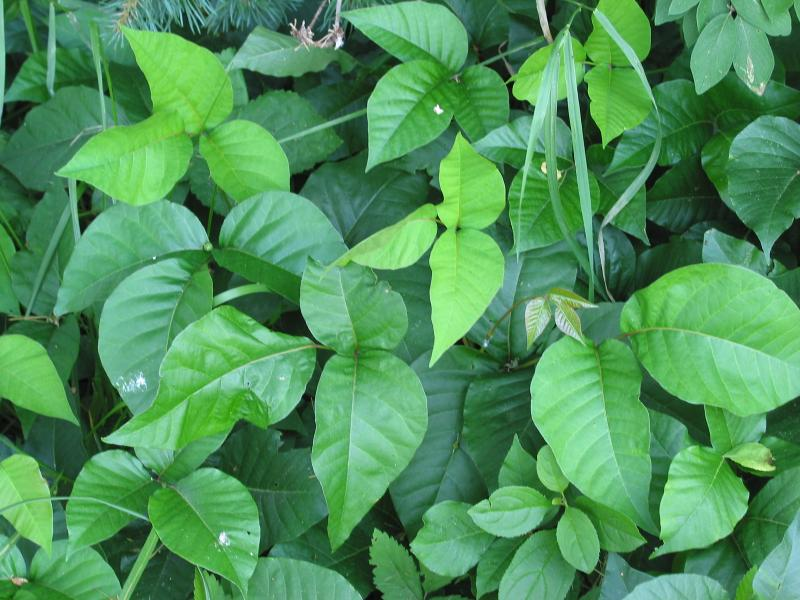
- Toxicodendron radicans

Scientific classification
- Kingdom: Plantae
- Clade: Tracheophytes
- Clade: Angiosperms
- Clade: Eudicots
- Clade: Rosids
- Order: Sapindales
- Family: Anacardiaceae
- Subfamily: Anacardioideae
- Genus: Toxicodendron; Mill.

Type species
- Toxicodendron pubescens Mill.

Species
- 29; see text

Synonyms
- Albonia Buc'hoz, nom. nud.; Augia Lour., nom. rej.; Philostemon Raf.; Vernix Adans.

= Toxicodendron =

Genus of plants

Toxicodendron is a genus of flowering plants in the sumac family, Anacardiaceae. It contains trees, shrubs and woody vines, including poison ivy, poison oak, and the lacquer tree. The best-known members of the genus in North America are eastern poison ivy (T. radicans) and western poison oak (T. diversilobum), both ubiquitous throughout much of their respective region.

All members of the genus produce the skin-irritating oil urushiol, which can cause a severe allergic reaction known as urushiol-induced contact dermatitis. The resins of certain species native to Japan, China and other Asian countries, such as lacquer tree (T. vernicifluum) and wax tree (T. succedaneum), are used to make lacquer, and, as a byproduct of lacquer manufacture, their berries are used to make japan wax.

== Description ==
Plants in the genus have pinnately compound, alternate leaves and whitish or grayish drupes. They are quite variable in appearance. The leaves may have smooth, toothed, or lobed edges, and all three types of leaf edges may be present in a single plant. The plants grow as creeping vines, climbing vines, shrubs, or, in the case of lacquer tree (T. vernicifluum) and poison sumac (T. vernix), as trees. While leaves of poison ivy and poison oaks usually have three leaflets, sometimes there are five or, occasionally, even seven leaflets. Leaves of poison sumac have 7–13 leaflets, and of Lacquer Tree, 7–19 leaflets.

== Taxonomy ==
It was published by Philip Miller in 1754. The lectotype species is Toxicodendron pubescens Mill. The genus is a member of the Rhus complex, and has at various times been categorized as being either its own genus or a sub-genus of Rhus. There is evidence which points to keeping Toxicodendron as a separate monophyletic genus, but researchers have stated that the Toxicodendron and Rhus groups are complex and require more study to be fully understood.

The common names come from similar appearances to other species that are not closely related and to the allergic response to the urushiol. Poison oak is not an oak (Quercus, family Fagaceae), but this common name comes from the leaves' resemblance to white oak (Quercus alba) leaves, while poison ivy is not an ivy (Hedera, family Araliaceae), but has a superficially similar growth form. Technically, the plants do not contain a poison; they contain a potent allergen.

=== Species ===
29 species are accepted (as of November 2024).

- Toxicodendron acuminatum (DC.) C.Y.Wu & T.L.Ming (synonym Rhus acuminata) – China, Bhutan, India and Nepal.
- Toxicodendron bimannii Barbhuiya – Assam
- Toxicodendron borneense (Stapf) Gillis – Borneo
- Toxicodendron calcicola C.Y.Wu – endemic to China
- Toxicodendron delavayi (Franch.) F.A.Barkley – southwestern Sichuan and northwestern and central Yunnan in south-central China
- Toxicodendron diversilobum (Torr. & A.Gray) Greene (synonym Rhus diversiloba) – Western poison oak is found throughout much of western North America, ranging from the Pacific coast into the Sierra Nevada and Cascade mountain ranges between southern British Columbia and southward into Baja California. It is extremely common in that region, where it is the predominant species of the genus. Indeed, it is California's most prevalent woody shrub. Extremely variable, it grows as a dense shrub in open sunlight, or as a climbing vine in shaded areas. It propagates by creeping rhizomes or by seed. The compound leaves are divided into three leaflets, 35–100 mm long, with scalloped, toothed, or lobed edges. The leaves may be red, yellow, green, or some combination of those colors, depending on various factors, such as the time of year.
- Toxicodendron fulvum (Craib) C.Y.Wu & T.L.Ming – southern Yunnan and northern Thailand
- Toxicodendron grandiflorum C.Y.Wu & T.L.Ming – Yunnan and southwestern Sichuan in south-central China
- Toxicodendron griffithii (Hook.f.) Kuntze – eastern Himalayas to Yunnan and southwestern Guizhou in south-central China
- Toxicodendron hirtellum C.Y.Wu – southern Sichuan
- Toxicodendron hookeri (K.C.Sahni & Bahadur) C.Y.Wu & T.L.Ming – eastern Nepal to Assam
- Toxicodendron khasianum (Hook.f.) Kuntze – Assam and Bangladesh
- Toxicodendron × lobadioides Greene (T. diversilobum × T. rydbergii) – Washington in the northwestern United States
- Toxicodendron nodosum (Blume) Kuntze – western Malesia and southwestern Sulawesi
- Toxicodendron oligophyllum S.L.Tang, Liang Ma & S.P.Chen – Fujian in southeastern China
- Toxicodendron orientale Greene (synonyms Rhus orientale and R. ambigua) – Asian poison ivy is very similar to the American poison ivy, and replaces it throughout east Asia (so similar that some texts treat it as just a variety of the American species).
- Toxicodendron pubescens Mill. (synonym Rhus toxicarium) – Atlantic poison oak grows mostly in sandy soils in eastern parts of the United States. Growing as a shrub, its leaves are in groups of three. Leaves are typically rounded or lobed and are densely haired. Although it is often confused with the more common poison ivy, even in the scientific literature, Atlantic poison oak has small clumps of hair on the veins on the underside of the leaves, while poison ivy does not.
- Toxicodendron quinquefoliolatum Q.H.Chen – Guizhou in south-central China
- Toxicodendron radicans (L.) Kuntze (synonym Rhus radicans) – Poison ivy is extremely common in some areas of North America. In the United States, it grows in all states east of the Rockies. It also grows in Central America. Appearing as a creeping vine, a climbing vine, or a shrub, it reproduces both by creeping rootstocks and by seeds. The appearance varies. Leaves, arranged in an alternate pattern, usually in groups of three, are from 20 to 50 mm long, pointed at the tip, and can be toothed, smooth, or lobed, but never serrated. Leaves may be shiny or dull, and the color varies with the season. Vines grow almost straight up rather than wrapping around their support and can grow to 8–10 m in height. In some cases, Poison ivy may entirely engulf the supporting structure, and vines may extend outward like limbs so that it appears to be a Poison ivy "tree".
- Toxicodendron rhetsoides (Craib) Tardieu – Thailand, Laos, and Vietnam
- Toxicodendron rostratum T.L.Ming & Z.F.Chen – southern Yunnan
- Toxicodendron rydbergii (Small ex Rydb.) Greene (synonym Rhus rydbergii) – Western poison ivy is found in northern parts of the eastern United States. It also exists in the western United States and Canada but is much less common than poison oak. It may grow as a vine or a shrub. It was once considered a subspecies of poison ivy. It does sometimes hybridize with the climbing species. Western poison ivy is found in much of western and central United States and Canada, although not on the West Coast. In the eastern United States, it is rarely found south of New England.
- Toxicodendron striatum (Ruiz & Pav.) Kuntze (synonym Rhus striata) – Manzanillo is a South American poisonous tree growing in the tropical rain forests on low elevation slopes. The name should not be confused with the unrelated Manchineel, a poisonous tree that is not a member of the Anacardiaceae.
- Toxicodendron succedaneum (L.) Kuntze (synonym Rhus succedanea) – Wax tree is native of Asia, although it has been planted elsewhere, most notably in Australia and New Zealand. It is a large shrub or tree, up to 8 m tall, somewhat similar to a sumac tree. Because of its beautiful autumn foliage, it has been planted outside of Asia as an ornamental plant, often by gardeners who were apparently unaware of the dangers of allergic reactions. It is now officially classified as a noxious weed in Australia and New Zealand. The fatty-acid methyl ester of the kernel oil meets all of the major biodiesel requirements in the USA (ASTM D 6751-02, ASTM PS 121-99), Germany (DIN V 51606) and European Union (EN 14214).
- Toxicodendron sylvestre (Siebold & Zucc.) Kuntze (synonym Rhus sylvestris) – native to China, Japan, Korea and Taiwan.
- Toxicodendron trichocarpum (Miq.) Kuntze – southern China, Korea, Japan, and Kuril Islands
- Toxicodendron vernicifluum (Stokes) F.A.Barkley (synonym Rhus verniciflua) – Lacquer tree or varnish tree grows in Asia, especially China and Japan. Growing up to 20 m tall, its sap produces an extremely durable lacquer. The leaves have 7–19 leaflets (most often 11–13). The sap contains the allergenic oil, urushiol. Urushiol gets its name from this species which in Japanese is called Urushi. Other names for this species include Japanese lacquer tree, Japanese Varnish Tree, and Japanese Sumac (Note: the term "varnish tree" is also occasionally applied to the Candlenut, Aleurites moluccana, a southeast Asian tree unrelated to Toxicodendron).
- Toxicodendron vernix (L.) Kuntze (synonym Rhus vernix) – Poison sumac is a tall shrub or a small tree, from 2–7 m tall. It is found in swampy, open areas and reproduces by seeds. The leaves have between 7–13 untoothed leaflets, in a feather-compound arrangement. In terms of its potential to cause urushiol-induced contact dermatitis, poison sumac is far more virulent than other Toxicodendron species, even more virulent than poison ivy and poison oak. According to some botanists, T. vernix is the most toxic plant species in the United States (Frankel, 1991).
- Toxicodendron wallichii (Hook.f.) Kuntze – Himalayas, southern Tibet, southern China, Vietnam, and northern Thailand
- Toxicodendron yunnanense C.Y.Wu – Yunnan

==== Formerly placed here ====
- Searsia parviflora (Roxb.) F.A.Barkley (as Toxicodendron parviflorum (Roxb.) Kuntze) – Small-flowered poison sumac grows in the Himalayas between Kumaun, India and Bhutan

=== Etymology ===
The generic name is derived from the Greek words τοξικόν (toxikón), meaning 'poison', and δένδρον (déndron), meaning 'tree'.

== Toxicity ==
All members of the genus produce the skin-irritating oil urushiol, which can cause a severe allergic reaction known as urushiol-induced contact dermatitis.

== Uses ==
In East Asia, in particular in Japan, traditional candle fuel was produced from Toxicodendron vernicifluum and Toxicodendron succedaneum, among other sumac plants in the genus Toxicodendron, rather than beeswax or animal fats. The sumac wax was a byproduct of traditional Japanese lacquer manufacture. The conical rousoku candles produced from sumac wax burn with smokeless flame and were favored in many respects over candles made from lard or beeswax during the Tokugawa shogunate. Japan wax is not a true wax but a solid fat that contains 10-15% palmitin, stearin, and olein with about 1% japanic acid (1,21-heneicosanedioic acid). It is still used in many tropical and subtropical countries in the production of wax match sticks.

== Gallery ==
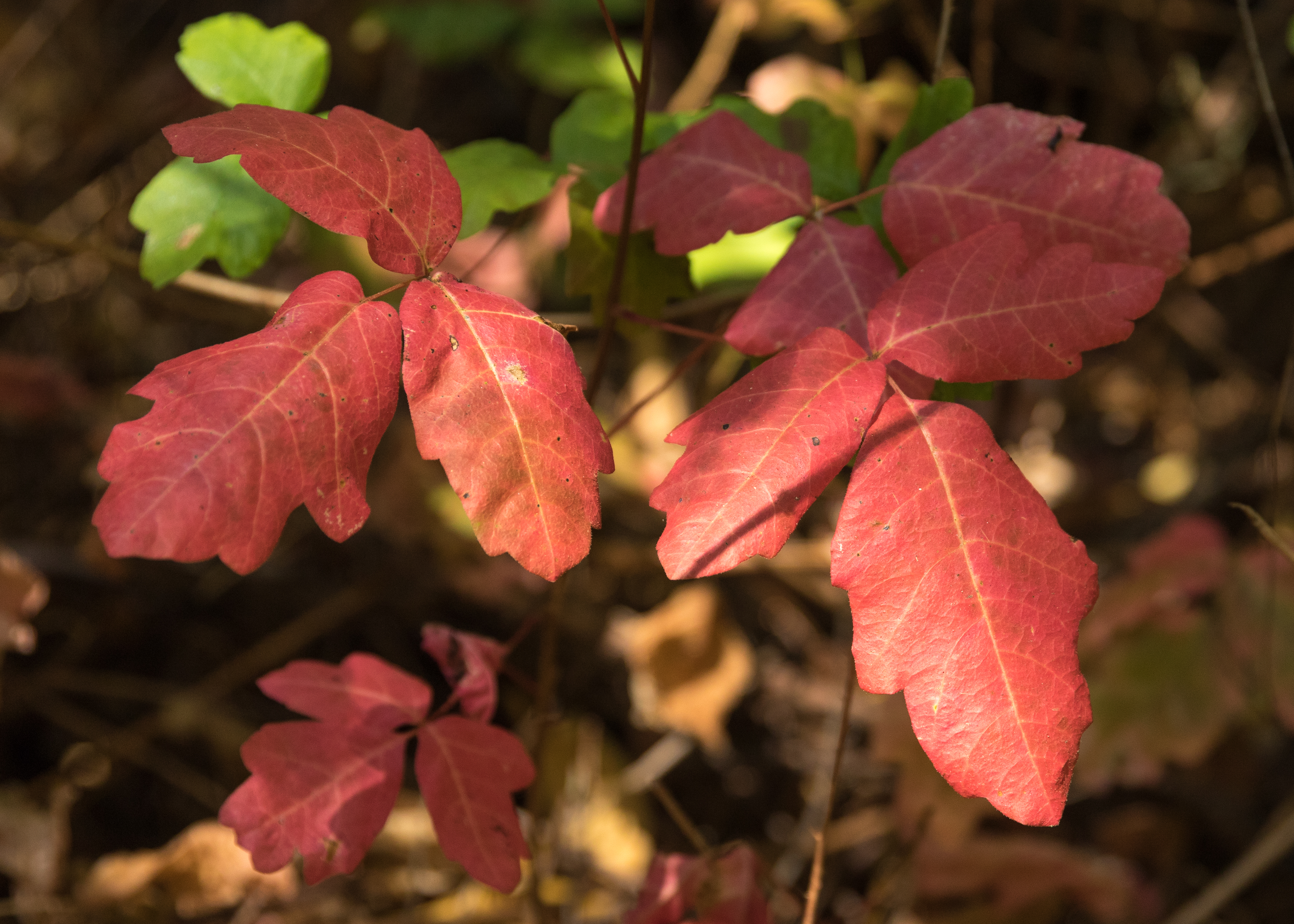
Toxicodendron diversilobum (western poison oak)

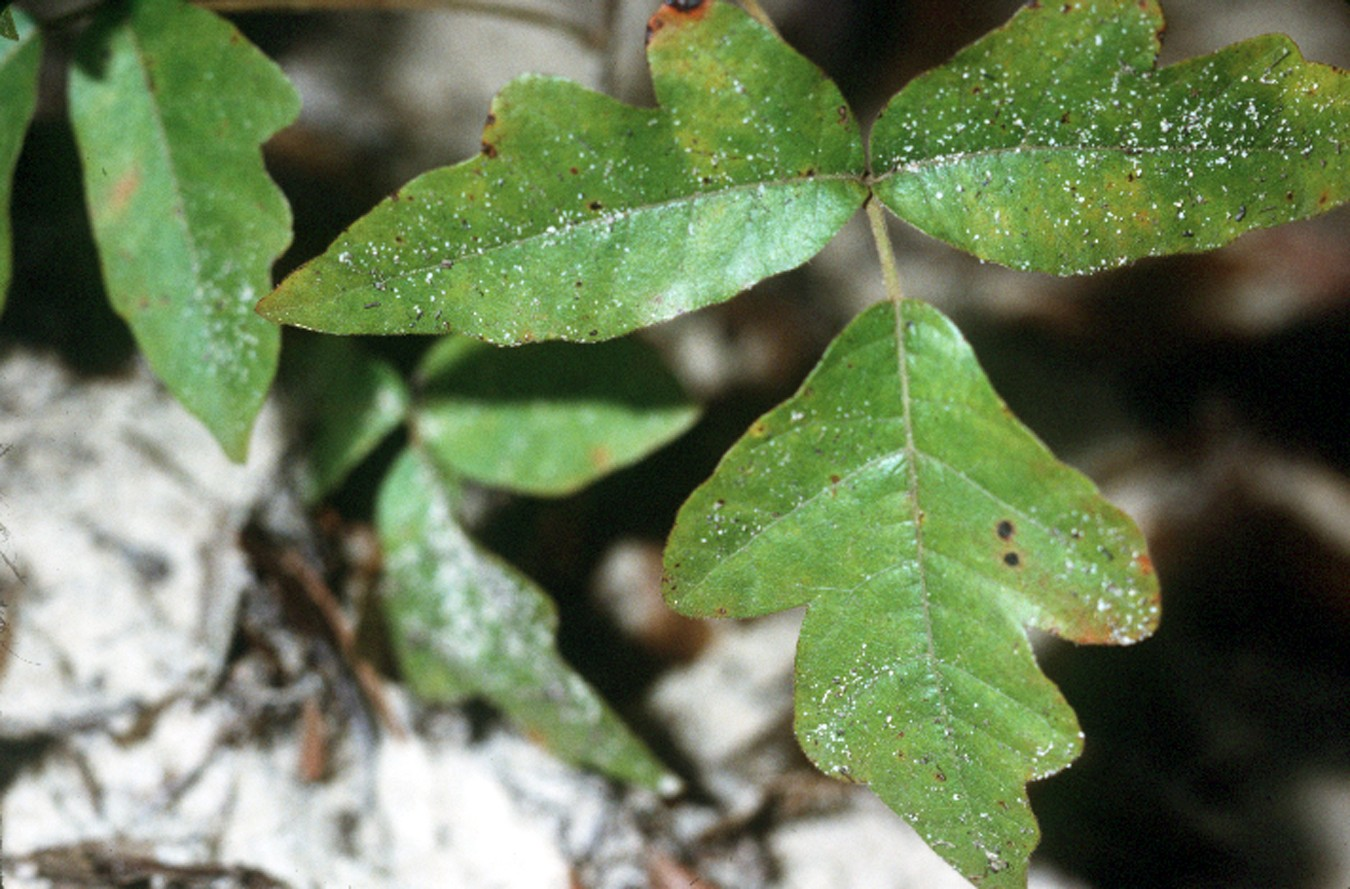
Toxicodendron pubescens (eastern poison oak)

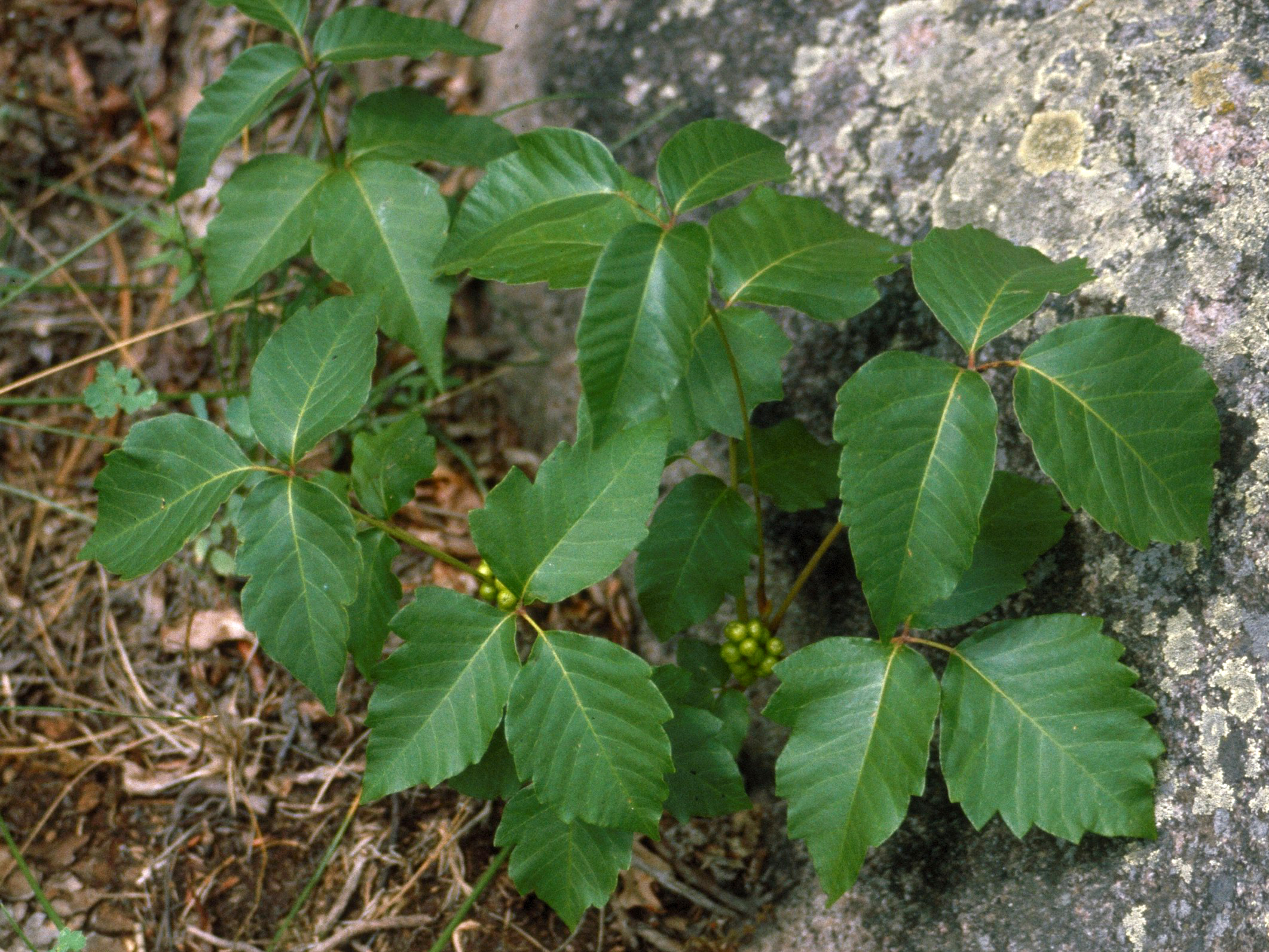
Toxicodendron rydbergii (western poison ivy)

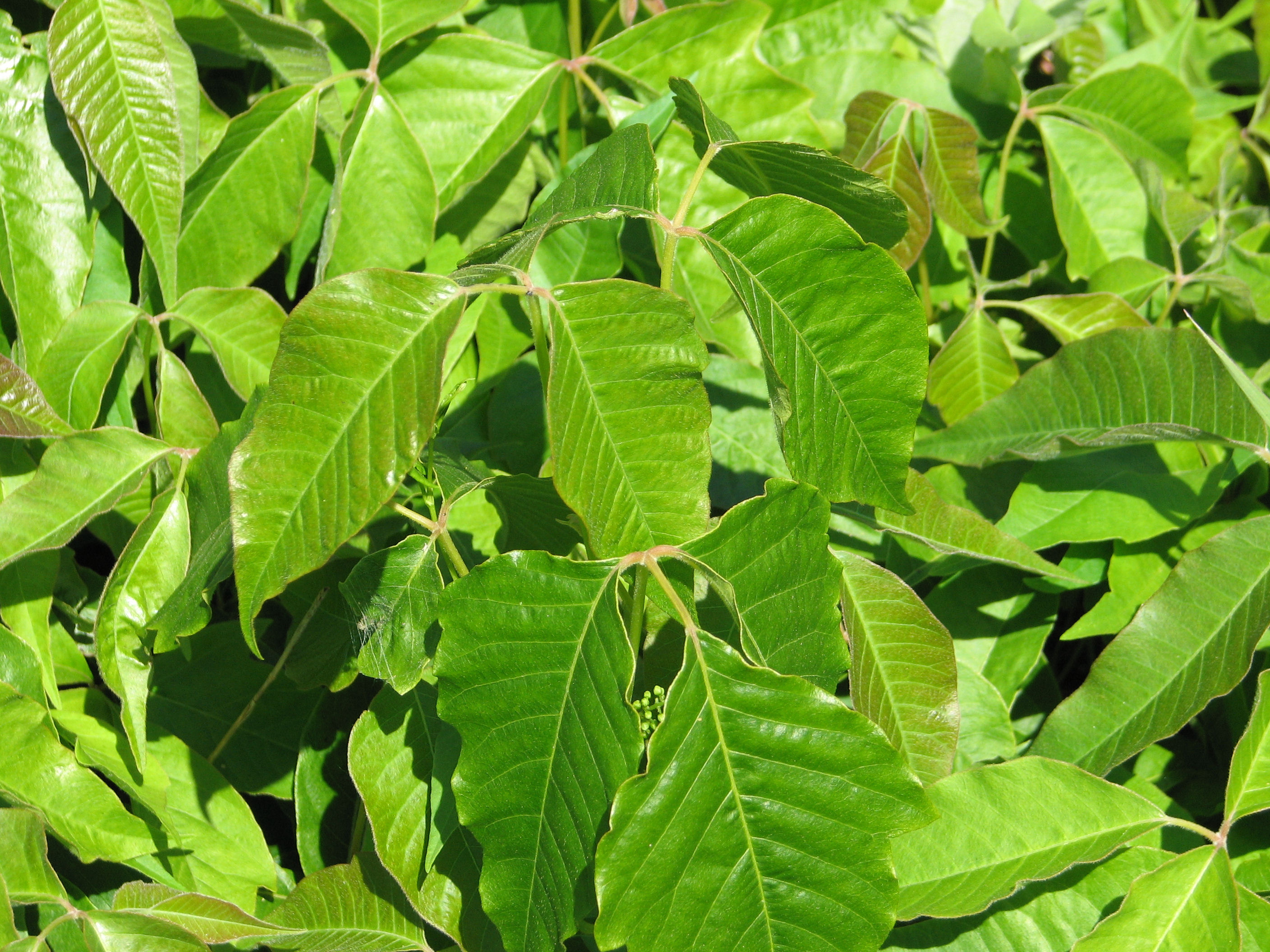
Toxicodendron radicans (eastern poison ivy)
