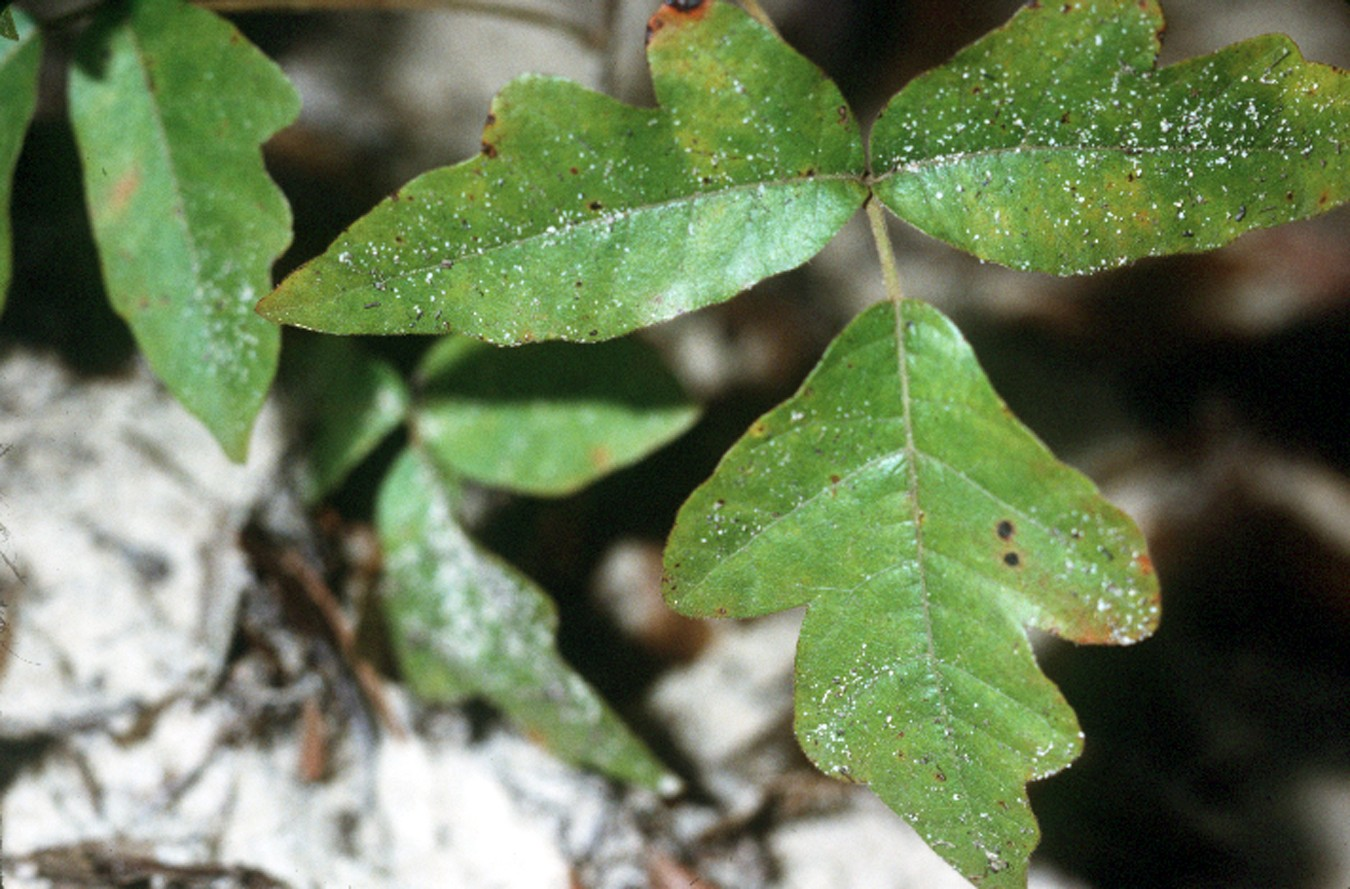

Conservation status
- Secure (NatureServe)

Scientific classification
- Kingdom: Plantae
- Clade: Tracheophytes
- Clade: Angiosperms
- Clade: Eudicots
- Clade: Rosids
- Order: Sapindales
- Family: Anacardiaceae
- Genus: Toxicodendron
- Species: T. pubescens

Binomial name
- Toxicodendron pubescens Mill.

Synonyms
- Rhus pubescens (Mill.) Farw.; Rhus toxicodendron L.

= Toxicodendron pubescens =

Atlantic poison oak

Eastern poison oak

Toxicodendron pubescens (syn. Rhus pubescens), commonly known as Atlantic poison oak or eastern poison oak, is an upright shrub which can cause contact dermatitis for most people.

== Description ==
The shrub grows to 0.6–1.2 metres (2–4 ft) tall. Its leaves are 15 centimetres (6 inches) long, alternate, with three lobes on each. The lobes are usually hairy and are variable in size and shape, but most often resemble white oak leaves; they usually turn yellow or orange in autumn. The yellow flowers bloom from March to April. The fruit is about 1/4 inch (6.4 mm) wide and greenish white.

== Taxonomy ==
It is not closely related to the true oaks in the beech family, instead belonging to the sumac family. Other plants in the Toxicodendron genus, all of which contain dermatitis-inducing urushiol, include poison ivy, poison sumac, Western poison oak, and the lacquer tree.

== Distribution and habitat ==
This species is native to the Southeastern United States from Virginia westward to Texas and Oklahoma.

Atlantic poison oak can be found growing in forests, thickets, and dry, sandy fields.

== Toxicity ==
All parts of this plant contain urushiol, which can cause severe dermatitis in sensitive individuals. The risk of exposure may be reduced by learning to recognize and avoid this species and wearing clothing that covers the legs and arms. Contaminated clothing should be laundered before subsequent handling or use.

Effects of poison oak are similar to those of its close relative poison ivy. It causes severe itching, inflammation, and blistering.
