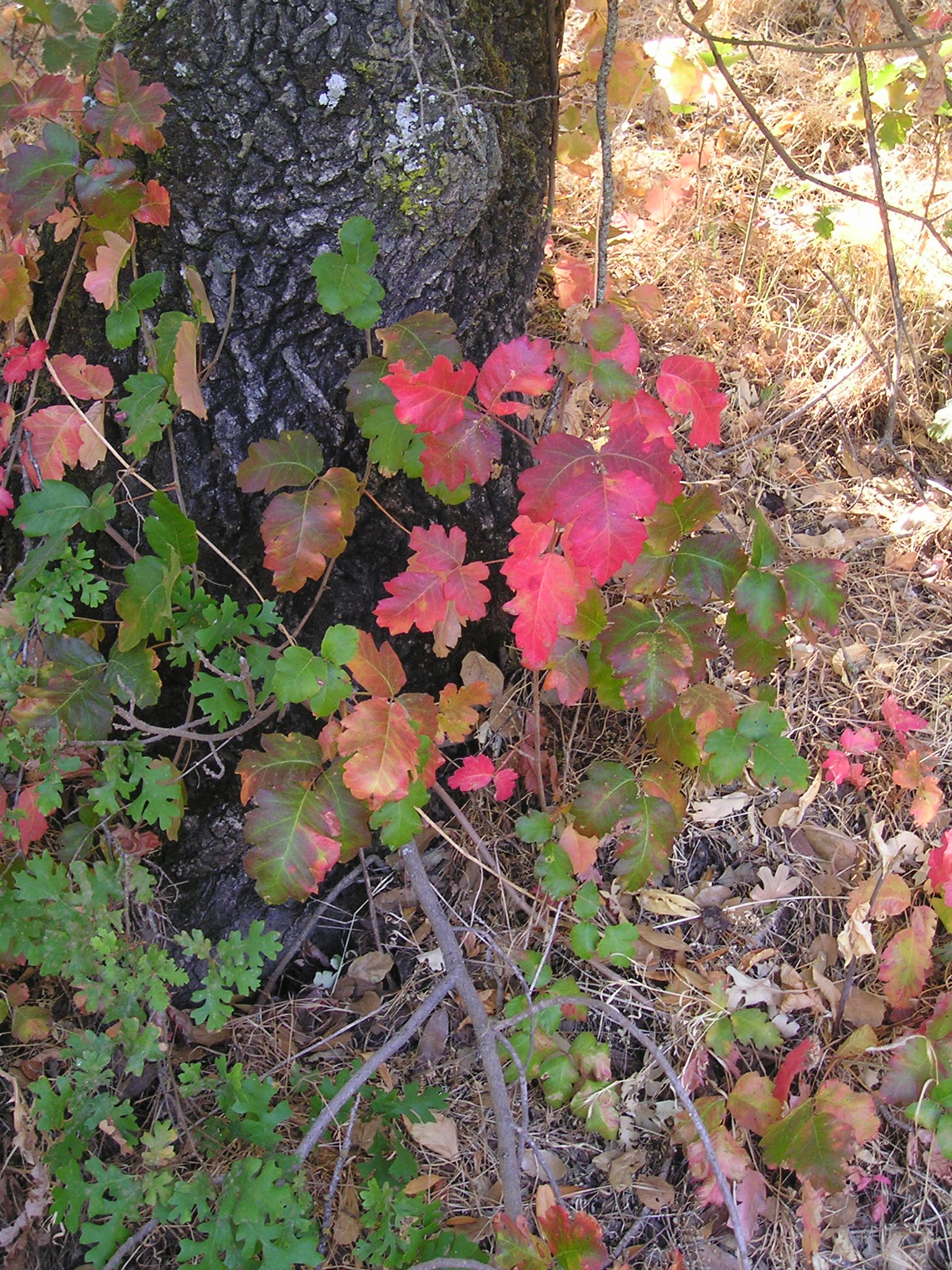
- Pacific poison oak (larger and reddish leaves) at the base of an oak tree

Conservation status
- Secure (NatureServe)

Scientific classification
- Kingdom: Plantae
- Clade: Tracheophytes
- Clade: Angiosperms
- Clade: Eudicots
- Clade: Rosids
- Order: Sapindales
- Family: Anacardiaceae
- Genus: Toxicodendron
- Species: T. diversilobum

Binomial name
- Toxicodendron diversilobum (Torr. & A.Gray) Greene

Synonyms
- Rhus diversiloba Torr. & A.Gray

= Toxicodendron diversilobum =

Toxicodendron diversilobum Pacific poison oak

Species of plant

Toxicodendron diversilobum (syn. Rhus diversiloba), commonly named Pacific poison oak or western poison oak, is a woody vine or shrub in the sumac family, Anacardiaceae.

It is widely distributed in western North America, inhabiting conifer and mixed broadleaf forests, woodlands, grasslands, and chaparral biomes. Peak flowering occurs in May. Like other members of the genus Toxicodendron, T. diversilobum causes itching and allergic rashes in most people after contact by touch or smoke inhalation. Despite its name, it is not closely related to oaks, nor is it a true tree.

== Description ==
Toxicodendron diversilobum is extremely variable in growth habit and leaf appearance. It grows as a dense 0.5–4 metres (1 1/2–13 feet) tall shrub in open sunlight, a treelike vine 3–9 m (10–30 ft) and may be more than 30 m (100 ft) long with an 8–20 centimetres (3 1/4–7 3/4 inches) trunk, as dense thickets in shaded areas, or any form in between. It reproduces by spreading rhizomes and by seeds.

The plant is winter deciduous, so that after cold weather sets in, the stems are leafless and bear only the occasional cluster of mature fruit. Without leaves the stems may sometimes be identified by occasional black marks where its milky sap may have oozed and dried.

The leaves are divided into three (rarely 5, 7, or 9) leaflets, 3.5 to 10 cm (1 1/2 to 4 in) long, with scalloped, toothed, or lobed edges. They generally resemble the lobed leaves of a true oak, though tend to be more glossy. Leaves are typically bronze when first unfolding in February to March, bright green in the spring, yellow-green to reddish in the summer, and bright red or pink from late July to October.

White flowers form in the spring, from March to June. If they are fertilized, they develop into greenish-white or tan drupes.

Botanist John Howell observed that the plant's toxicity obscures its aesthetic values:

In spring, the ivory flowers bloom on the sunny hill or in sheltered glade, in summer its fine green leaves contrast refreshingly with dried and tawny grassland, in autumn its colors flame more brilliantly than in any other native, but one great fault, its poisonous juice, nullifies its every other virtue and renders this beautiful shrub the most disparaged of all within our region.

Shrubby, thicket-forming habit

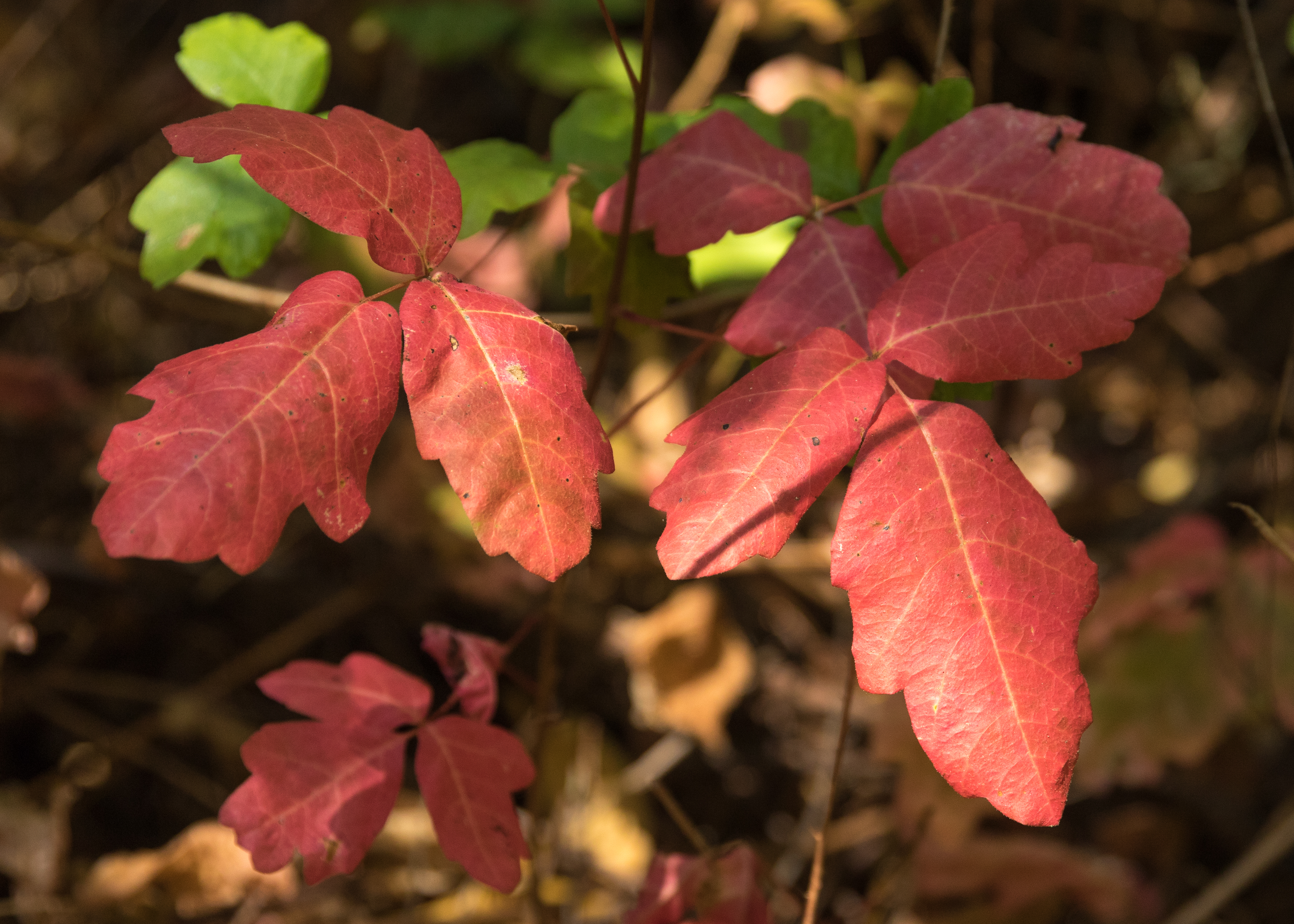
T. diversilobum foliage at Samuel P. Taylor State Park, California

Vine form growing on a Coast redwood

== Distribution and habitat ==
T. diversilobum turning red in mixed woodland at Wildcat Canyon Regional Park

Toxicodendron diversilobum is found in California (Los Angeles was built on the site of a village named Yaangna or iyáanga’, meaning "poison oak place"), the Baja California Peninsula, Nevada, Oregon, Washington, and British Columbia. The related T. pubescens (eastern poison oak) is native to the Southeastern United States. T. diversilobum and T. rydbergii (western poison ivy) hybridize in the Columbia River Gorge area.

Toxicodendron diversilobum is common in various habitats, from mesic riparian zones to xeric chaparral. It thrives in shady and dappled light through full and direct sunlight conditions, at elevations below 1,500 m (5,000 ft). The vining form can climb up large shrub and tree trunks into their canopies. Sometimes it kills the support plant by smothering or breaking it. The plant often occurs in chaparral and woodlands, coastal sage scrub, grasslands, and oak woodlands; and Douglas-fir (Pseudotsuga menzesii), hemlock–Sitka spruce, Sequoia sempervirens (coast redwood), Pinus ponderosa (Ponderosa pine), and mixed evergreen forests.

== Ecology ==
Black-tailed deer, mule deer, California ground squirrels, western gray squirrels, and other indigenous fauna feed on the leaves of the plant. It is rich in phosphorus, calcium, and sulfur. Bird species use the berries for food, and utilize the plant structure for shelter. Neither native animals nor horses, livestock, or dogs demonstrate reactions to urushiol.

Due to human allergic reactions, T. diversilobum is usually eradicated from gardens and public landscaped areas. It can be a weed in agricultural fields, orchards, and vineyards. It is usually removed by pruning, herbicides, digging out, or a combination. Poison oak is susceptible to infection by Phytophthora ramorum.

== Toxicity ==
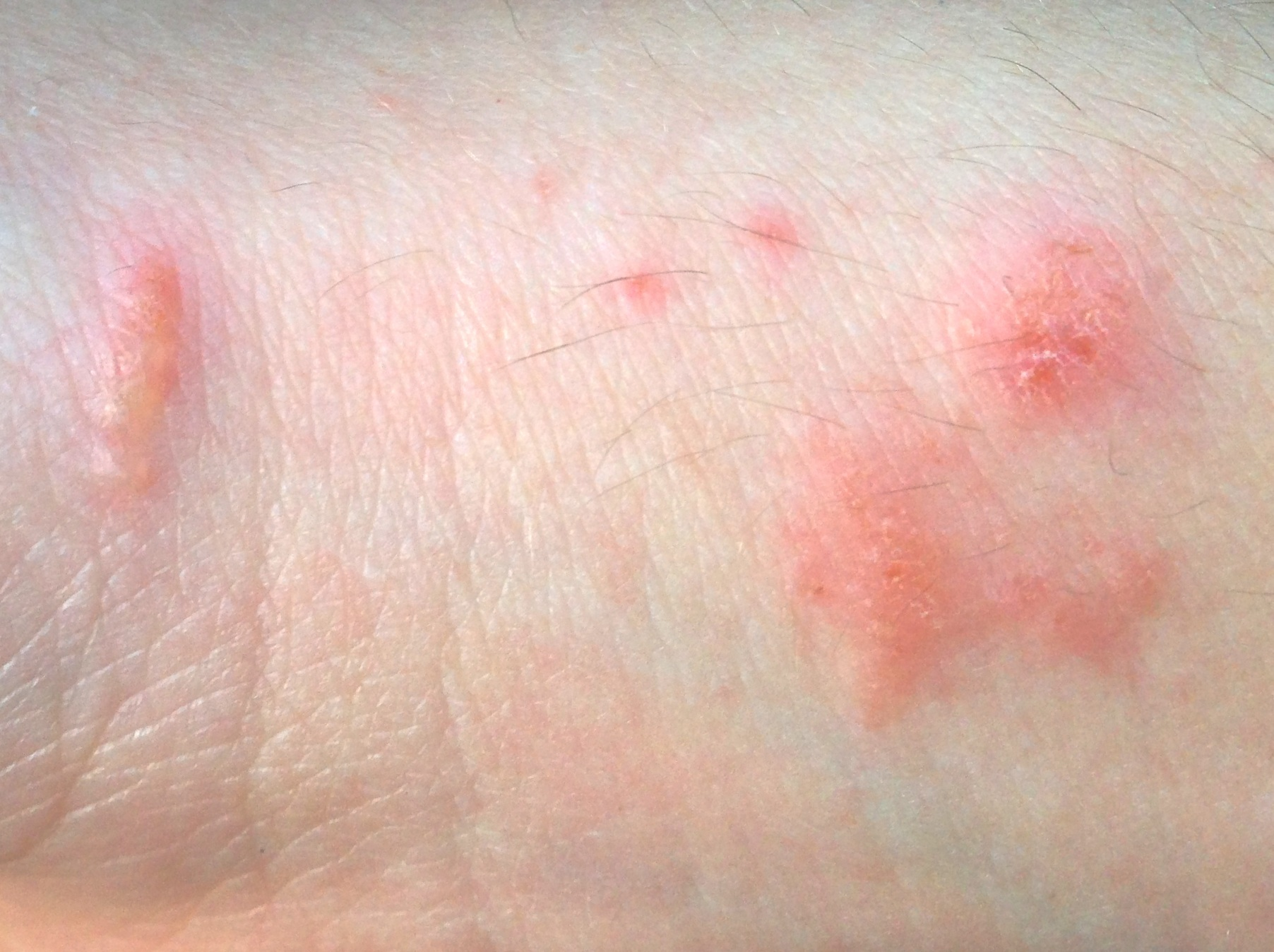
Urushiol-induced contact dermatitis from poison oak

Toxicodendron diversilobum leaves and twigs have a surface oil, urushiol, which causes an allergic reaction. It causes contact dermatitis – an immune-mediated skin inflammation – in four-fifths of humans. Most, if not all, will become sensitized over time with repeated or more concentrated exposure to urushiol.

The active components of urushiol have been determined to be unsaturated congeners of 3-heptadecylcatechol with up to three double bonds in an unbranched C17 side chain. In poison ivy, these components are unique in that they contain a -CH2CH2- group in an unbranched alkyl side chain.

=== Exposure ===
Toxicodendron diversilobum skin contact first causes itching; then evolves into dermatitis with inflammation, colorless bumps, severe itching, and blistering. In the dormant deciduous seasons the plant can be difficult to recognize; however, contact with leafless branches and twigs also causes allergic reactions.

Urushiol volatilizes when burned, and human exposure to T. diversilobum smoke is extremely hazardous, from wildfires, controlled burns, or disposal fires. The smoke can poison people who thought they were immune. Branches used to toast food over campfires can cause reactions internally and externally.

Urushiol exposure can sensitize people to an allergic reaction to the skin of mangos. This cross-reactivity is thought to be caused by 5-resorcinol in the mango skin.

== Uses ==
=== Medicinal ===
Californian Native Americans used the plant's stems and shoots to make baskets, the sap to cure ringworm, and as a poultice of fresh leaves applied to rattlesnake bites. The juice or soot was used as a black dye for sedge basket elements, tattoos, and skin darkening.

An infusion of dried roots, or buds eaten in the spring, were taken by some native peoples for an immunity from the plant poisons.

Chumash peoples used T. diversilobum sap to remove warts, corns, and calluses; to cauterize sores; and to stop bleeding. They drank a decoction made from the roots to treat dysentery.

=== Cultivation ===
Toxicodendron diversilobum can be a carefully situated component in wildlife gardens, habitat gardens, and natural landscaping.

The plant is used in habitat restoration projects. It can be early stage succession where woodlands have been burned or removed, serving as a nurse plant for other species.

== Gallery ==
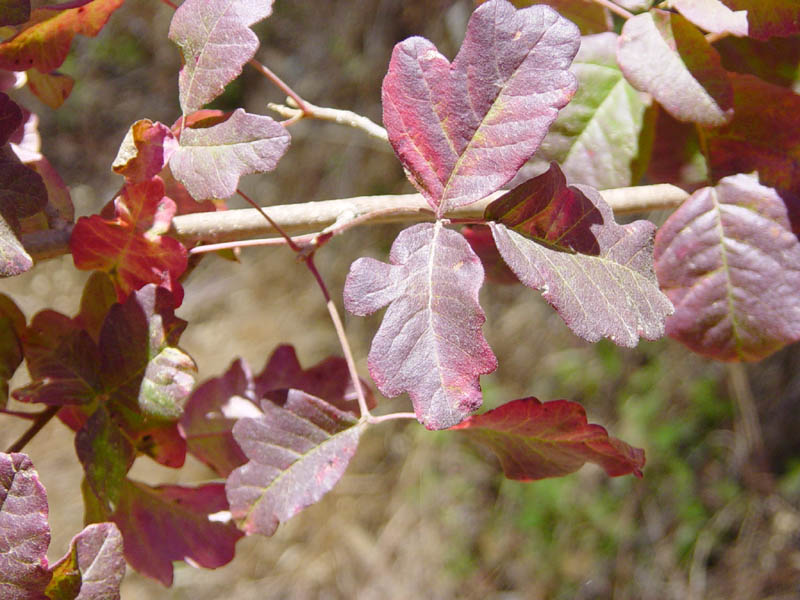
Red phase in spring

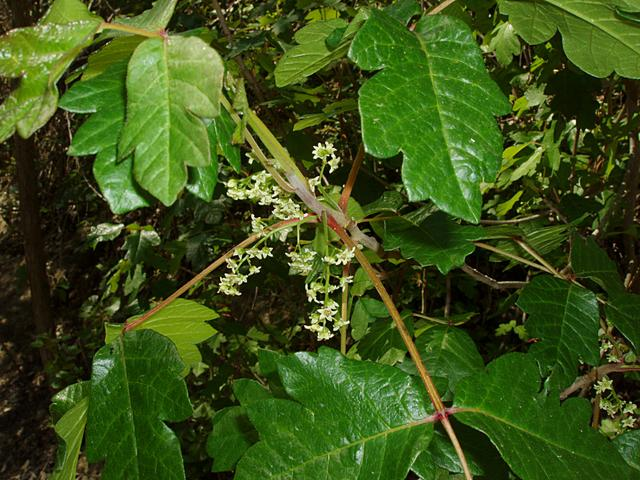
Green phase, and flowers

Drupes

== See also ==
- Toxicodendron vernix – poison sumac
- Toxicodendron radicans – eastern poison ivy
