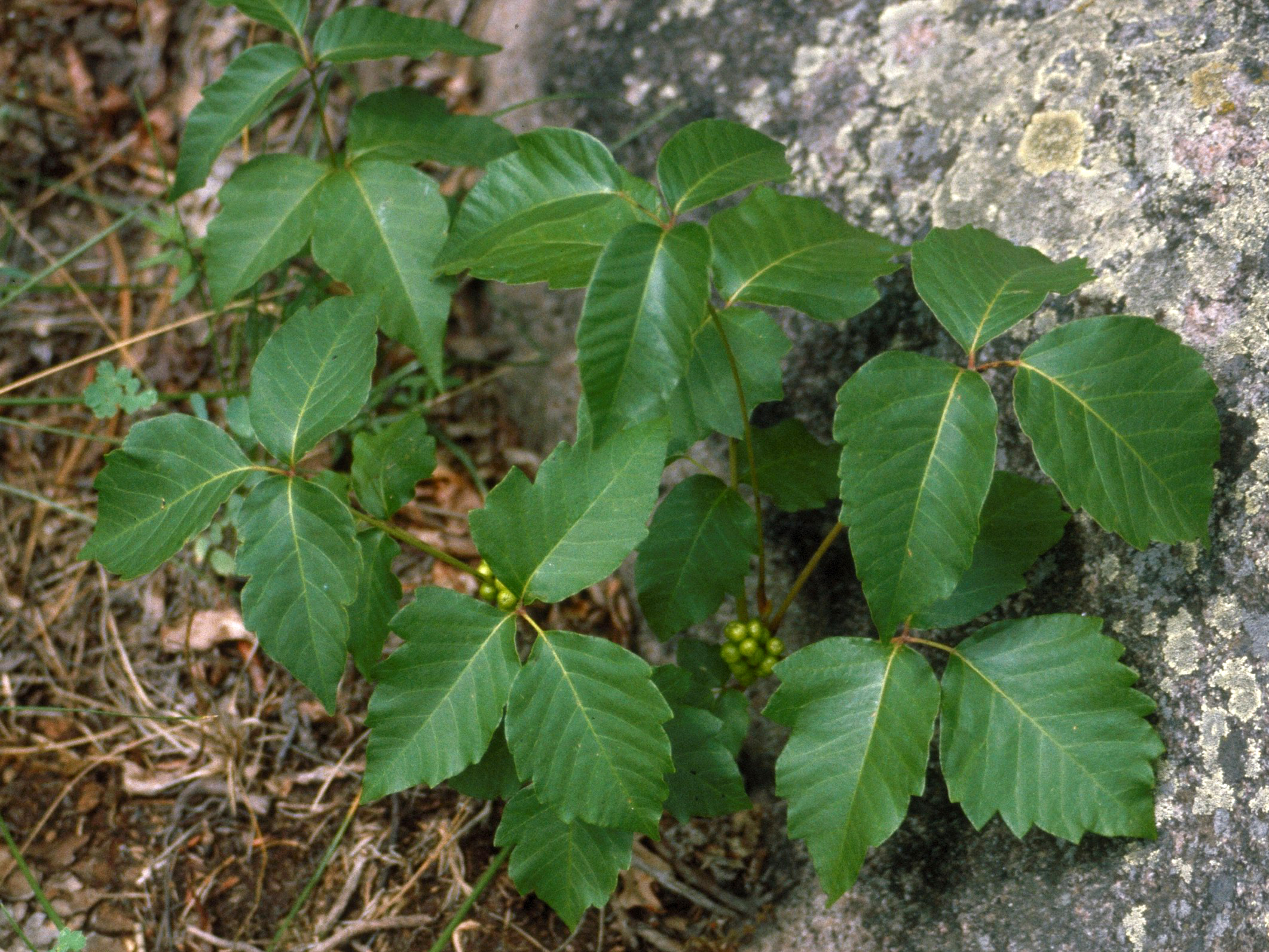

Conservation status
- Secure (NatureServe)

Scientific classification
- Kingdom: Plantae
- Clade: Tracheophytes
- Clade: Angiosperms
- Clade: Eudicots
- Clade: Rosids
- Order: Sapindales
- Family: Anacardiaceae
- Genus: Toxicodendron
- Species: T. rydbergii

Binomial name
- Toxicodendron rydbergii (Small ex Rydb.) Greene

Synonyms
- Rhus rydbergii Small ex Rydb.; Rhus radicans var. rydbergii (Small ex Rydb.) Rehder; Rhus toxicodendron var. rydbergii (Small ex Rydb.) Garrett; Toxicodendron radicans subsp. rydbergii (Small ex Rydb.) Á. Löve & D. Löve; Toxicodendron radicans var. rydbergii (Small ex Rydb.) Erskine

= Toxicodendron rydbergii =

Species of plant

Toxicodendron rydbergii, the western poison ivy, is a species of Toxicodendron in the cashew family native to North America. As a poison ivy, it can cause urushiol-induced contact dermatitis.

== Description ==
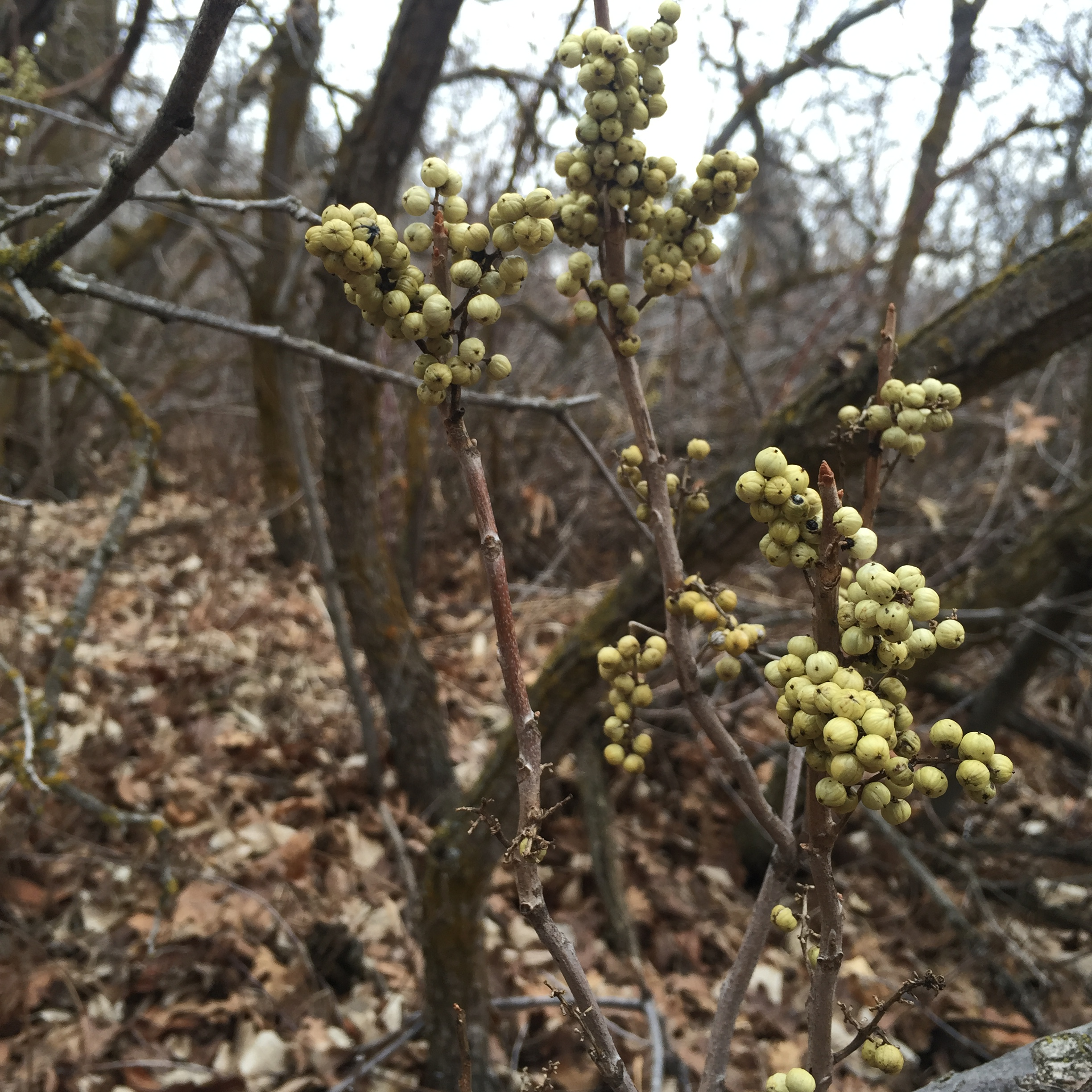
Berries in winter, Wasatch Range

Unlike Toxicodendron radicans (eastern poison ivy), which often appears as a trailing or climbing vine, T. rydbergii is a shrub that can grow to 1 m (3 ft) tall, rarely up to 3 m (10 ft).

The leaves are trifoliate and alternate. The leaflets are variable in size and shape, and are usually 15 cm (6 in) long, turning yellow or orange in autumn. On the compound trifoliate leaves, the two leaflets opposite each other are typically asymmetrical, in contrast to the terminal leaflet which always shows bilateral symmetry.

The fruits are small, round, and yellowish. Like other members of its genus, all parts of this plant contain urushiol, the substance that causes an itchy rash in most people.

== Distribution and habitat ==
It is native to most of Canada from the Maritimes to British Columbia, and most of the contiguous United States except the Southeast, Nevada, Oregon and California. It is apparently extirpated from West Virginia. It can be found growing in forests, and other wooded areas, usually near streams and rivers.

== Toxicity ==
Because it contains urushiol, contact with the plant can cause severe contact dermatitis in most individuals.
