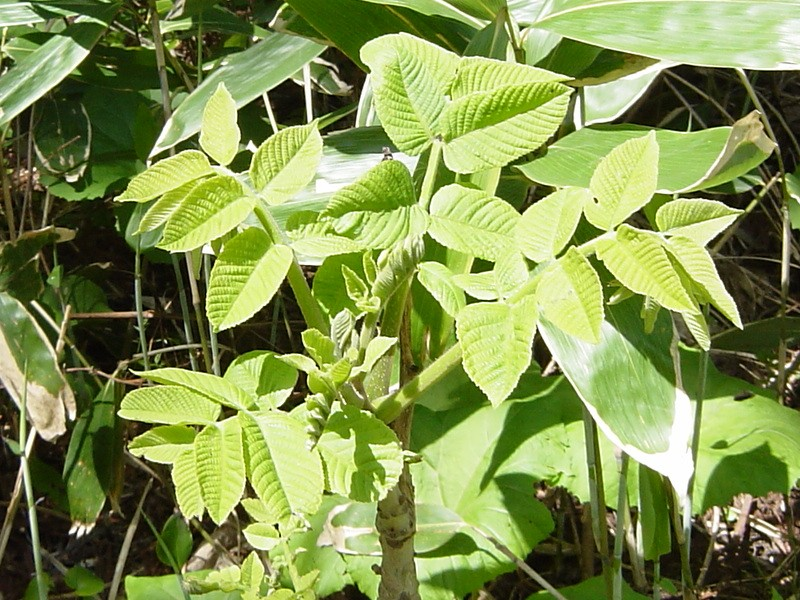

Scientific classification
- Kingdom: Plantae
- Clade: Embryophytes
- Clade: Tracheophytes
- Clade: Spermatophytes
- Clade: Angiosperms
- Clade: Eudicots
- Clade: Rosids
- Order: Sapindales
- Family: Anacardiaceae
- Genus: Toxicodendron
- Species: T. vernicifluum

Binomial name
- Toxicodendron vernicifluum (Stokes) F. A. Barkley

= Toxicodendron vernicifluum =

Species of plant

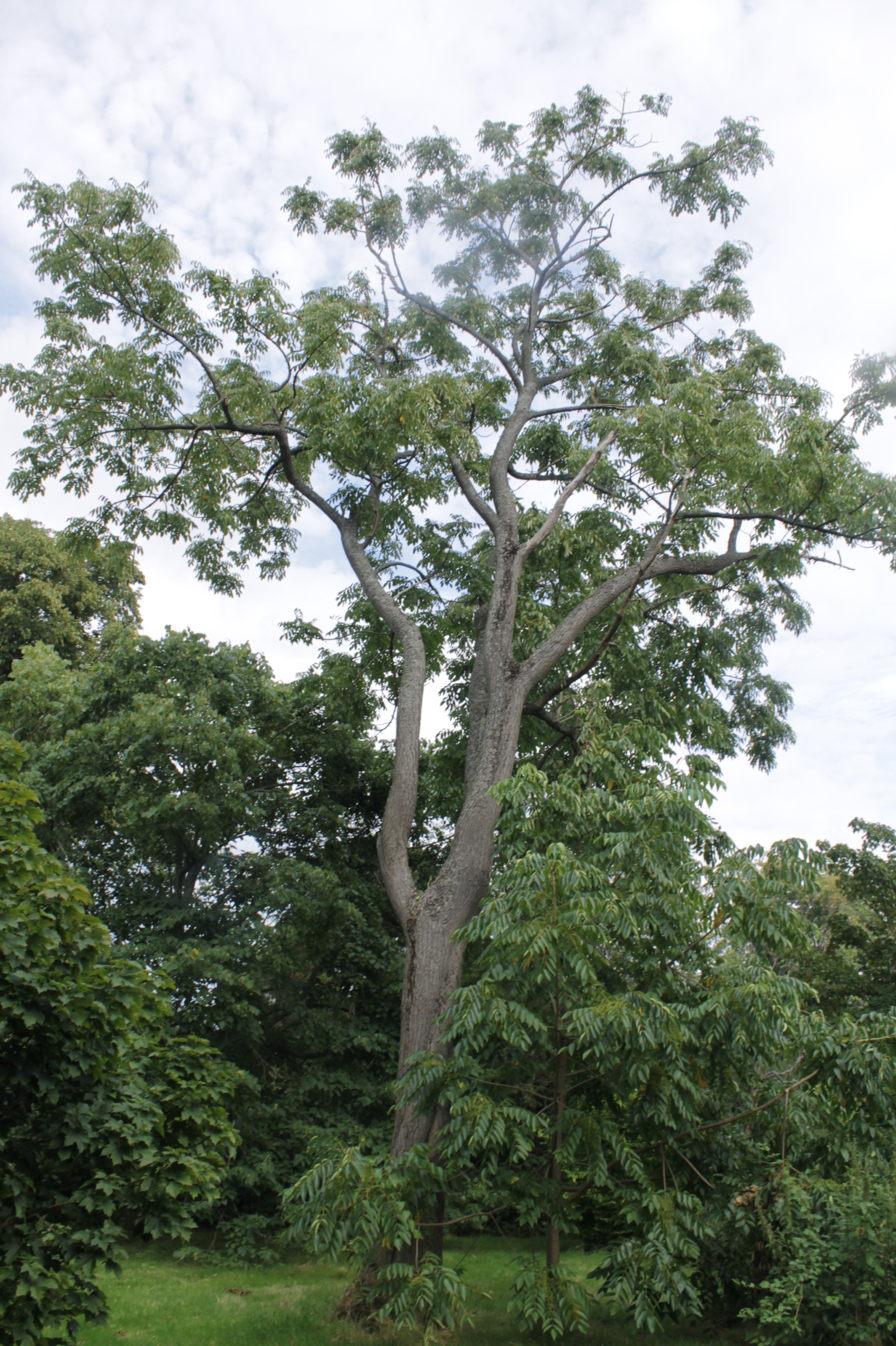
Mature Toxicodendron vernicifluum, Royal Botanic Garden, Edinburgh

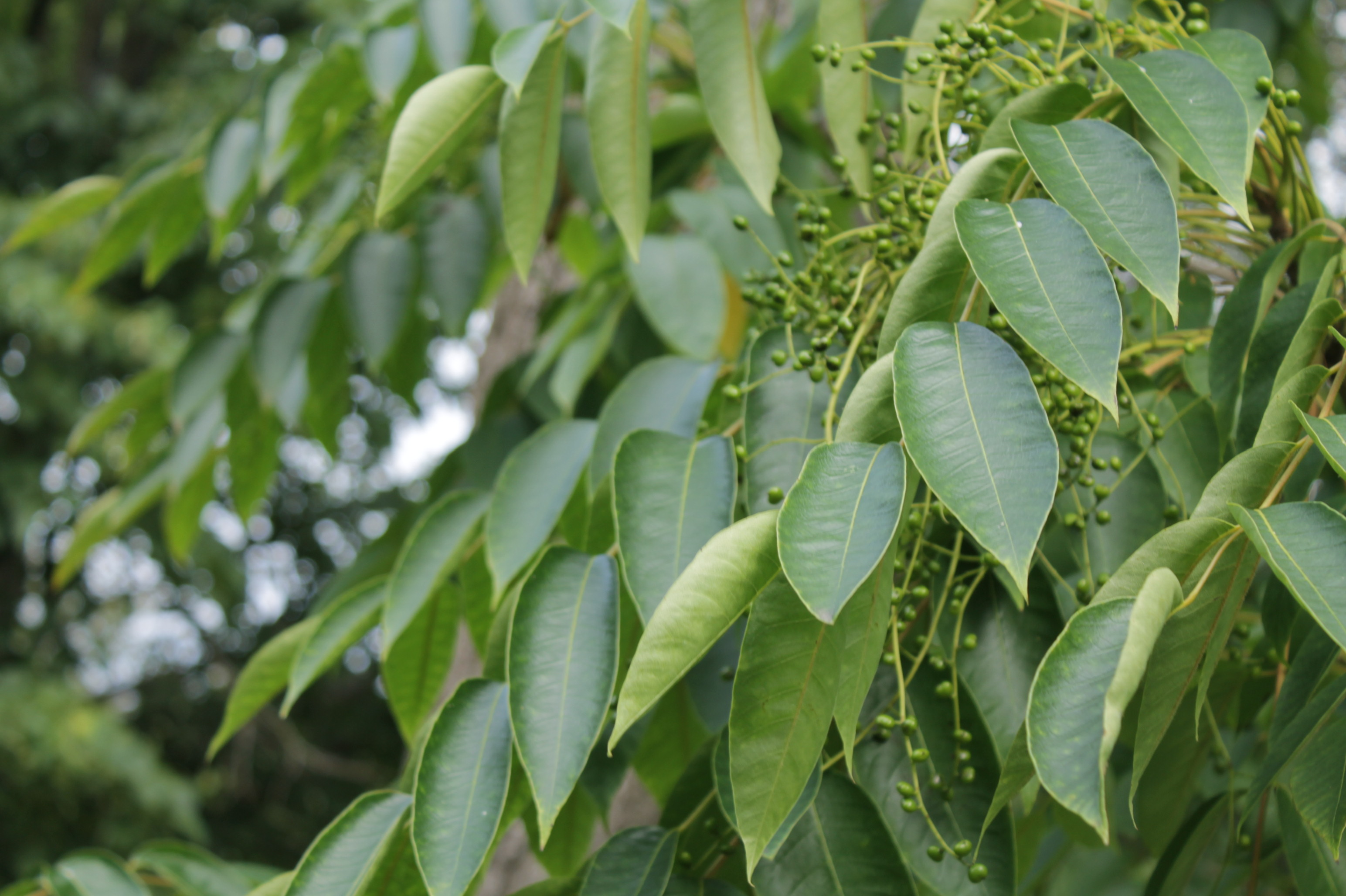
Leaves and immature fruit on a mature Toxicodendron vernicifluum, Edinburgh

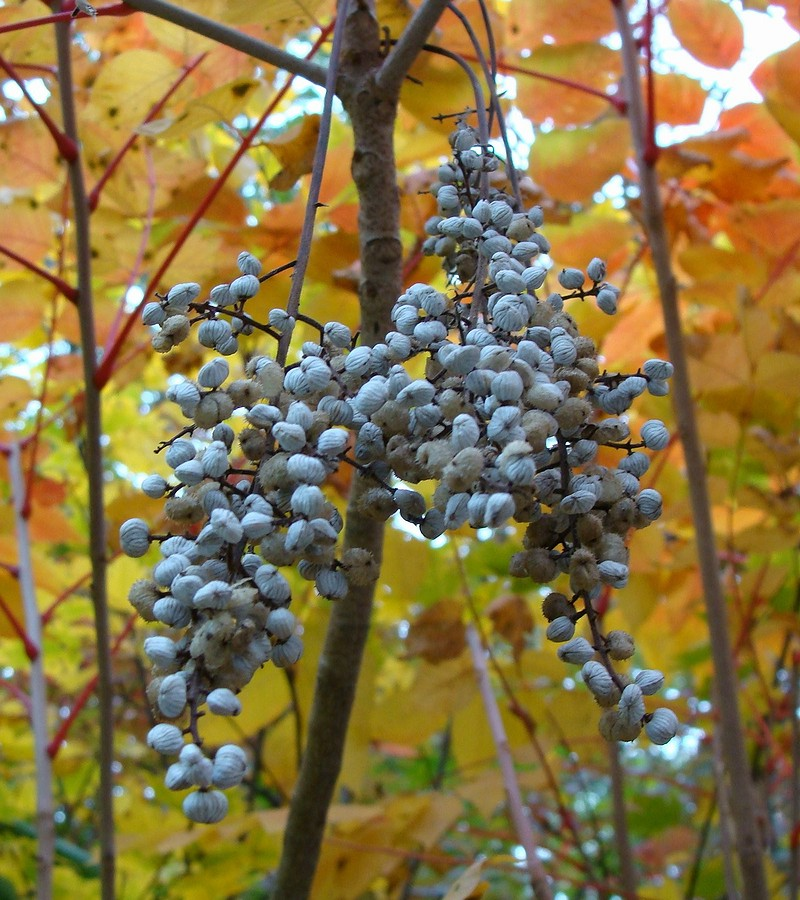
Fruits of T. vernicifluum

Toxicodendron vernicifluum (formerly Rhus verniciflua), also known by the common name Chinese lacquer tree, is an Asian tree species of genus Toxicodendron native to China and the Indian subcontinent, and cultivated in regions of China, Japan and Korea. Other common names include poison sumac, Japanese lacquer tree, Japanese sumac, and varnish tree. The trees are cultivated and tapped for their toxic sap, which is used as a highly durable lacquer to make Chinese, Japanese, and Korean lacquerware.

The trees grow up to 20 metres tall with large leaves, each containing from 7 to 19 leaflets (most often 11–13). The sap contains the allergenic compound urushiol, which gets its name from this species' Japanese name urushi (urushi (漆)); "urushi" is also used in English as a collective term for all kinds of Asian lacquerware made from the sap of this and related Asian tree species, as opposed to European "lacquer" or Japanning made from other materials. Urushiol is also the oil found in poison ivy and poison oak, to which the tree is related, that causes a rash.

== Uses ==
=== Lacquer ===
Sap, containing urushiol (an allergenic irritant), is tapped from the trunk of the Chinese lacquer tree to produce lacquer. This is done by cutting 5 to 10 horizontal lines on the trunk of a 10-year-old tree, and then collecting the greyish yellow sap that exudes. The sap is then filtered, heat-treated, or coloured before applying onto a base material that is to be lacquered. Curing the applied sap requires "drying" it in a warm, humid chamber or closet for 12 to 24 hours where the urushiol polymerizes to form a clear, hard, and waterproof surface. In its liquid state, urushiol can cause extreme rashes, even from vapours. Once hardened, reactions are possible but less common.

Products coated with lacquer are recognizable by an extremely durable and glossy finish. Lacquer has many uses; some common applications include tableware, musical instruments, fountain pens, jewelry, and bows for archery. There are various types of lacquerware. The cinnabar-red is highly regarded. Unpigmented lacquer is dark brown but the most common colors of urushiol finishes are black and red, from powdered iron oxide pigments of ferrous-ferric oxide (magnetite) and ferric oxide (rust), respectively. Lacquer is painted on with a brush and is cured in a warm and humid environment.

The leaves, seeds, and the resin of the Chinese lacquer tree are sometimes used in Chinese medicine for the treatment of internal parasites and for stopping bleeding. Compounds butein and sulfuretin are antioxidants, and have inhibitory effects on aldose reductase and advanced glycation processes.

Buddhist monks who practiced Sokushinbutsu would use the tree's sap in their ceremony.

=== Wax ===
The fruits of T. vernicifluum can also be processed to produce a waxy substance known as Japan wax used for numerous purposes including varnishing furniture and producing candles. The fruits of the trees are harvested, dried, steamed, and pressed to extract the wax, which hardens when cooled.

== See also ==
- Lacquer
- Lacquerware
- Shimose powder
- Urushi-e
- Urushiol
