= Toxicodendron delavayi =

Conservation status
- Conservation Dependent (IUCN 2.3)

Scientific classification
- Kingdom: Plantae
- Clade: Tracheophytes
- Clade: Angiosperms
- Clade: Eudicots
- Clade: Rosids
- Order: Sapindales
- Family: Anacardiaceae
- Genus: Toxicodendron
- Species: T. delavayi

Binomial name
- Toxicodendron delavayi (Franch.) F.A.Barkley

Synonyms
- Rhus delavayi Franch.

Species of flowering plant

Toxicodendron delavayi is a species of plant in the family Anacardiaceae. It is endemic to China. It is threatened by habitat loss.
