= Poison oak =

Poison oak refers to two plant species in the genus Toxicodendron, both of which can cause skin irritation:

- Toxicodendron diversilobum or Pacific poison oak, found in western North America
- Toxicodendron pubescens or Atlantic poison oak, found in southeastern North America
