= Urushiol-induced contact dermatitis =

Skin condition caused by plants such as poison ivy

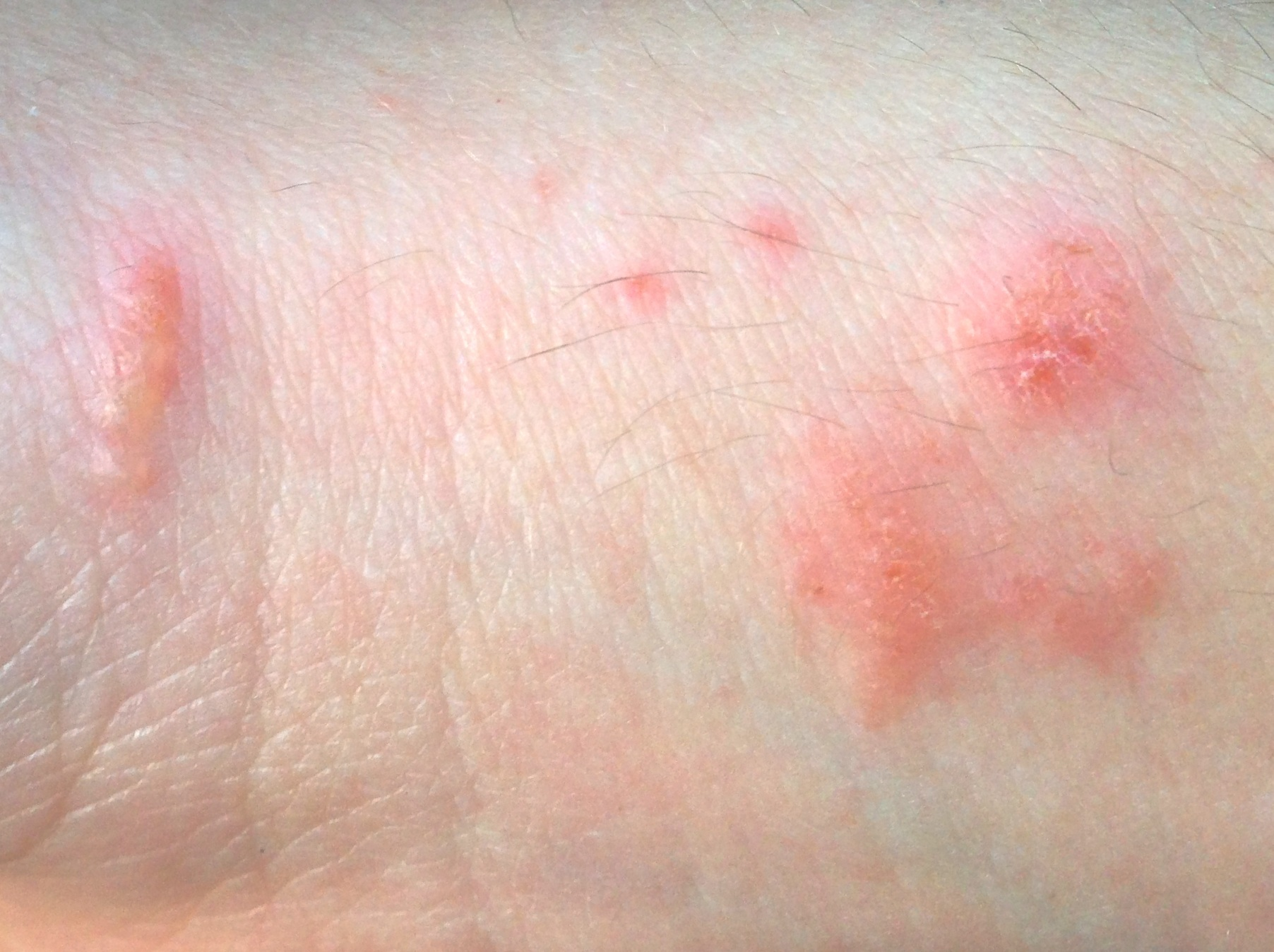
- Specialty: Dermatology
- Symptoms: Rashes, itching, inflammation, oozing, and, in severe cases, a burning sensation.
- Causes: Urushiol contact

Urushiol-induced contact dermatitis (also called Toxicodendron dermatitis or Rhus dermatitis) is a type of allergic contact dermatitis caused by the oil urushiol, which is found in various plants, most notably sumac family species of the genus Toxicodendron: poison ivy, poison oak, poison sumac, and the Chinese lacquer tree. The name 'urushiol' is derived from the Japanese word for the sap of the Chinese lacquer tree, urushi. Other plants in the sumac family (including mango, pistachio, the Burmese lacquer tree, the India marking nut tree, and the cashew) also contain urushiol, as do unrelated plants such as Ginkgo biloba.

As with all contact dermatitis, urushiol-induced allergic rashes are a Type IV hypersensitivity reaction, also known as delayed-type hypersensitivity. Symptoms include itching, inflammation, oozing, and, in severe cases, a burning sensation. Additionally, smoke from burning plant matter may be toxic.

The American Academy of Dermatology estimates that there are up to 50 million cases of urushiol-induced dermatitis annually in the United States alone, accounting for 10% of all lost-time injuries in the U.S. Forest Service. Poison oak is a significant problem in the rural Western and Southern U.S., while poison ivy is most rampant in the Eastern U.S. Dermatitis from poison sumac is less common.

== Signs and symptoms ==
Urushiol causes an eczematous contact dermatitis characterized by redness, swelling, papules, vesicles, blisters, and streaking. People vary greatly in their sensitivity to urushiol. In approximately 15% to 30% of people, urushiol does not trigger an immune system response, while at least 25% of people have a very strong immune response resulting in severe symptoms.

The rash takes one to two weeks to run its course and may cause scars, depending on the severity of the exposure. Severe cases involve small (1–2 mm), clear, fluid-filled blisters on the skin. Pus-filled vesicles containing a whitish fluid may indicate an infection. Most poison ivy rashes, without infections, will resolve within 14 days without treatment. Excessive scratching may result in infection, commonly by staphylococcal and streptococcal species; these may require antibiotics.

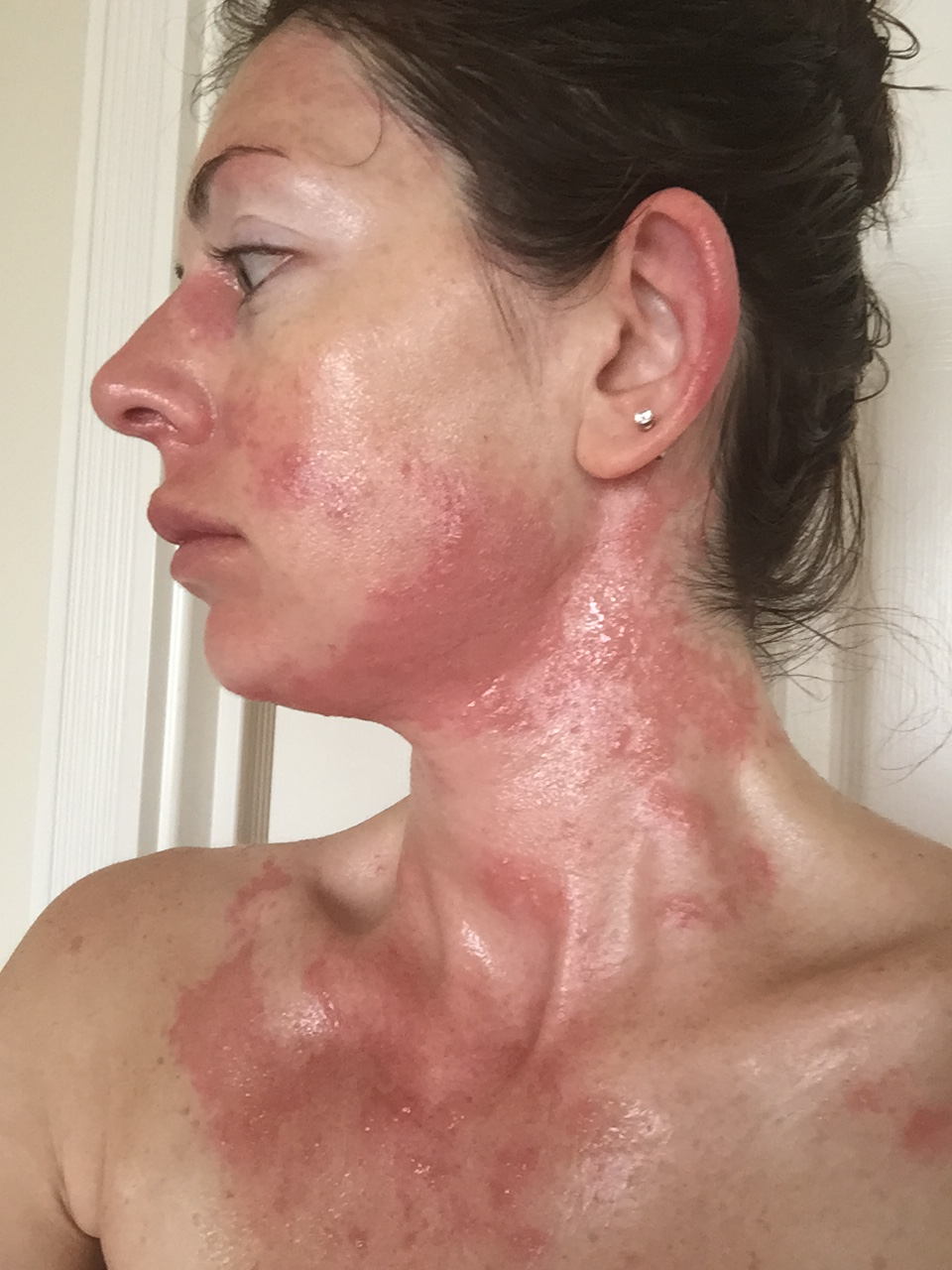
Severe allergic reaction to urushiol (poison oak) 4 days after exposure

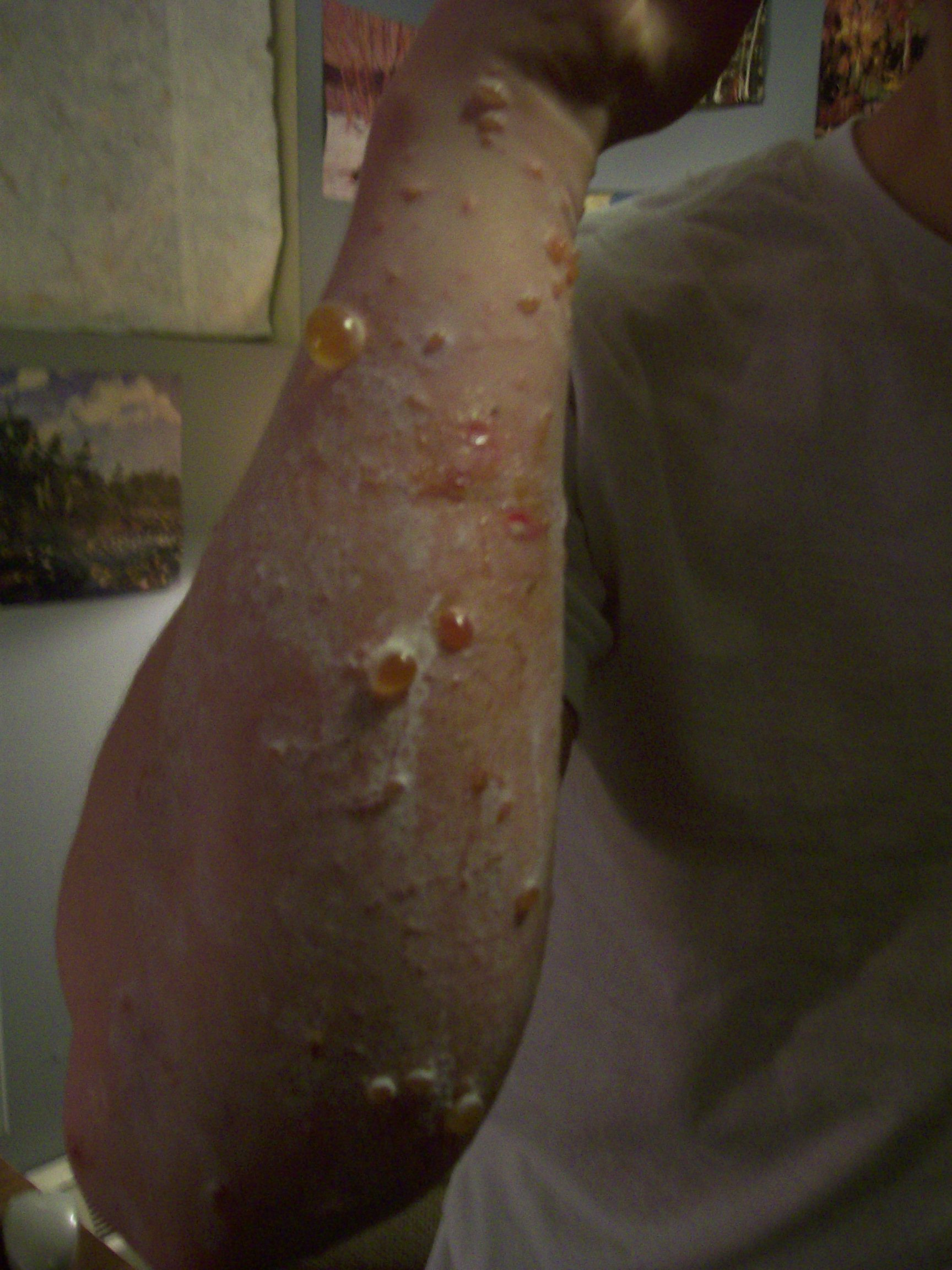
Blistering 48 hours after urushiol contact

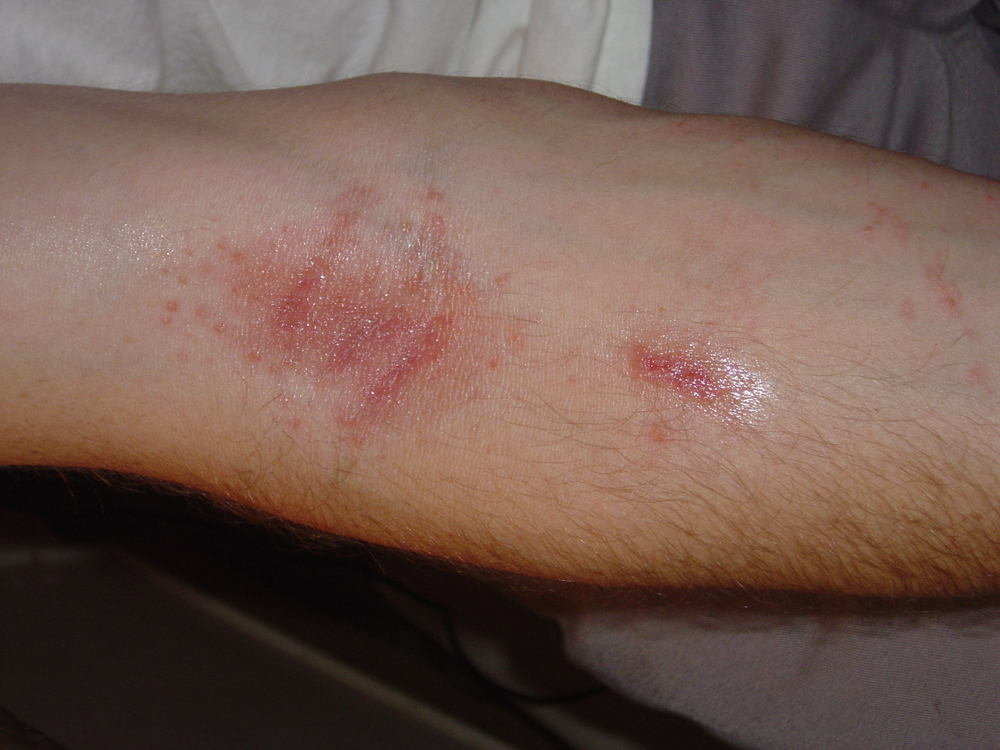
Poison ivy rash after 2 days

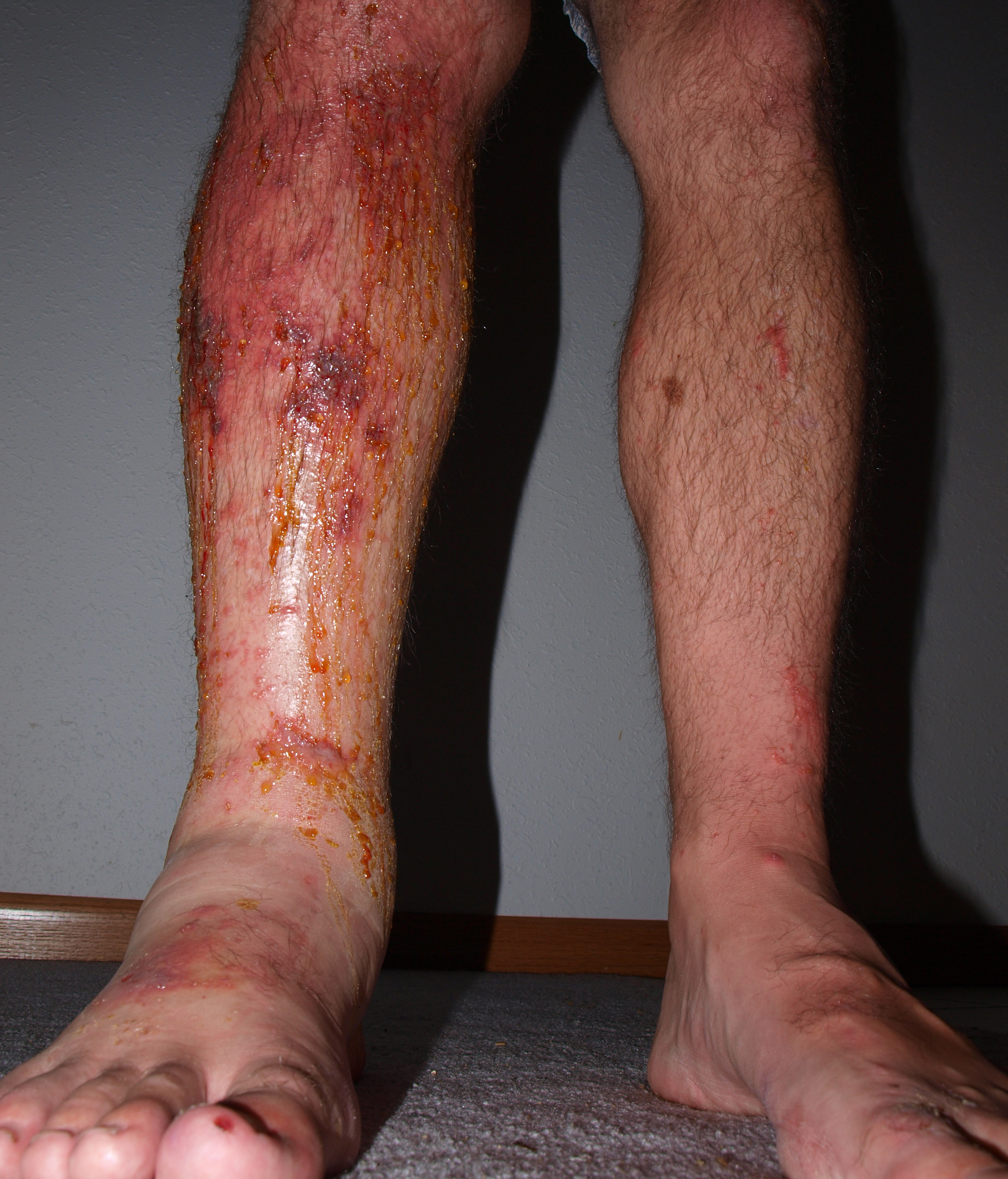
Poison ivy rash with swelling about 3 days after direct contact

== Cause ==
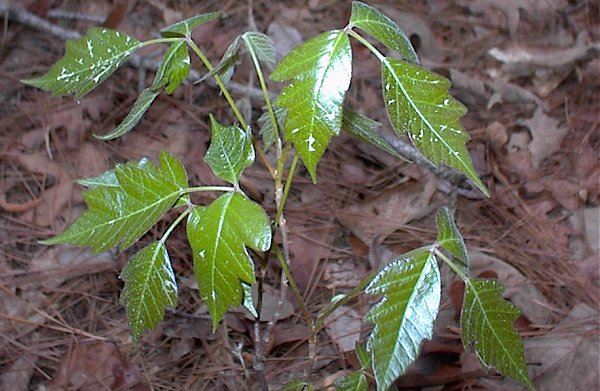
Toxicodendron pubescens (Atlantic poison oak), one of a large number of species containing urushiol irritants

Urushiol-induced contact dermatitis is caused by contact with a plant or any other object containing urushiol oil. The oil adheres to almost anything with which it comes in contact, such as towels, blankets, clothing, and landscaping tools. Common causes of exposure are clothing or other materials that touch the plant and then, before being washed, touch the skin.

For people who have never been exposed or are not yet allergic to urushiol, it may take 10 to 20 days for a reaction to occur the first time. Once allergic to urushiol, most people break out 48 to 72 hours after contact with the oil. Typically, individuals have been exposed at least once, if not several times, before they develop a rash. The rash typically persists one to two weeks, but in some cases may last up to five weeks.

Urushiol primarily is found in the spaces between cells beneath the outer skin of the plant, so exposure increases when plant tissue is crushed or damaged. Once the oil and resin are thoroughly washed from the skin, the rash is not contagious. Urushiol does not always spread once it has bonded with the skin, and cannot be transferred once the urushiol has been washed away.

Although simple skin exposure is most common, ingestion of urushiol can lead to serious, systemic reactions. Burning plant material is commonly said to create urushiol-laden smoke that causes a systemic reaction, as well as a rash in the throat and eyes. Firefighters often get rashes and eye inflammation from smoke-related contact. A high-temperature bonfire may incinerate urushiol before it can cause harm, while a smoldering fire may vaporize the volatile oil and spread it as white smoke. However, some sources dispute the danger of burning urushiol-containing plant material.

=== Species ===
Species that cause urushiol-induced contact dermatitis include all members of Toxicodendron, such as:

- T. radicans (poison ivy)
- T. pubescens (poison oak – eastern)
- T. diversilobum (poison oak – western)
- T. vernix (poison sumac)
- T. vernicifluum (Japanese lacquer tree)

Other members of the Anacardiaceae can produce a similar effect. People who are sensitive to urushiol also can experience a similar rash from mangoes, with the tree's sap and fruit's skin containing a similar chemical compound. A related allergenic compound is present in the raw shells of cashews. Similar reactions have been reported occasionally from contact with the related fragrant sumac (Rhus aromatica). Other similar taxa include:

- Gluta spp (rengas tree)
- Lithraea molleoides (aruera – South America)
- Smodingium argutum (African poison ivy)

== Mechanism ==
A video describing the mechanism of action for poison ivy and other plants containing urushiol

Urushiol is fat-soluble, penetrating the stratum corneum of the skin, then binding to Langerhans cells in the epidermis. The affected cells then migrate to lymph nodes, where T cells become activated, then return to the skin where they stimulate an urushiol-activated dermatitis. The toxic effect is indirect, mediated by an induced immune response. The oxidized urushiols act as haptens, chemically reacting with, binding to, and changing the shape of integral membrane proteins on exposed skin cells. Urushiols are oxidized in vivo, generating a quinone form of the molecules.

Affected proteins interfere with the immune system's ability to recognize these cells as normal parts of the body, causing a T-cell-mediated immune response. This response is directed at the complex of urushiol derivatives (namely, pentadecacatechol) bound in the skin proteins, attacking the cells as if they were foreign bodies.

== Treatments ==
Treatment consists of two phases: stopping the urushiol contact that is causing the reaction (this must be done within minutes), and, later, reducing the pain and itching.

Primary treatment involves washing exposed skin thoroughly with soap, cool water, and friction as soon as possible after exposure is discovered. Soap or detergent is necessary because urushiol is an oil that repels water; friction, with a washcloth or something similar, is necessary because urushiol adheres strongly to the skin. Commercial removal preparations, which are available in areas where poison ivy grows, usually contain surfactants, such as the nonionic detergent Triton X-100, to solubilize urushiol; some products also contain abrasives.

The U.S. Food and Drug Administration recommends applying a wet compress or soaking the affected area in cool water; topical corticosteroids (available over-the-counter) or oral corticosteroids (available by prescription); and topical skin protectants, such as zinc acetate, zinc carbonate, zinc oxide, and calamine. Baking soda or colloidal oatmeal can relieve minor irritation and itching. Aluminium triacetate, sometimes known as Burow's solution, can also ease the rash.

Showers or compresses using hot (but not scalding) water can relieve itching for up to several hours, though this "also taxes the skin's integrity, opening pores and generally making it more vulnerable", and is useful only for secondary treatment (not for cleaning urushiol from the skin, which should be done with cold water). People who have had a prior systemic reaction may be able to prevent subsequent exposure from turning systemic by avoiding heat and excitation of the circulatory system and applying moderate cold to any infected skin with pain.

In cases of extreme symptoms, steroids such as prednisone, triamcinolone, or dexamethasone are sometimes administered to attenuate the immune response and prevent long-term skin damage, especially if the eyes are involved. Prednisone is the most commonly prescribed systemic treatment, but it can cause serious adrenal suppression, so it must be taken carefully and tapered off slowly. If bacterial secondary infection of affected areas occurs, antibiotics may be necessary.

=== Further observations ===
- Ordinary laundering with laundry detergent will remove urushiol from most clothing.
- Urushiol may adhere to pet fur.
- Urushiol left on clothing and surfaces can be deactivated using bleach.
- The fluid from the resulting blisters does not spread urushiol to others.
- Blisters should be left unbroken during healing.
- Poison ivy and poison oak are still harmful when the leaves have fallen off, as the toxic residue is persistent, and exposure to any parts of plants containing urushiol can cause a rash at any time of the year.
- Ice, cold water, cooling lotions, and cold air do not help cure poison ivy rashes, but cooling can reduce inflammation and soothe the itch.
- Results for jewelweed as a natural agent for treatment are conflicting. Some studies indicate that it "failed to decrease symptoms of poison ivy dermatitis" [1980] and had "no prophylactic effect" [1997]. The juice of the leaves and stems of Impatiens capensis is a traditional Native American remedy for skin rashes, including poison ivy.

== Prevention ==
Up until the 1970s, drug manufacturers including Merck Sharp & Dohme and Parke-Davis sold oral preparations of urushiol, which were advertised as providing seasonal immunity and described by the Food and Drug Administration as "tested and proven to be effective." As of 2024, urushiol medications are not available in the United States.

A rarely cited double-blind study in 1982 reported that a course of oral urushiol usually hyposensitized subjects, with the principal side effect, pruritus ani, being reported by 85% of the participants who ingested the urushiol.

Research conducted on urushiol by Mahmoud ElSohly led to the development of PDC-APB, a candidate for a vaccine against skin irritation from poison ivy.

== See also ==
- Anti-itch drug
