= Toxicodendron calcicola =

Conservation status
- Endangered (IUCN 3.1)

Scientific classification
- Kingdom: Plantae
- Clade: Tracheophytes
- Clade: Angiosperms
- Clade: Eudicots
- Clade: Rosids
- Order: Sapindales
- Family: Anacardiaceae
- Genus: Toxicodendron
- Species: T. calcicola

Binomial name
- Toxicodendron calcicola C.Y.Wu

Species of flowering plant

Toxicodendron calcicola is an endangered species of plant in the family Anacardiaceae. It is endemic to the province of Yunnan in China.
