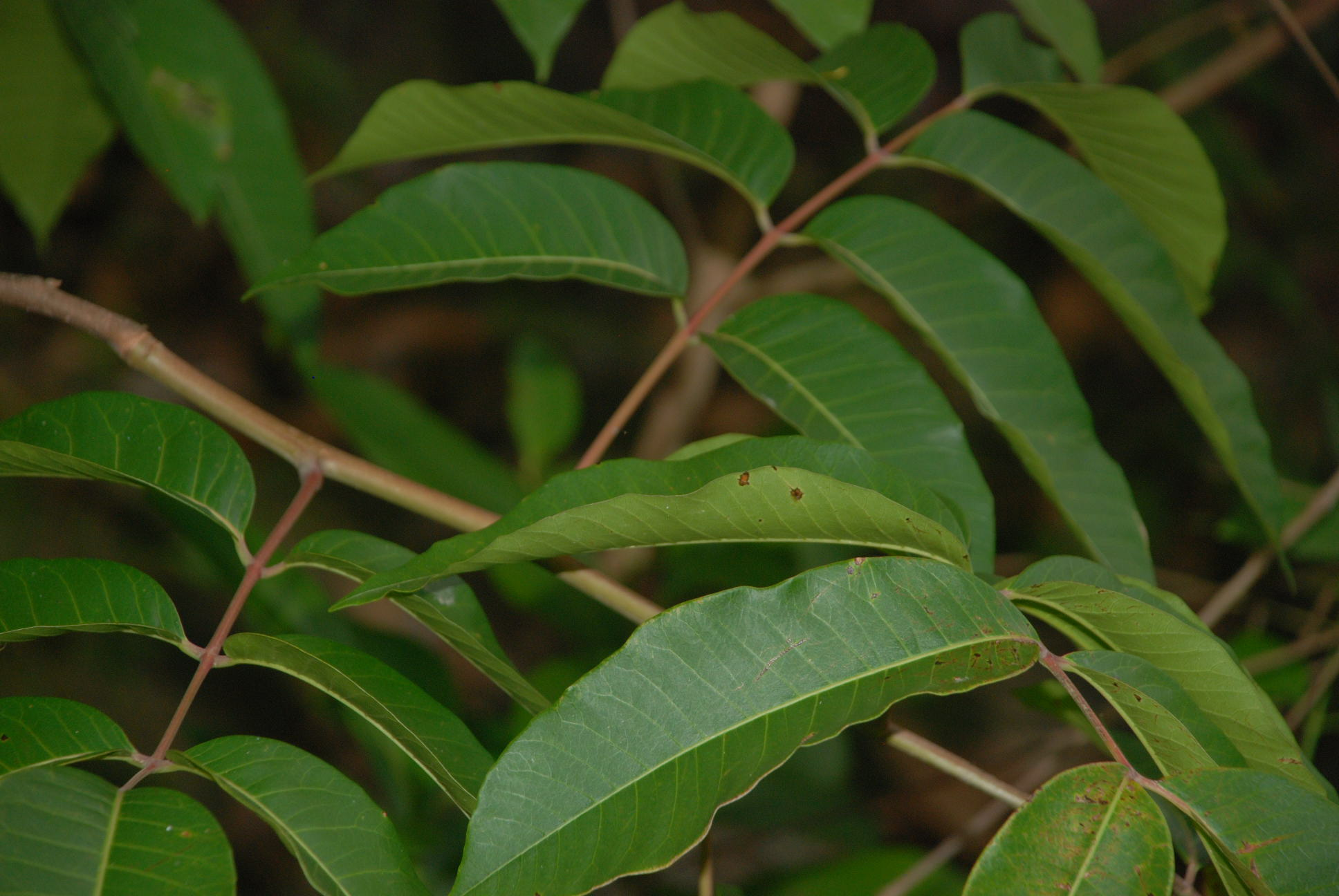

Conservation status
- Least Concern (IUCN 3.1)

Scientific classification
- Kingdom: Plantae
- Clade: Tracheophytes
- Clade: Angiosperms
- Clade: Eudicots
- Clade: Rosids
- Order: Sapindales
- Family: Anacardiaceae
- Genus: Toxicodendron
- Species: T. striatum

Binomial name
- Toxicodendron striatum (Ruiz & Pav.) Kuntze

Synonyms
- Rhus striata Ruiz & Pav.; Rhus juglandifolia Willd. ex Schult.; Rhus juglandifolia var. samo (Tul.) Engl.; Rhus samo Tul.; Rhus tetlatin Finck; Rhus tetlatziam Sessé & Moc.

= Toxicodendron striatum =

Species of plant

Toxicodendron striatum (syn. Rhus striata) is a South American poisonous tree in the family Anacardiaceae. It is commonly called manzanillo and grows in the tropical rain forests on low elevation slopes.
