= Japan wax =

Chemical compound

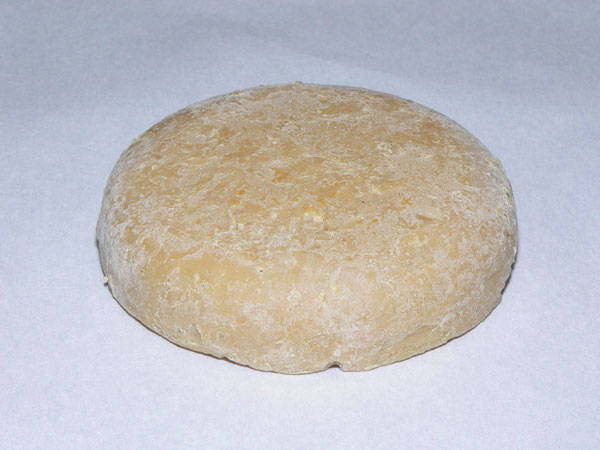
Japan wax

Japan wax (木蝋 Mokurō), also known as sumac wax, sumach wax, vegetable wax, China green tallow, and Japan tallow, is a pale-yellow, waxy, water-insoluble solid with a gummy feel, obtained from the berries of certain sumacs native to Japan and China, such as Toxicodendron vernicifluum (lacquer tree) and Toxicodendron succedaneum (Japanese wax tree).

Japan wax is a byproduct of lacquer manufacture. The fruits of the Toxicodendron trees are harvested, steamed, and pressed for the waxy substance which hardens when cool. It is not a true wax but a fat that contains 95% palmitin. Japan wax is sold in flat squares or disks and has a rancid odor. It is extracted by expression and heat, or by the action of solvents.

== Uses ==
Japan wax is used in candles, furniture polishes, floor waxes, wax matches, soaps, food packaging, pharmaceuticals, cosmetics, pastels, crayons, buffing compounds, metal lubricants, adhesives, thermoplastic resins, and as a substitute for beeswax. Since it undergoes rancidification, it is rarely used in foods.

== Properties ==
- Melting point = 51 °C (124 °F) or 45–53 °C (113–127 °F).
- Specific gravity ≈ 0.975
- Soluble in benzene, ether, naphtha and alkalis; insoluble in water and cold ethanol.
- Iodine value = 4.5–12.6
- Acid value = 6–209
- Saponification value = 220
