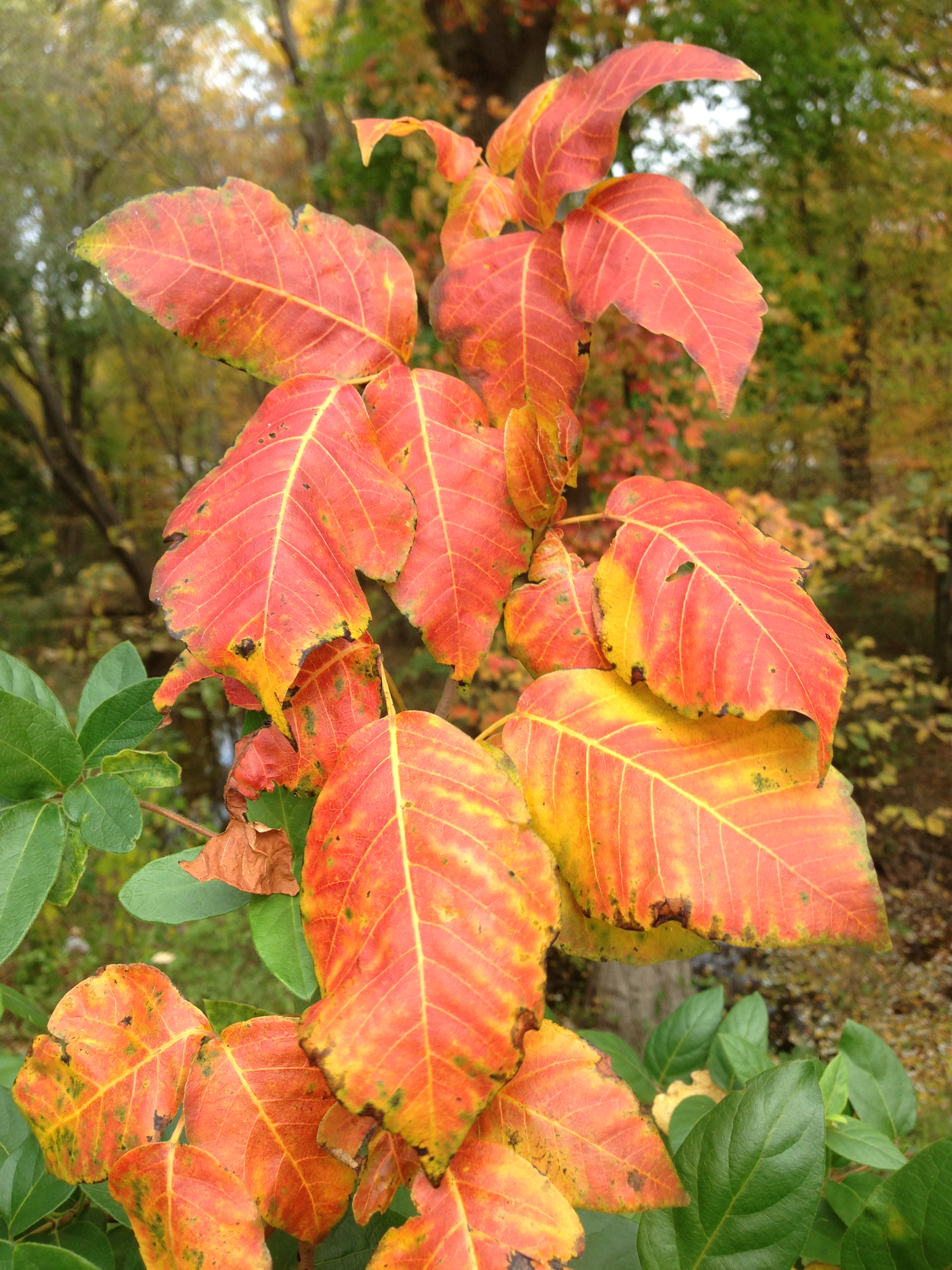
- Toxicodendron radicans in autumn

Scientific classification
- Kingdom: Plantae
- Clade: Tracheophytes
- Clade: Angiosperms
- Clade: Eudicots
- Clade: Rosids
- Order: Sapindales
- Family: Anacardiaceae
- Subfamily: Anacardioideae
- Genus: Toxicodendron

Species
- T. orientale Greene; T. radicans (L.) Kuntze; T. rydbergii (Small ex Rydb.) Greene

= Poison ivy =

Allergenic plant of Asia and North America

Poison ivy is a type of allergenic plant in the genus Toxicodendron, which is native to East Asia and North America. Formerly considered a single species, Toxicodendron radicans, poison ivies are now generally treated as a complex of three separate species: T. radicans, T. rydbergii, and T. orientale. They are variable in appearance and habit, and despite its common name, poison ivy is not an ivy (i.e., Hedera type), but rather a member of the cashew and pistachio family (Anacardiaceae).

Though T. radicans is commonly eaten by many animals and the seeds are consumed by birds, poison ivy is most often thought of as an unwelcome weed. It is well known for causing urushiol-induced contact dermatitis, an itchy, irritating, and sometimes painful rash, in most people who touch them. The rash is caused by urushiol, a clear liquid compound in the plant's sap. Despite the name of “poison” ivy, urushiol is not a true poison and is an allergen, to which 15% of people are resistant.

== Description ==
Poison ivies can grow as small plants, shrubs, or climbing vines. They are characterized by pinnately compound leaves, each containing three leaflets, hence the common expression "leaves of three, let it be". These leaves can vary between an elliptic to egg shape and will have either smooth, lobed, or toothed margins. Additionally, the pinnate leaves are alternate on the stem. Clusters of small, greenish flowers bloom from May to July and produce white berries in the fall a few millimeters in diameter. Its vines can be grown onto fences, poles, and trees.

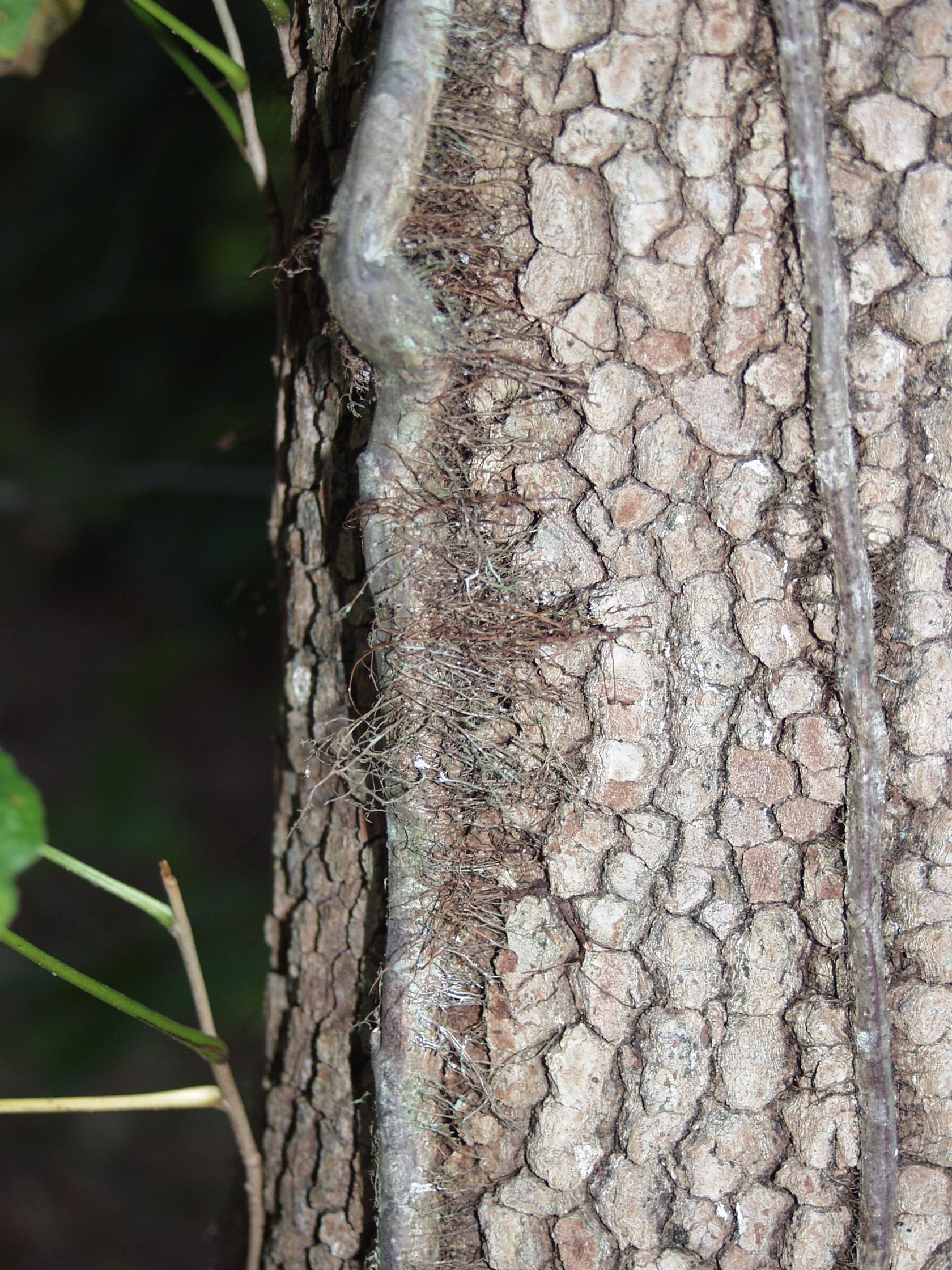
T. radicans vine with typical reddish "hairs"

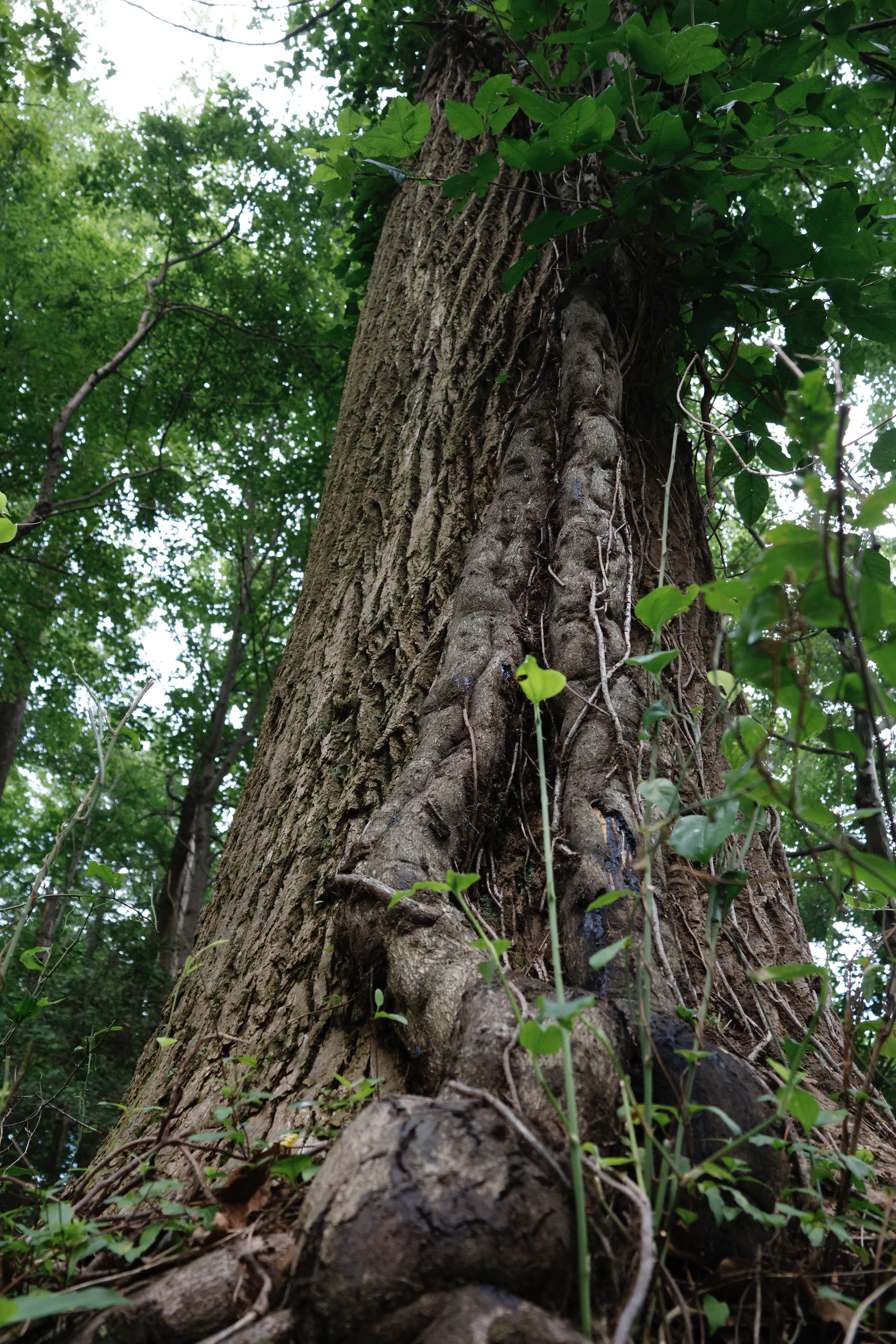
Large poison ivy vine

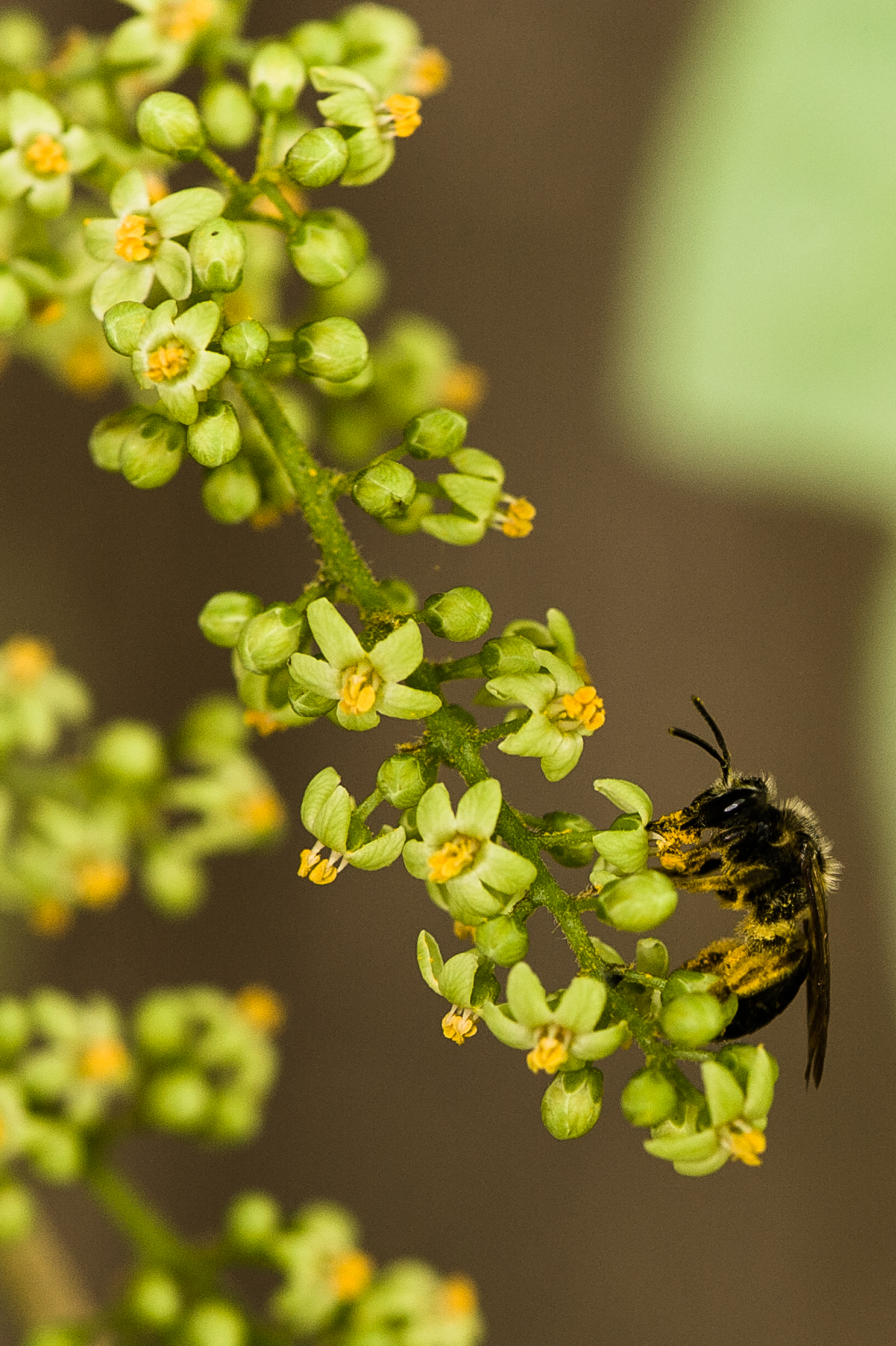
Flower detail, with bee

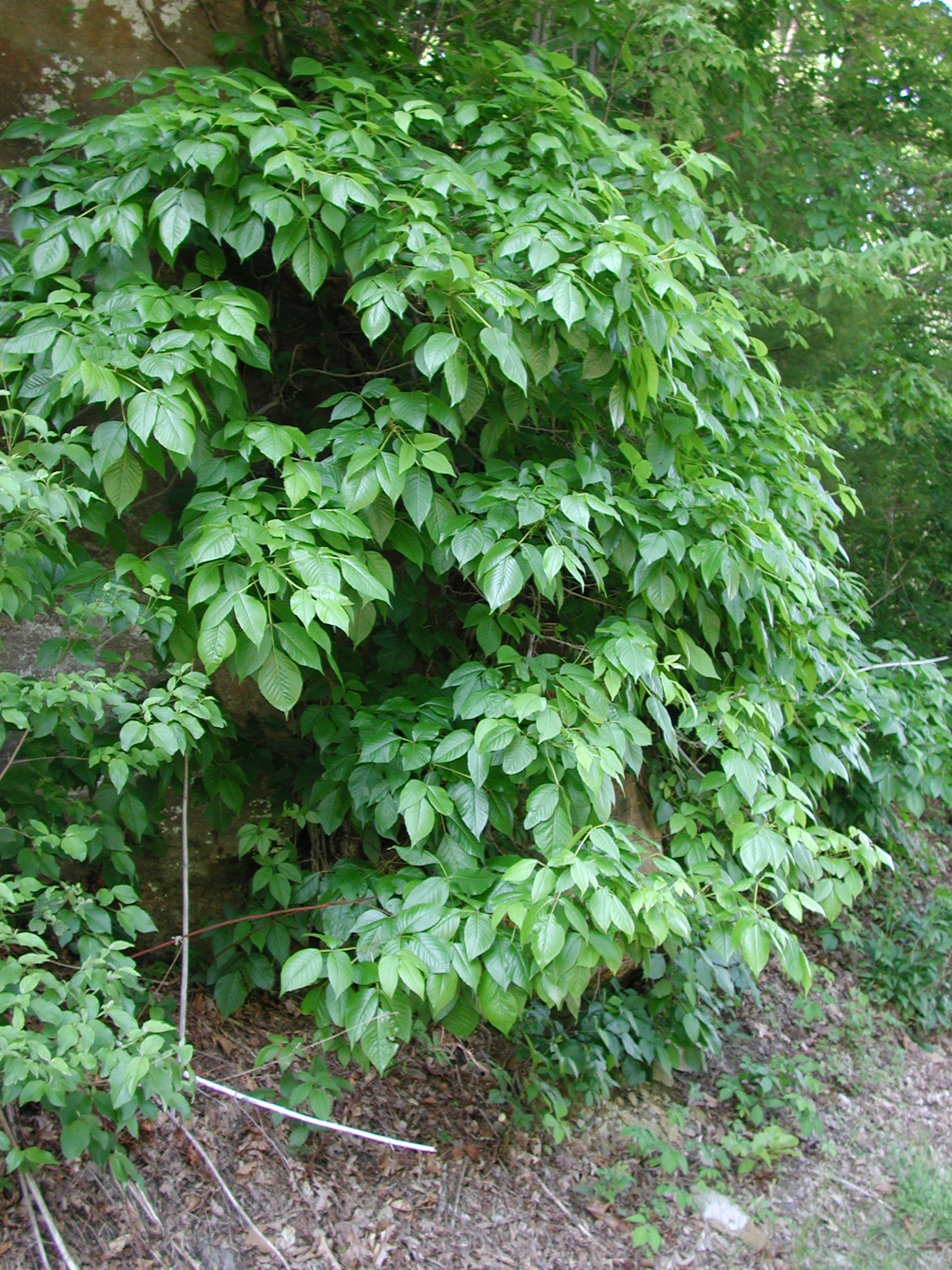
Poison ivy on a roadside

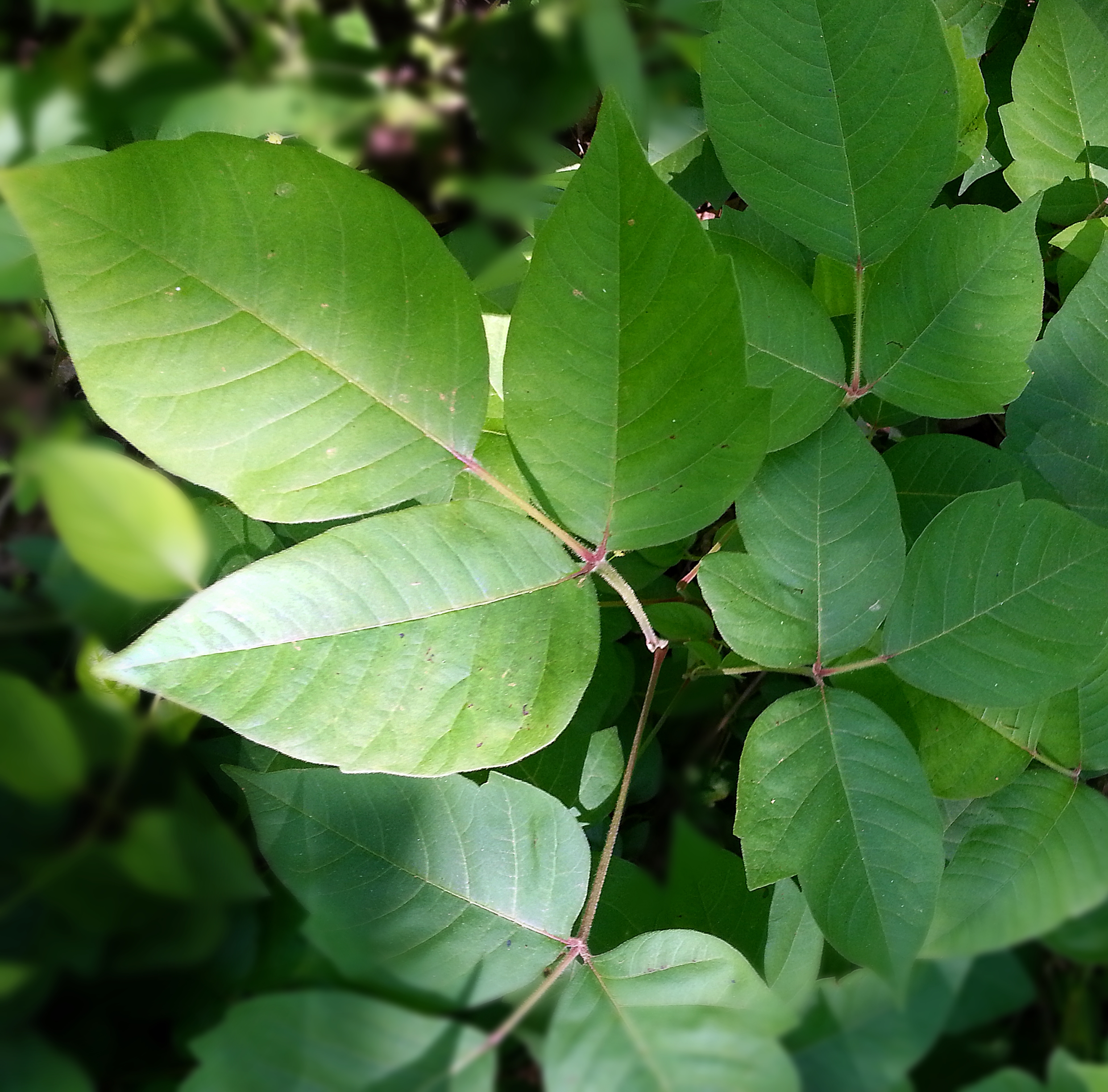
Leaves may be smooth or notched on the same plant.

== Species ==
Three species of poison ivy are generally recognised; they are sometimes considered subspecies of Toxicodendron radicans:

- Toxicodendron orientale: found in East Asia.
- Toxicodendron radicans: found throughout eastern Canada and the United States, Mexico and Central America, Bermuda and the Bahamas.
- Toxicodendron rydbergii: found throughout Canada and much of the United States except the southeast.

== Toxicity ==
A video describing the effects of poison ivy on the body

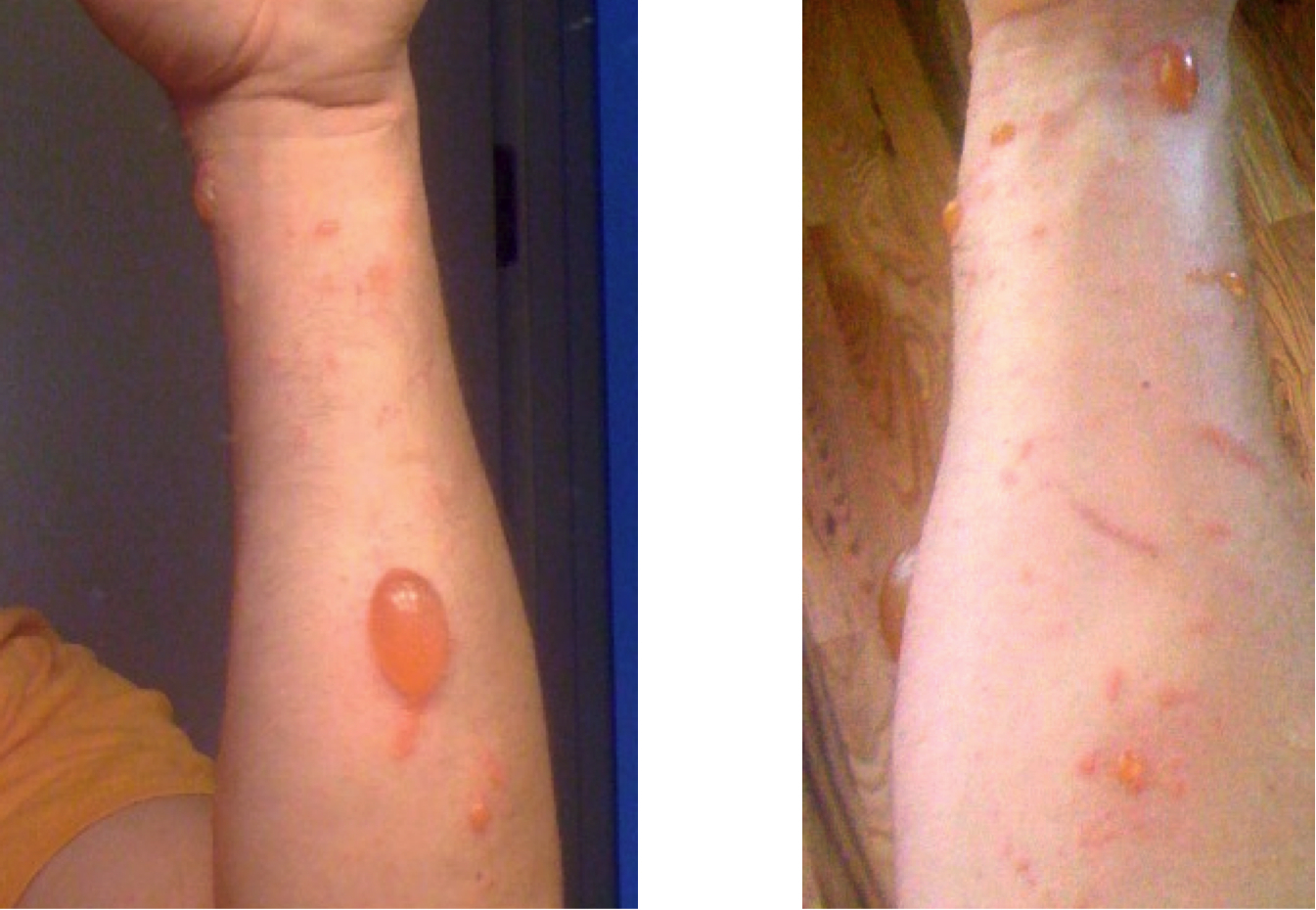
Blisters from contact with poison ivy

Urushiol-induced contact dermatitis is the allergic reaction caused by poison ivy. In extreme cases, a reaction can progress to anaphylaxis. Around 15 to 25 percent of people have no allergic reaction to urushiol, but most people have a greater reaction with repeated or more concentrated exposure.

Over 350,000 people are affected by urushiol annually in the United States.

The oozing fluids released by scratching blisters do not spread the poison. The fluid in the blisters is produced by the body and it is not urushiol itself. The appearance of a spreading rash indicates that some areas received more of the poison and reacted sooner than other areas or that contamination is still occurring from contact with objects to which the original poison was spread.

Those affected can unknowingly spread the urushiol inside the house, on phones, door knobs, couches, counters, desks, and so on, thus repeatedly coming into contact with poison ivy and extending the length of time of the rash. If this happens, the surfaces should be wiped with bleach or a commercial urushiol removal agent. The blisters and oozing result from blood vessels that develop gaps and leak fluid through the skin; if the skin is cooled, the vessels constrict and leak less. If plant material with urushiol is burned and the smoke then inhaled, this rash will appear on the lining of the lungs, causing extreme pain and possibly fatal respiratory difficulty. If poison ivy is eaten, the mucus lining of the mouth and digestive tract can be damaged.

Urushiol oil can remain active for several years, so handling dead leaves or vines can cause a reaction. In addition, oil transferred from the plant to other objects (such as pet fur) can cause the rash if it comes into contact with the skin. Clothing, tools, and other objects that have been exposed to oil should be washed to prevent further reactions.

=== Treatment ===
Immediate washing with soap and cold water or rubbing alcohol may help prevent a reaction. During a reaction, calamine lotion may help mitigate symptoms. Corticosteroids, either applied to the skin or taken by mouth, may be appropriate in extreme cases. An astringent containing aluminum acetate (such as Burow's solution) may also provide relief and soothe the uncomfortable symptoms of the rash.

Urushiol binds to the skin on contact where it causes severe itching that develops into reddish inflammation or uncoloured bumps, and then blistering. These lesions may be treated with calamine lotion, Burow's solution compresses, dedicated commercial poison ivy itch creams, or baths to relieve discomfort, though recent studies have shown some traditional medicines to be ineffective. Over-the-counter products to ease itching—or simply oatmeal baths and baking soda—are now recommended by dermatologists for the treatment of poison ivy.

A plant-based remedy cited to counter urushiol-induced contact dermatitis is jewelweed, though jewelweed extracts had no positive effect in clinical studies. Others argue that prevention of lesions is easy if one practices effective washing, using plain soap, scrubbing with a washcloth, and rinsing three times within 2–8 hours of exposure.

The pentadecyl catechols of the oleoresin within the sap of poison ivy and related plants causes the allergic reaction; the plants produce a mixture of pentadecylcatechols, which collectively is called urushiol. After injury, the sap leaks to the surface of the plant where the urushiol becomes a blackish lacquer after contact with oxygen.

=== Prognosis ===
Typically, the rash from the urushiol oil lasts about five to twelve days, but in extreme cases it can last a month or more. A urushiol rash usually develops within a week of exposure and can last 1–4 weeks, depending on severity and treatment. In rare cases, urushiol reactions may require hospitalization.

=== Immunity ===
It is a myth that repeated exposure via skin contact or ingestion to poison ivy will lessen its effects or confer an immunity to it (as a form of Mithridatism.) On the contrary, some evidence suggests an individual's immune response to a repeated poison ivy exposure may be more rapid compared to an initial one, forming in hours instead of days.
