= List of pistachio diseases =

This article is a list of diseases of pistachios (Pistacia vera).

== Fungal diseases ==
Fungal diseases
Alternaria late blight	Alternaria alternata
Armillaria root rot	Armillaria mellea
Aspergillus fruit rot	Aspergillus niger
Blossom and shoot blight	Botrytis cinerea Botryotinia fuckeliana [teleomorph]
Camarosporium shoot and panicle blight	Camarosporium pistaciae
Cotton root rot (also known as Phymatotrichum Root Rot)	Phymatotrichopsis omnivora
Eutypa dieback	Eutypa lata Libertella blepharis [anamorph]
Gum canker	Cytospora terebinthi
Leaf spot	Phyllosticta lentisci
Panicle and shoot blight	Botryosphaeria dothidea
Phomopsis shoot blight	Phomopsis sp.
Powdery mildew	Phyllactinia angulata
Phytophthora root and crown rot	Phytophthora capsici Phytophthora citricola Phytophthora citrophthora Phytophthora cryptogea Phytophthora nicotianae var. parasitica
Rust	Pileolaria terebinthi = Uromyces terebinthi
Sclerotinia shoot blight	Sclerotinia sclerotiorum
Seedling blight	Rhizoctonia solani Thanatephorus cucumeris [teleomorph]
Septoria leaf spot	Pseudocercospora pistacina Septoria pistaciarum Septoria pistaciae
Stigmatomycosis	Ashbya gossypii Eremothecium coryli = Nematospora coryli Aureobasidium pullulans
Thread blight	Ceratobasidium sp.
Phytophthora trunk and bark canker	Phytophthora capsici Phytophthora cryptogea Phytophthora nicotianae var. parasitica
Verticillium wilt	Verticillium dahliae

== Diseases of uncertain cause ==
Diseases of uncertain cause
Damage by other means	Unknown
Dieback and canker	Suspected: Paecilomyces variotii Bainier
Peter's scorch	Unknown
Pin sized lesion	Unknown

== Miscellaneous diseases and disorders ==
Miscellaneous diseases and disorders
Navel Orange worm	Insect feeding injury
Epicarp lesion	Insect feeding injury
Sapwood rot	Pleurotus ostreatus Schizophyllum commune
