= P. viticola =

P. viticola may refer to:

- Phomopsis viticola, the agent of the phomopsis leaf, also called cane spot or fruit rot disease
- Plasmopara viticola, the agent of the downy mildew in grape
