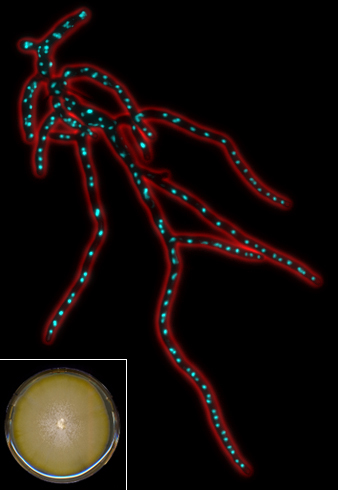
- Fluorescent micrograph of Eremothecium gossypii mycelium.

Scientific classification
- Kingdom: Fungi
- Division: Ascomycota
- Class: Saccharomycetes
- Order: Saccharomycetales
- Family: Saccharomycetaceae
- Genus: Eremothecium
- Species: E. gossypii

Binomial name
- Eremothecium gossypii (S.F. Ashby & W. Nowell) Kurtzman, 1995

Synonyms
- Nematospora gossypii (S.F. Ashby & W. Nowell, 1926); Ashbya gossypii Guillierm., 1928

= Eremothecium gossypii =

Species of fungus

Eremothecium gossypii (also known as Ashbya gossypii) is a filamentous fungus or mold closely related to yeast, but growing exclusively in a filamentous way. It was originally isolated from cotton as a pathogen causing stigmatomycosis by Ashby and Nowell in 1926. This disease affects the development of hair cells in cotton bolls and can be transmitted to citrus fruits, which thereupon dry out and collapse (dry rot disease). In the first part of the 20th century, E. gossypii and two other fungi causing stigmatomycosis (Eremothecium coryli, Aureobasidium pullulans) made it virtually impossible to grow cotton in certain regions of the subtropics, causing severe economical losses. Control of the spore-transmitting insects - cotton stainer (Dysdercus suturellus) and Antestiopsis (antestia bugs) - permitted full eradication of infections. E. gossypii was recognized as a natural overproducer of riboflavin (vitamin B_{2}), which protects its spores against ultraviolet light. This made it an interesting organism for industries, where genetically modified strains are still used to produce this vitamin.

== Eremothecium gossypii as a model organism ==
A few years ago, E. gossypii became recognized as an attractive model to study the growth of long and multinucleate fungal cells (hyphae) because of its small genome, haploid nuclei, and efficient gene targeting methods. It is generally assumed that a better understanding of filamentous fungal growth will greatly stimulate the development of novel fungicides. Its use as a model organism is particularly promising because of the high level of gene order conservation (synteny) between the genomes of E. gossypii and the yeast Saccharomyces cerevisiae.

== Genome ==
The complete sequencing and annotation of the entire E. gossypii genome, as published in 2004, was initiated when a significant degree of gene synteny was observed in preliminary studies in comparison to the genome of budding yeast, Saccharomyces cerevisiae. This not only helped to improve gene annotation of S. cerevisiae, but also allowed the reconstruction of the evolutionary history of both organisms. E. gossypii and S. cerevisiae originated from a common ancestor which carried about 5000 genes. Divergence of these two close relatives started some 100 million years ago. One branch of evolution involving up to 100 viable genome rearrangements (translocations and inversions), a few million base pair changes, and a limited number of gene deletions, duplications and additions lead to modern E. gossypii with its 4718 protein-coding genes and 9.2 million base pairs (smallest genome of a free-living eukaryote yet characterized) spread over seven chromosomes. The genome of S. cerevisiae underwent a more eventful evolution, which includes a whole-genome duplication.

Despite the long evolutionary history of the two organisms and fundamentally different ways of growth and development, the complete synteny map of both genomes reveals 95% of E. gossypii genes are orthologs of S. cerevisiae genes, and 90% map within blocks of synteny (syntenic homologs).

== Growth, development and morphology ==
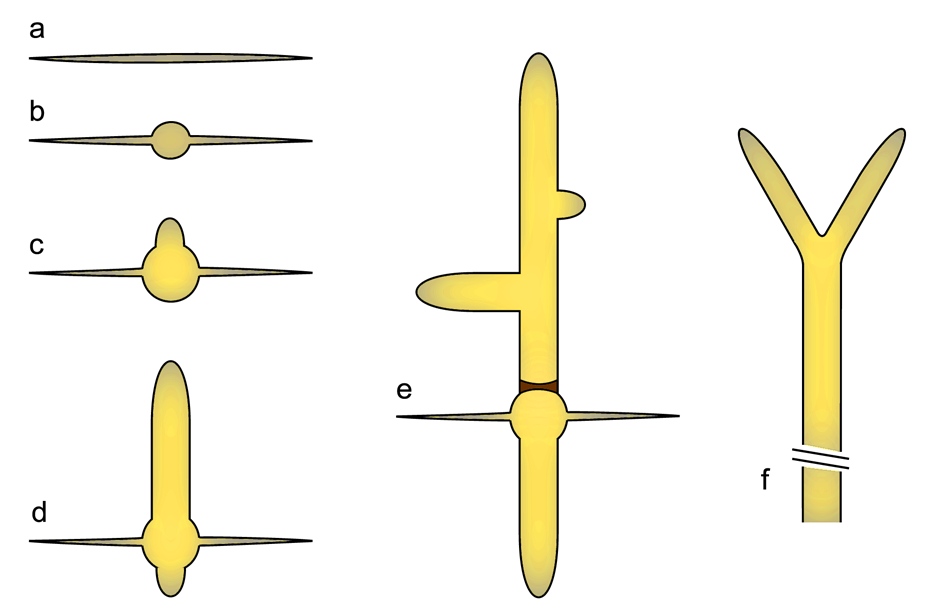
Development from a spore to a mature mycelium in E. gossypii (kindly provided by Dr. Philipp Knechtle) a) Ungerminated spore b) Isotropic growth phase in the germ bubble c) Unipolar germling d) Emergence of a second germ tube e) Emergence of lateral branches and septum generation f) Apical branching in mature hypha

The E. gossypii life cycle starts with the only known phase of isotropic growth in wild type: germination of the haploid spore to form a germ bubble. This is followed by apical growth, extending two germ tubes in succession on opposing sites of the germ bubble. More axes of polarity are established with [lateral branch formation in young mycelium. Maturation is characterized by apical branching (tip splitting) and a dramatic increase of growth speed (up to 200 μm/h at 30 °C), which enables it to cover an 8 cm Petri dish of full medium in about seven days. Sporulation is thought to be induced by nutrient deprivation, leading to contraction at the septa, cytokinesis and subsequent abscission of sporangia which contain up to eight haploid spores. Hyphae are compartmentalized by septa, which in young parts appear as rings that allow transfer of nuclei and in older parts may appear as closed discs. Compartments typically contain around eight nuclei.
