= Antestia =

Scientific classification
- Domain: Eukaryota
- Kingdom: Animalia
- Phylum: Arthropoda
- Class: Insecta
- Order: Hemiptera
- Suborder: Heteroptera
- Family: Pentatomidae
- Subfamily: Pentatominae
- Tribe: Antestiini
- Genus: Antestia; Stål, 1865

Synonyms
- Farnya Schouteden, 1910

Genus of bugs

External image
- Images at iNaturalist

Antestia is a genus of African and Asian bugs in the subfamily Pentatominae, erected by Carl Stål, 1865.

The term is also a common name for other genera of African shield bugs in the tribe Antestiini, including coffee pests in this genus, with species also having been reassigned to Antestiopsis.

== Species ==
BioLib lists:

1. Antestia amberensis Cachan, 1952
2. Antestia arlechino (Vollenhoven, 1868)
3. Antestia atrosignata Distant, 1906
4. Antestia basilewskyi (Schouteden, 1957)
5. Antestia bequaerti Schouteden, 1913
6. Antestia cameronica Hasan, 1991
7. Antestia chambereti (Le Guillou, 1841)
8. Antestia colorata (Schouteden, 1910)
9. Antestia cruciata (Fabricius, 1775)
10. Antestia dollingi Rider & Rolston, 1995
11. Antestia ellenriederi Breddin, 1900
12. Antestia falsa Schouteden, 1912
13. Antestia gibba Breddin, 1904
14. Antestia guttifera Gerstaecker, 1892
15. Antestia ignobilis (Vollenhoven, 1868)
16. Antestia instabilis (Vollenhoven, 1868)
17. Antestia javana Kirkaldy, 1909
18. Antestia korinchiensis Hasan, 1991
19. Antestia laevigata Breddin, 1901
20. Antestia lata Bergroth, 1891
21. Antestia lestoni (Villiers, 1959)
22. Antestia macgavini Hasan & Abro, 1992
23. Antestia maculata (Dallas, 1851)
24. Antestia major Ahmad & Rana, 1989
25. Antestia nura (Vollenhoven, 1868)
26. Antestia partita (Walker, 1867)
27. Antestia pauperata Breddin, 1901
28. Antestia perroudi (Montrouzier, 1858)
29. Antestia philippina Breddin, 1904
30. Antestia picta (Schouteden, 1929)
31. Antestia plautioides Breddin, 1909
32. Antestia polyspila (Walker, 1867)
33. Antestia quadrimaculata Walker, 1867
34. Antestia rikatlensis (Schouteden, 1910)
35. Antestia rorulenta Bergroth, 1891
36. Antestia rufovittata Distant, 1910
37. Antestia scurra (Vollenhoven, 1868)
38. Antestia securigera (Walker, 1867)
39. Antestia subconcolor Breddin, 1913
40. Antestia trispinosa Linnavuori, 1973
41. Antestia unicolor Hasan, 1991
42. Antestia usambarica Schouteden, 1912
43. Antestia variabilis (Cachan, 1952)
44. Antestia variegata (Thunberg, 1783)
45. Antestia versicolor (Distant, 1881)
46. Antestia viridis (Signoret, 1858)
