= Pseudocercospora pistacina =

Scientific classification
- Domain: Eukaryota
- Kingdom: Fungi
- Division: Ascomycota
- Class: Dothideomycetes
- Order: Capnodiales
- Family: Mycosphaerellaceae
- Genus: Pseudocercospora
- Species: P. pistacina

Binomial name
- Pseudocercospora pistacina (Allesch.) Crous, Quaedvl. & Sarpkaya

Synonyms
- Septoria pistacina Allesch.; Dothidea pistaciae Lév.; Septoria pistaciae (Lév.) Cooke; Mycosphaerella pistacina Chitzan.

Species of fungal plant pathogen

Pseudocercospora pistacina is a species of fungus in the family Mycosphaerellaceae. Known from Greece, Iran, Syria, and Turkey, it is a plant pathogen that infects the leaves of pistachio trees (Pistacia vera). It is one of the causative agents of a leaf spot disease commonly known as Pseudocercospora leaf spot (PLS) or Septoria leaf spot (SLS), alongside Septoria pistaciarum and Septoria pistaciae.

== See also ==
- List of pistachio diseases
