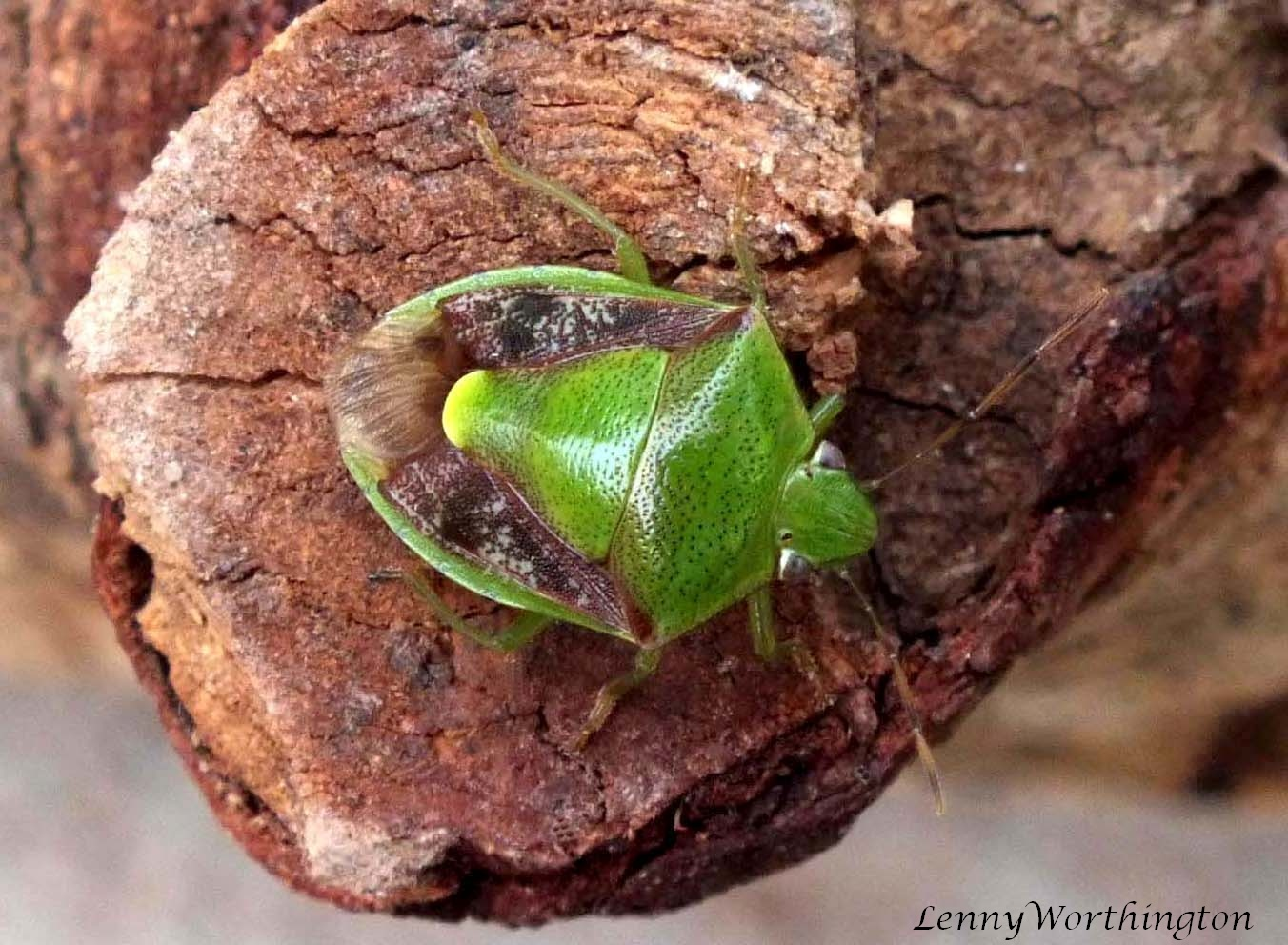
- Plautia crossota

Scientific classification
- Kingdom: Animalia
- Phylum: Arthropoda
- Class: Insecta
- Order: Hemiptera
- Suborder: Heteroptera
- Family: Pentatomidae
- Subfamily: Pentatominae
- Tribe: Antestiini
- Genus: Plautia; Stål, 1864

= Plautia =

Genus of true bugs

Plautia is a genus of stink bugs in the family Pentatomidae. There are about five described species in Plautia, found primarily in south and east Asia and Oceania.

== Species ==
These five species belong to the genus Plautia:

- Plautia affinis (Dallas, 1851)
- Plautia crossota (Dallas, 1851)
- Plautia splendens Distant, 1900
- Plautia stali Scott, 1874
- Plautia viridicollis (Westwood, 1837)

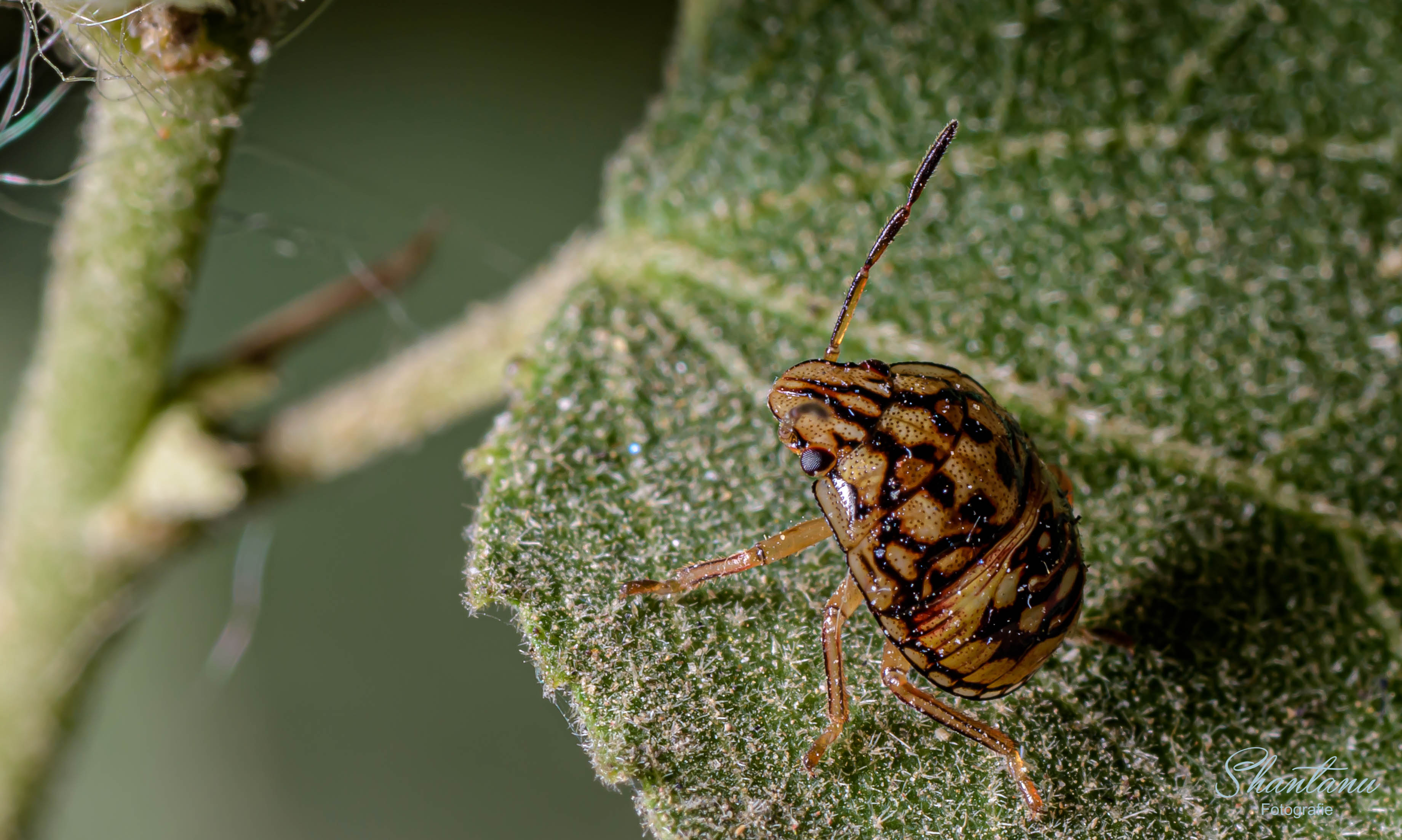
Plautia nymph

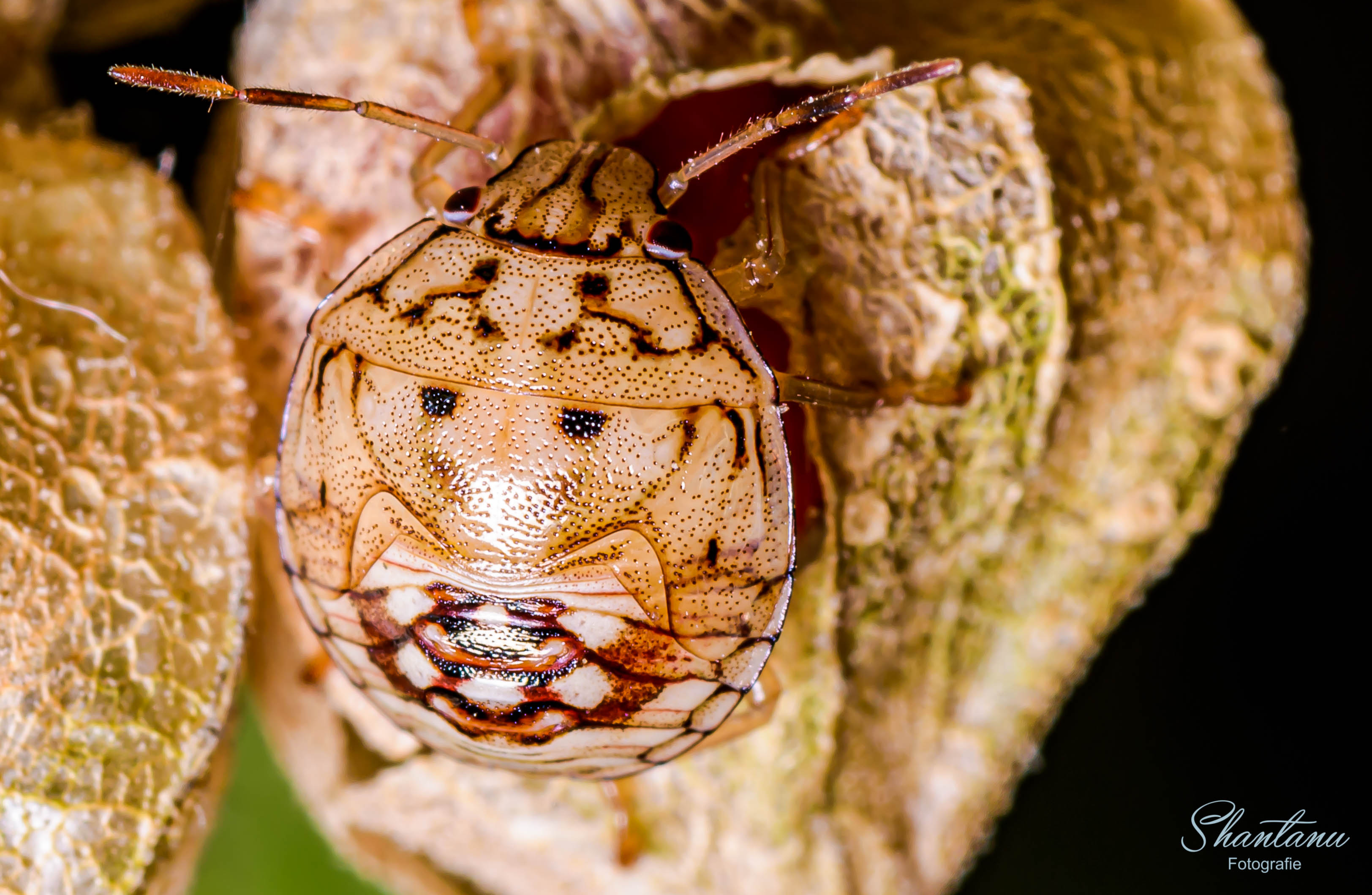
Plautia nymph
