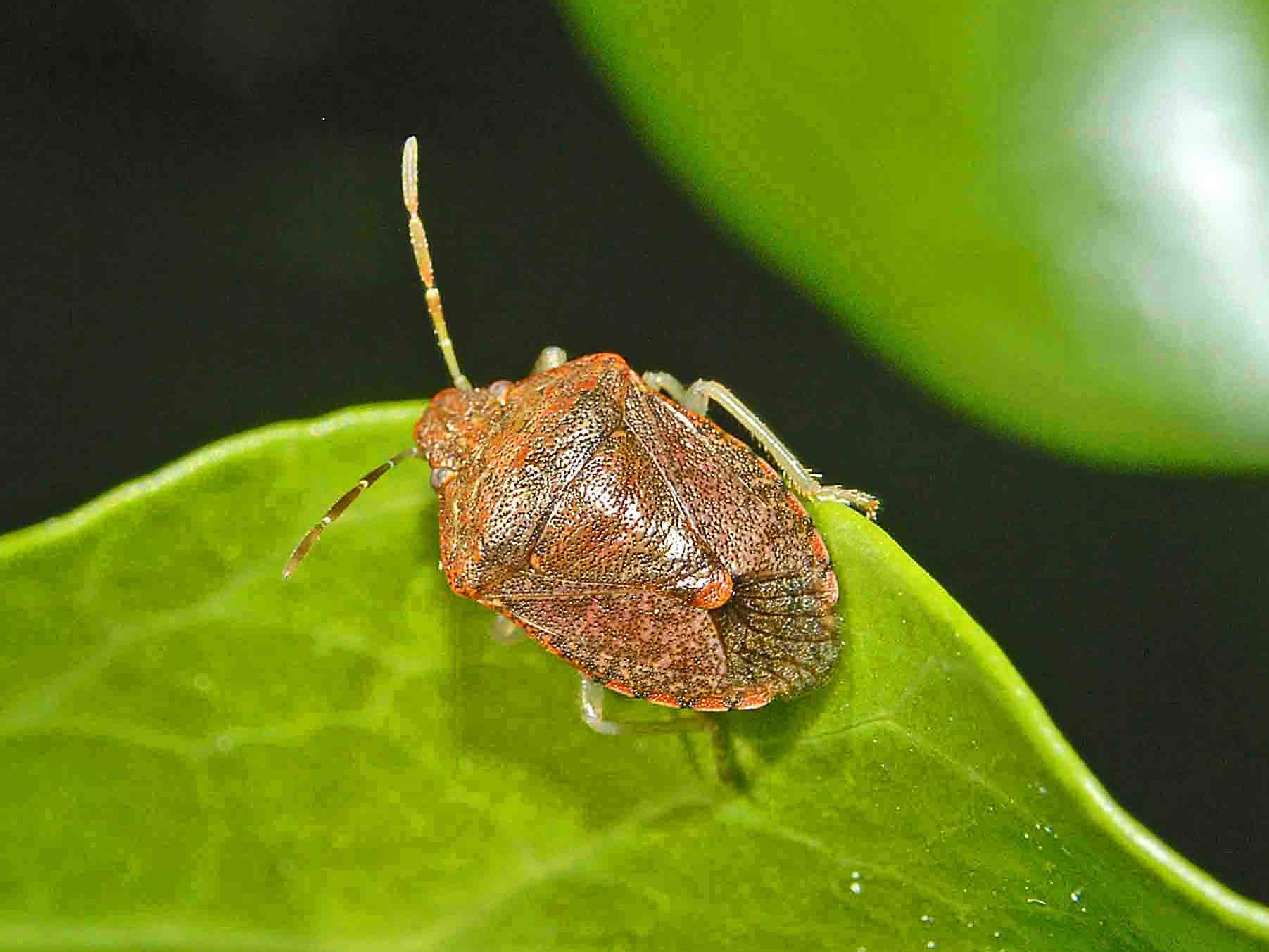

Scientific classification
- Kingdom: Animalia
- Phylum: Arthropoda
- Clade: Pancrustacea
- Class: Insecta
- Order: Hemiptera
- Suborder: Heteroptera
- Family: Pentatomidae
- Genus: Dryadocoris
- Species: D. apicalis

Binomial name
- Dryadocoris apicalis (Herrich-Schaeffer, 1842)

Synonyms
- Cimex apicalis Herrich-Schäffer, 1842; Dryadocoris analis (A. Costa, 1847); Holcostethus jani Fieber, 1861; Holcostethus obscuratus Distant, 1892; Pentatoma analis Costa, 1847; Pentatoma bipunctipes Signoret, 1858; Pentatoma confinis Walker, 1867; Pentatoma heterocera Walker, 1867; Pentatoma inquinata Stål, 1853

= Dryadocoris apicalis =

Species of true bug

Dryadocoris apicalis is a species of shield bugs of the family Pentatomidae.

== Description ==
Dryadocoris apicalis can reach an adult length of 6–7 millimetres (0.24–0.28 in).

== Distribution ==
This species can be found in France, Italy, Spain, Portugal, Canary Islands, Morocco, Algeria and in various sub-saharan countries.
