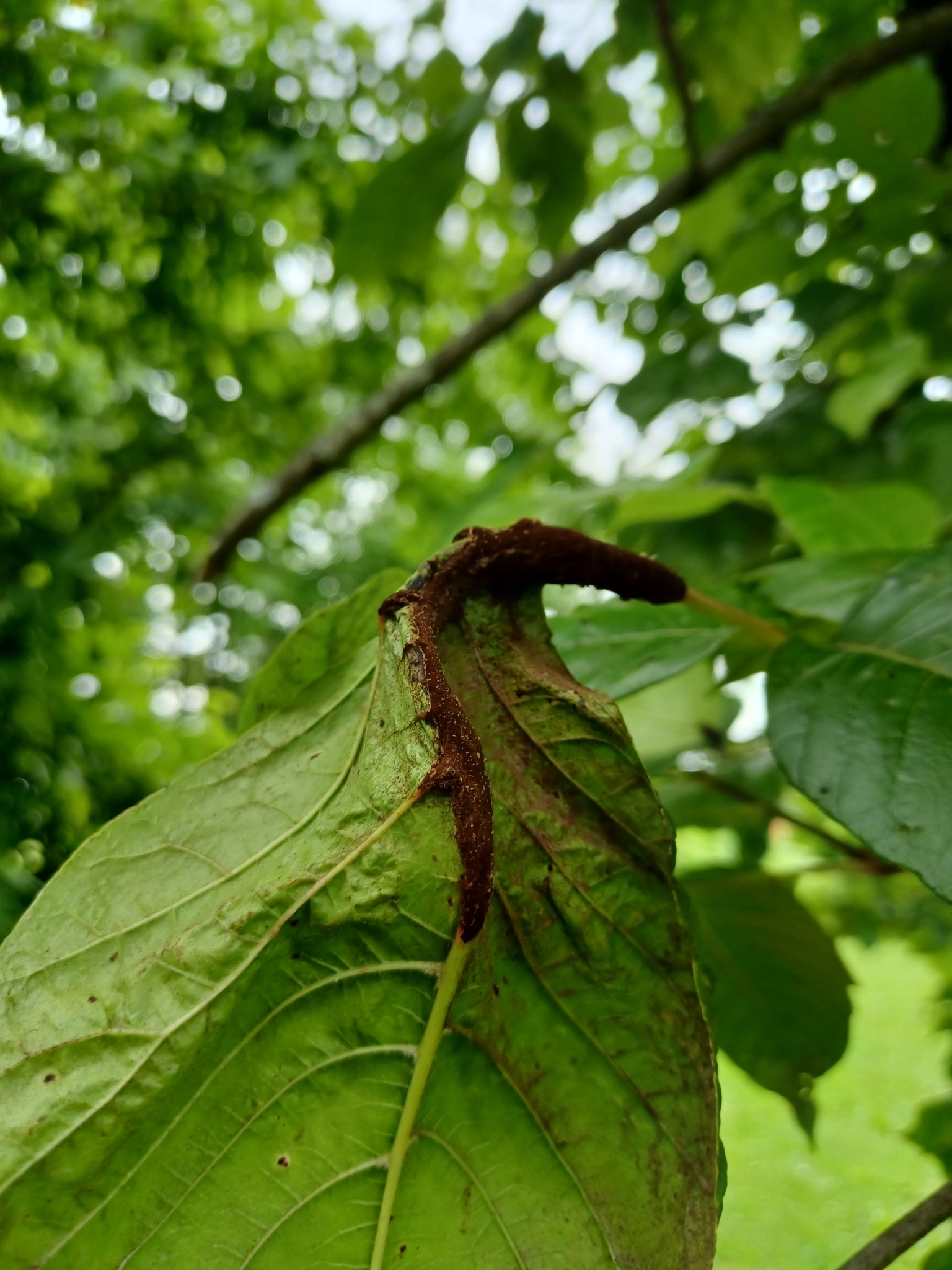

Scientific classification
- Domain: Eukaryota
- Kingdom: Fungi
- Division: Basidiomycota
- Class: Pucciniomycetes
- Order: Pucciniales
- Family: Pileolariaceae
- Genus: Pileolaria
- Species: P. brevipes

Binomial name
- Pileolaria brevipes Berk. and Rav.

Synonyms
- P. toxicodendri

= Pileolaria brevipes =

Species of fungus

Pileolaria brevipes, also known as poison ivy rust, is a species of autoecious fungus in the order Pucciniales. Pileolaria brevipes parasitizes Toxicodendron diversilobum and Toxicodendron radicans. The color of this rust comes from "its asexual spores called urediospores". Poison ivy rust infections become evident in spring as "light pink to dark red swellings on leaflet veins or petioles. By late June, swellings have darkened to brown, and grown. The leaflet or leaf typically exhibits a curled morphology and oftentimes is wilted. Individuals infected with P. brevipes are less prone to flower compared to adjacent, noninfected congeners".

Damaging arthropod associates of Toxicodendron species include Epipaschia zelleri and the poison ivy sawfly.
