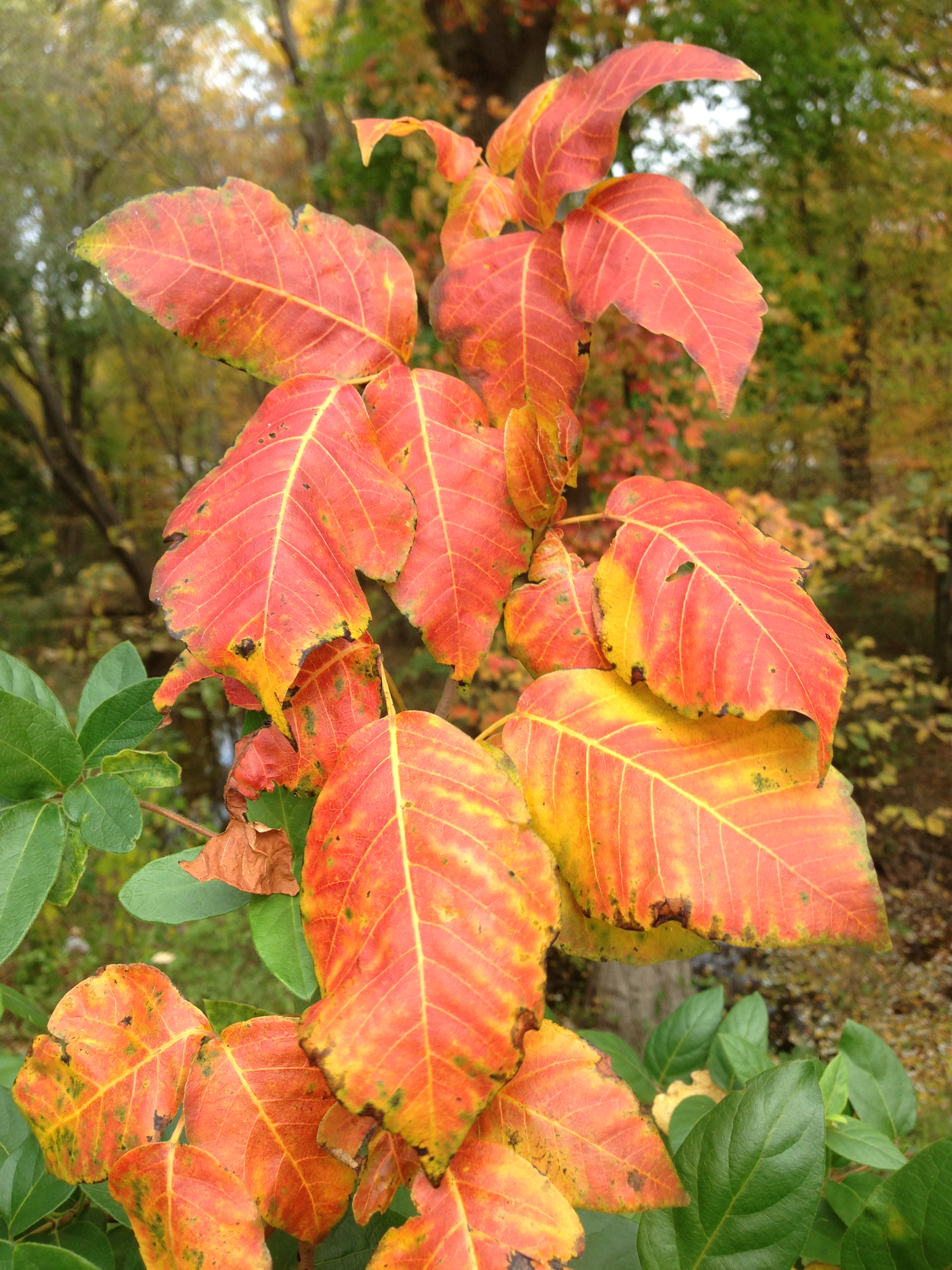
- During autumn
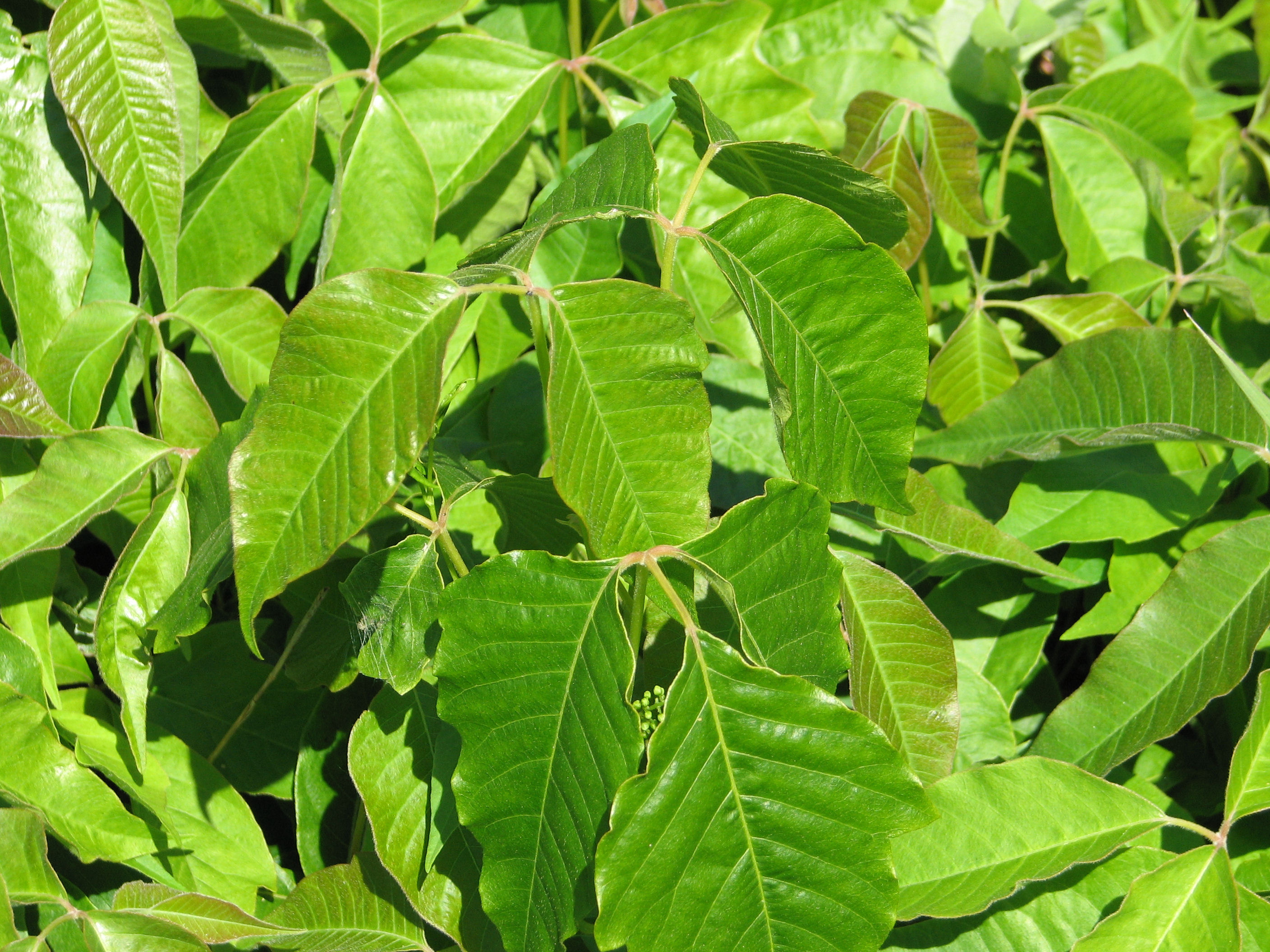
- In spring, Ottawa, Ontario

Conservation status
- Least Concern (IUCN 3.1)

- Secure (NatureServe)

Scientific classification
- Kingdom: Plantae
- Clade: Tracheophytes
- Clade: Angiosperms
- Clade: Eudicots
- Clade: Rosids
- Order: Sapindales
- Family: Anacardiaceae
- Genus: Toxicodendron
- Species: T. radicans

Binomial name
- Toxicodendron radicans (L.) Kuntze
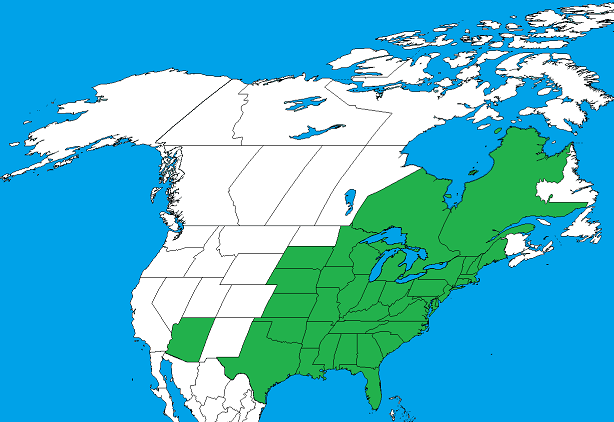
- Toxicodendron radicans range map in the United States and Canada

Synonyms
- Rhus radicans L.; Rhus verrucosa Scheele, syn of subsp. verrucosum

= Toxicodendron radicans =

Species of plant

Toxicodendron radicans, commonly known as eastern poison ivy or poison ivy, is a species of allergenic flowering plant. It has numerous subtaxons and forms both vines and shrubs. Despite its common name, it is not a true ivy, but rather a member of the cashew and sumac family, Anacardiaceae. It is different from western poison ivy, Toxicodendron rydbergii, and resembles a number of species.

The species is found in North America. Although commonly eaten by animals, with birds consuming the seeds, T. radicans is considered a noxious weed. As a poison ivy, it causes urushiol-induced contact dermatitis in most people who touch it, producing an itchy, irritating, and sometimes painful rash.

== Description ==
Numerous subspecies and/or varieties of T. radicans are known. They can be found growing in any of the following forms, all having woody stems:

- as a climbing vine that grows on trees or some other support
- as a shrub up to 1.2 metres (4 feet) tall
- as a trailing vine that is 10–25 centimetres (4–10 inches) long.

The deciduous leaves of T. radicans are trifoliate with three almond-shaped leaflets. The leaf color ranges from light green (usually when young) to dark green (in maturity), turning red, orange or yellow in fall; some sources say the leaves are also reddish when expanding (before becoming dark green). The leaflets are 3–12 cm (1 1/4–4 3/4 in) long, rarely up to 30 cm (12 in), and somewhat shiny in maturity. Each leaflet has a few or no teeth along its edge, and the leaf surface is smooth. Leaflet clusters are alternate on the vine, and the plant has no thorns. Vines growing on the trunk of a tree become firmly attached through numerous aerial rootlets. The vines develop adventitious roots, or the plant can spread from rhizomes or root crowns. The milky sap of poison ivy darkens after exposure to the air.

T. radicans spreads either vegetatively or sexually. It is dioecious; flowering occurs from May to July. The yellowish- or greenish-white flowers are typically inconspicuous and are located in clusters up to 8 cm (3 in) above the leaves. The berry-like fruit, a drupe, mature by August to November with a grayish-white colour.

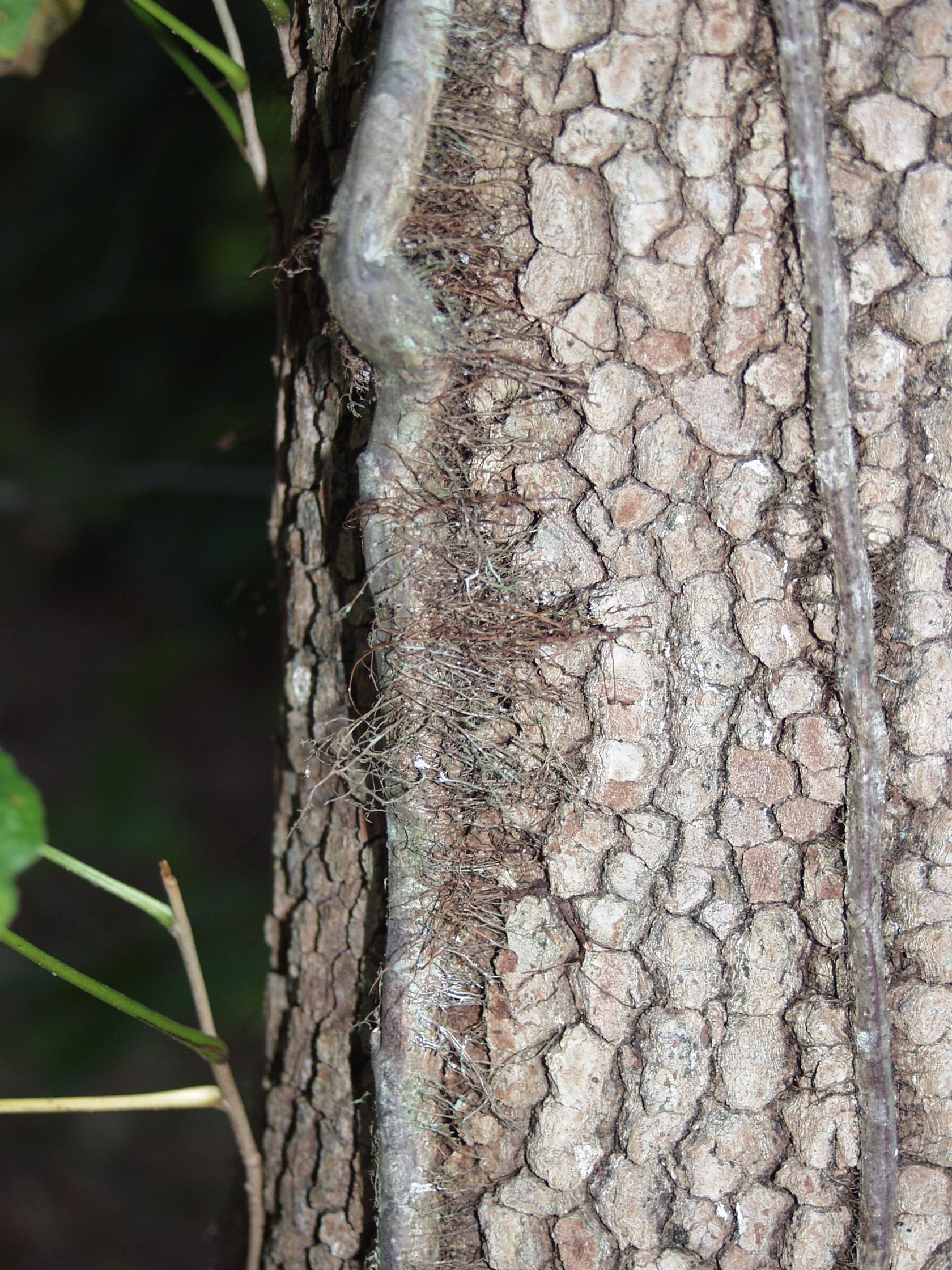
T. radicans vine with typical reddish "hairs"

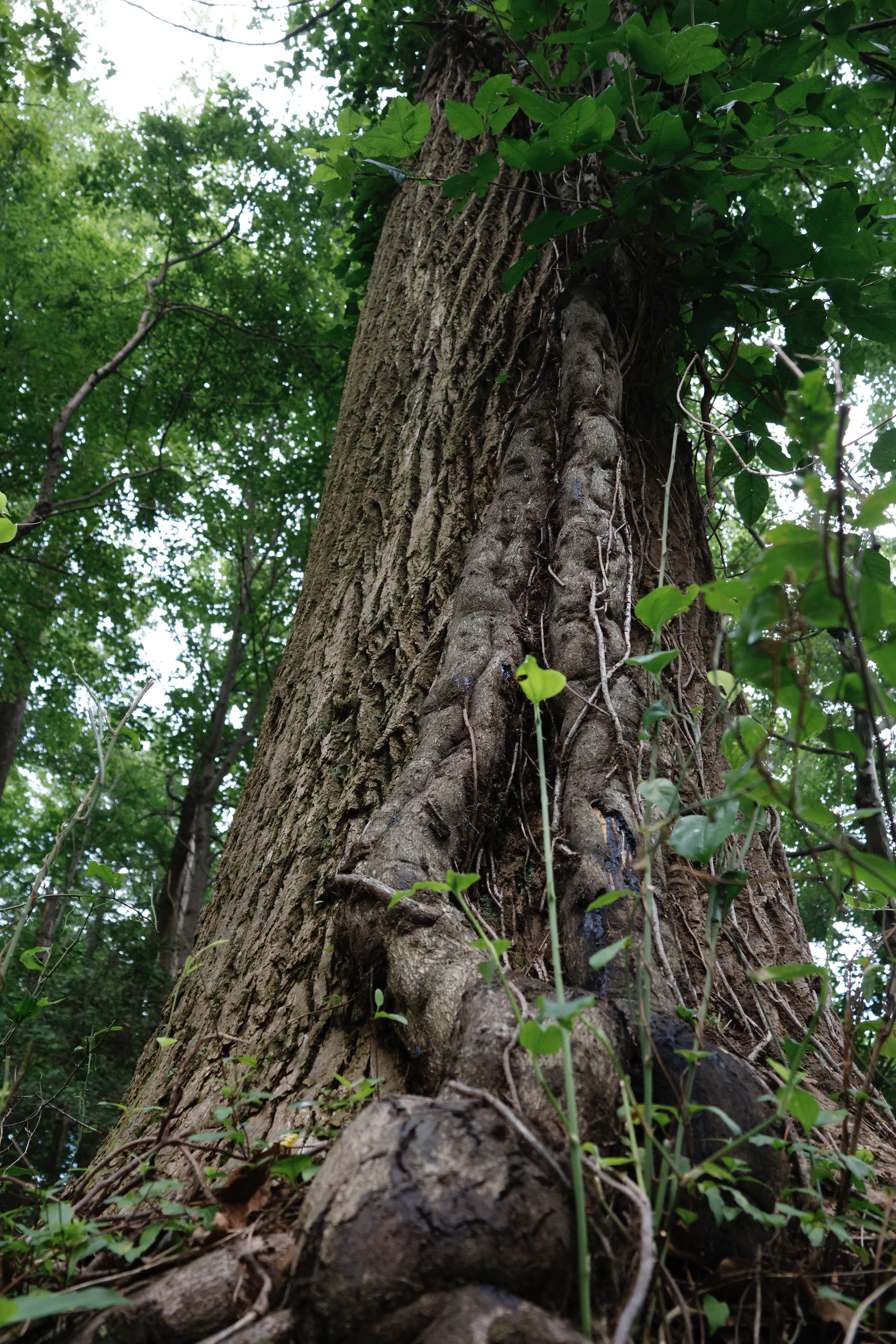
Trunk

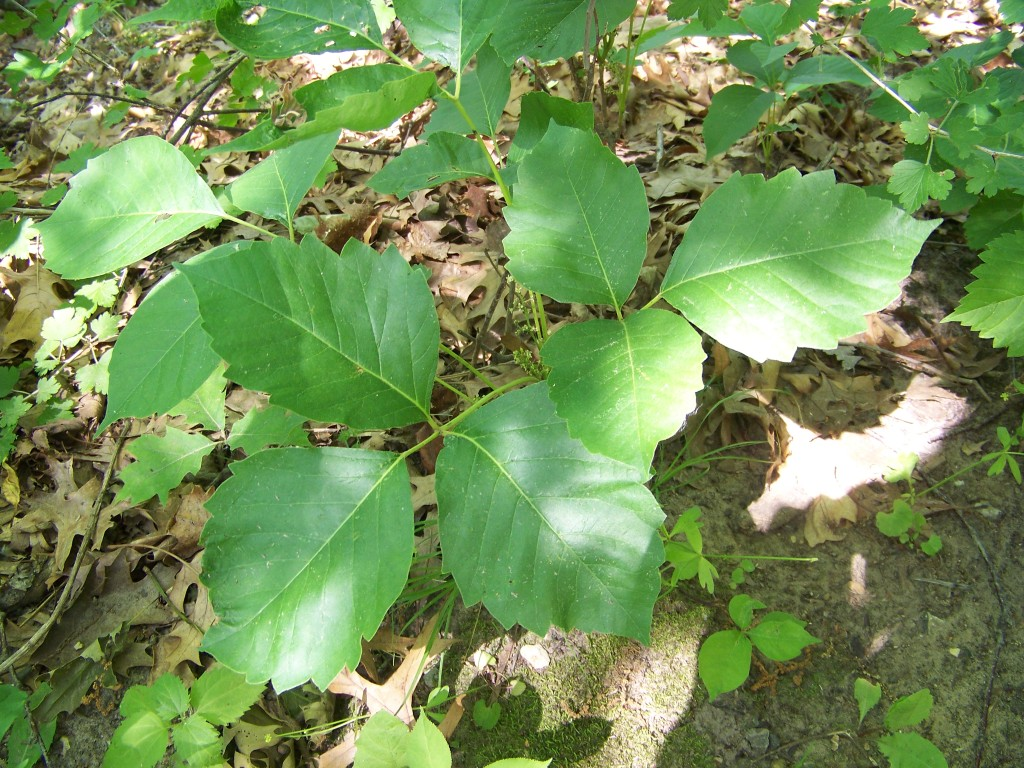
T. radicans in Wisconsin

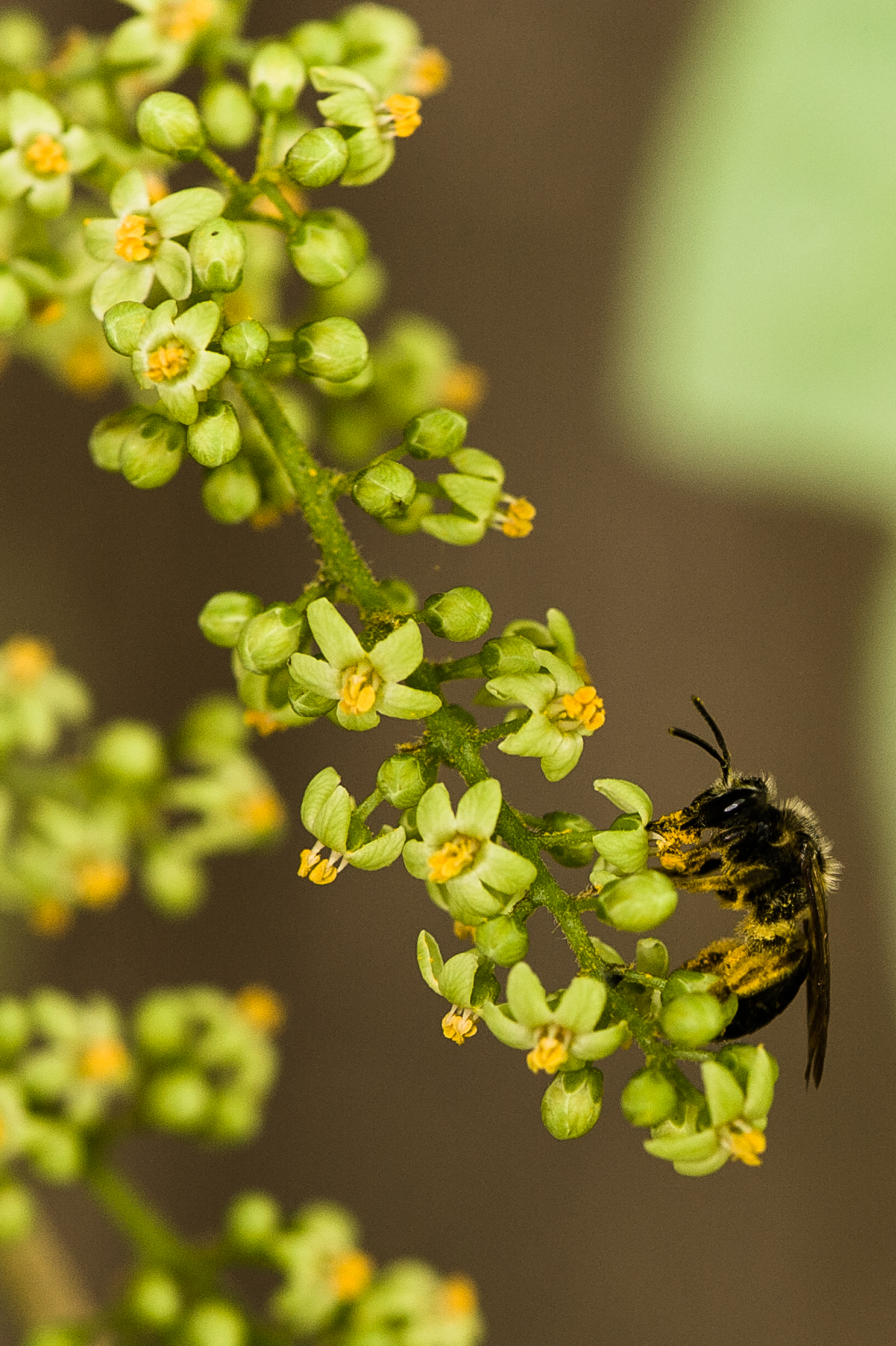
Flower detail, with bee

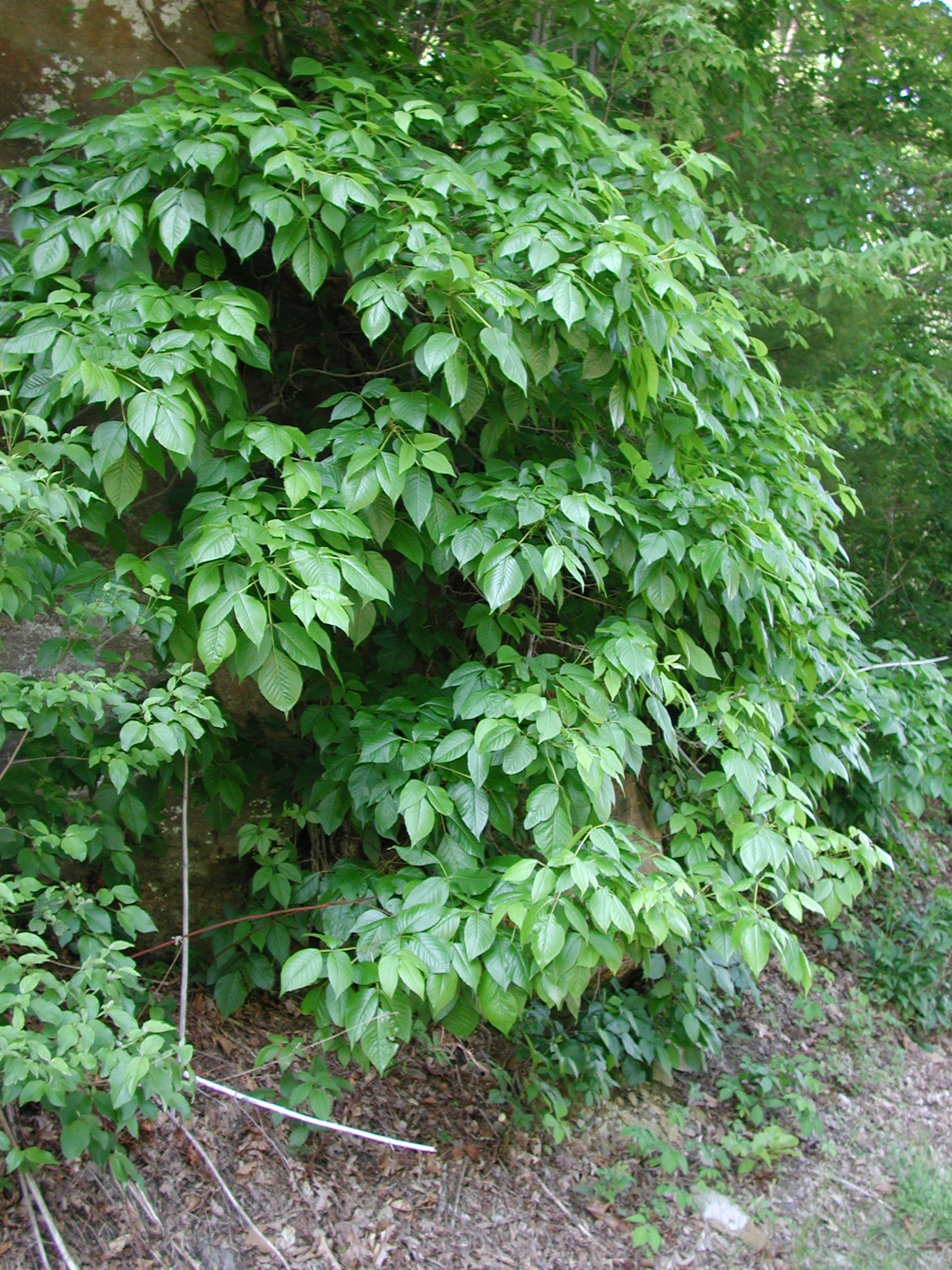
Poison ivy on a roadside

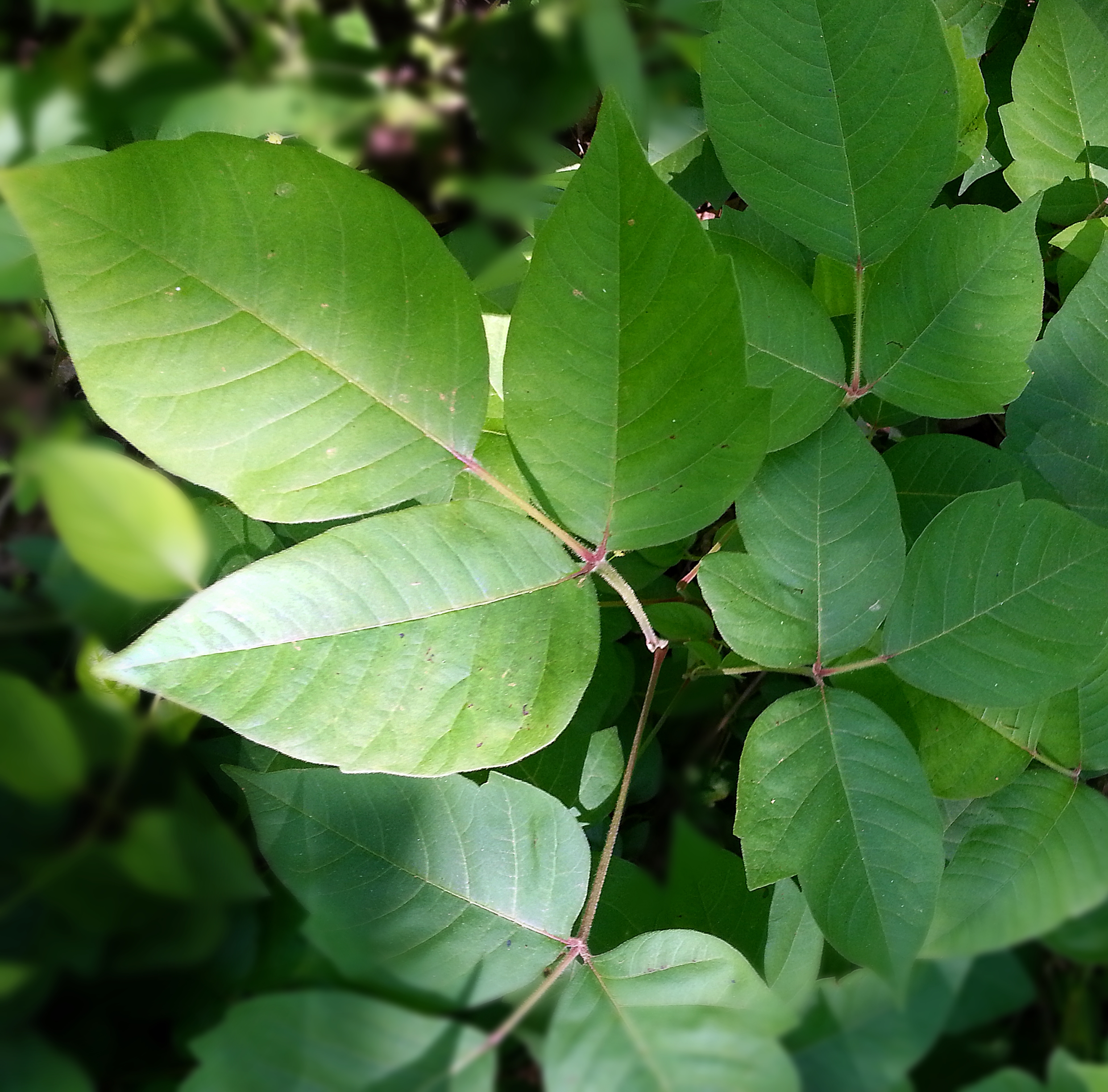
Smooth and notched leaves

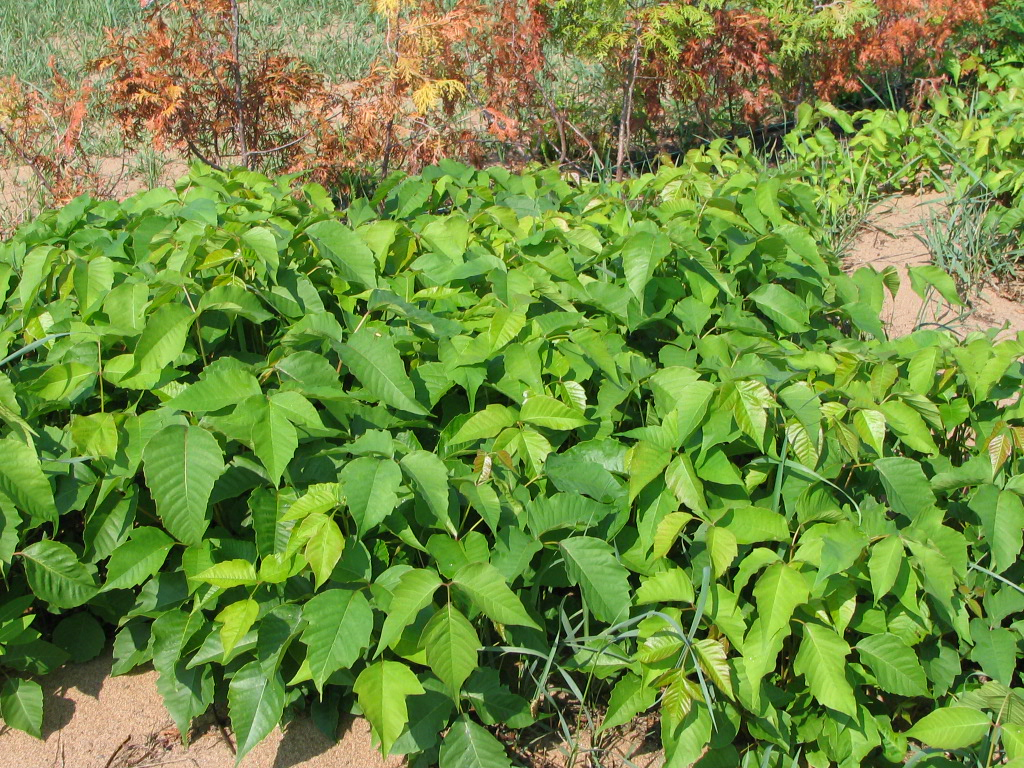
In Batiscan, Quebec

=== Identification ===
These four characteristics are sufficient to identify poison ivy in most situations: (a) clusters of three leaflets, (b) alternate leaf arrangement, (c) lack of thorns, and (d) each group of three leaflets grows on its own stem, which connects to the main vine, the middle stem is longer. The appearance of poison ivy can vary greatly among environments, and even within a large area. Identification by experienced people is often made difficult by leaf damage, the plant's leafless condition during winter, and unusual growth forms due to environmental or genetic factors. Various mnemonic rhymes describe the characteristic appearance of poison ivy:

1. "Leaves of three, let it be" is the best known and most useful cautionary rhyme. It applies to poison oak, as well as to poison ivy. However, some other innocuous plants have similar leaves.
2. "Hairy vine, no friend of mine"
3. "Berries white, run in fright" and "Berries white, danger in sight"
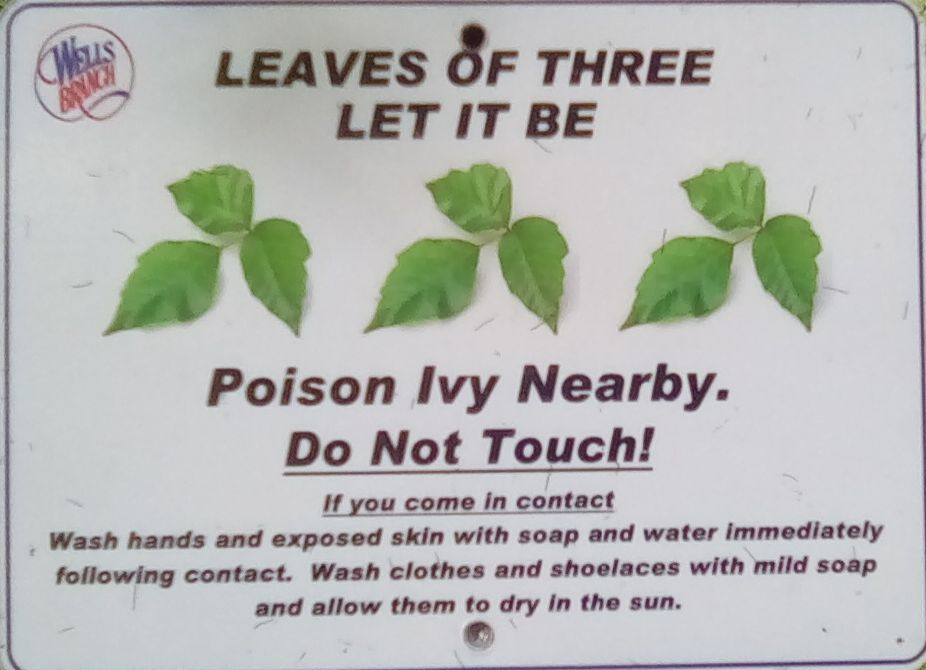
Poison ivy warning

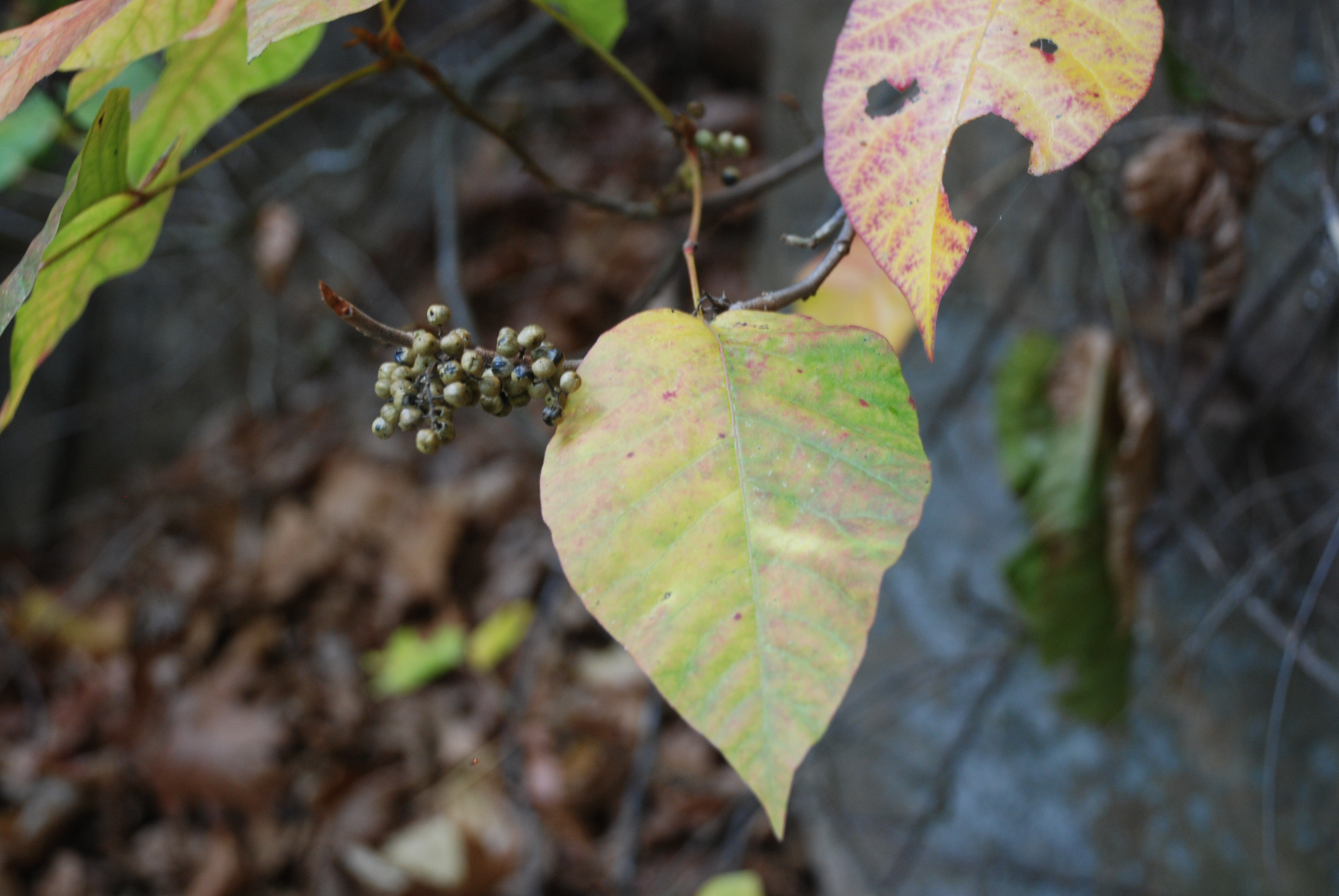
T. radicans leaf and berries

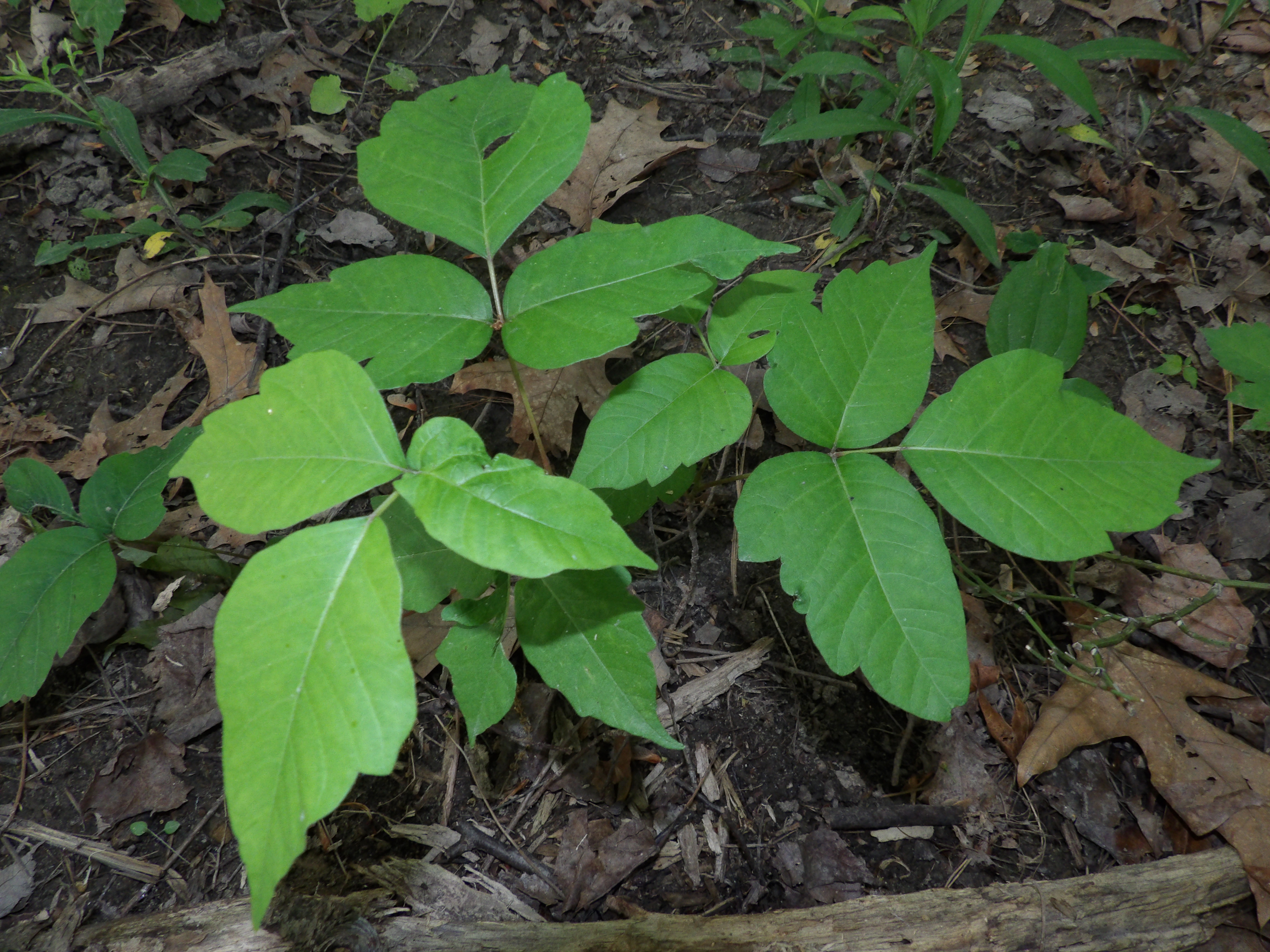
T. radicans foliage

==== Similar-looking plants ====
- Box elder (Acer negundo) saplings have leaves that can look very similar to those of poison ivy, although the symmetry of the plant itself is very different. While box elders often have five or seven leaflets, three leaflets are also common, especially on smaller saplings. The two can be differentiated by observing the placement of the leaves where the leaf stalk meets the main branch (where the three leaflets are attached). Poison ivy has alternate leaves, which means the three-leaflet leaves alternate along the main branch. Boxelder has opposite leaves; another leaf stalk directly on the opposite side is characteristic of box elder.
- Virgin's bower (Clematis virginiana) is a vine of the buttercup family native to eastern North America. This vine can climb up to 10–20 feet (3.0–6.1 m) tall. It grows on the edges of the woods, moist slopes, and fence rows, and in thickets and streambanks. It produces white, fragrant flowers about 1 inch (2.5 cm) in diameter between July and September.
- Virginia creeper (Parthenocissus quinquefolia) vines can look like poison ivy. The younger leaves can consist of three leaflets but have a few more serrations along the leaf edge, and the leaf surface is somewhat wrinkled. However, most Virginia creeper leaves have five leaflets. Virginia creeper and poison ivy very often grow together, even on the same tree. Even those who do not get an allergic reaction to poison ivy may be allergic to the oxalate crystals in Virginia creeper sap.
- Western poison oak (Toxicodendron diversilobum) leaflets also grow in threes on the end of a stem, but each leaflet is shaped somewhat like an oak leaf. Western poison oak grows only in western North America, although many people refer to poison ivy as poison oak, because poison ivy grows in either the ivy-like form or the brushy oak-like form depending on the moisture and brightness of its environment. The ivy form likes shady areas with only a little sun, tends to climb the trunks of trees, and can spread rapidly along the ground.
- Poison sumac (Toxicodendron vernix) has compound leaves with 7–15 leaflets. Poison sumac never has only three leaflets.
- Kudzu (Pueraria lobata) is a nontoxic edible vine that scrambles extensively over lower vegetation or grows high into trees. Kudzu is an invasive species in the southern United States. Like poison ivy, it has three leaflets, but the leaflets are bigger than those of poison ivy and are pubescent underneath with hairy margins.
- Blackberries and raspberries (Rubus spp.) can resemble poison ivy, with which they may share territory; however, blackberries and raspberries almost always have thorns on their stems, whereas poison ivy stems are smooth. Also, the three-leaflet pattern of some blackberry and raspberry leaves changes as the plant grows: Leaves produced later in the season have five leaflets rather than three. Blackberries and raspberries have many fine teeth along the leaf edge, the top surface of their leaves is very wrinkled where the veins are, and the bottom of the leaves is light minty-greenish white. Poison ivy is all green. The stem of poison ivy is brown and cylindrical, while blackberry and raspberry stems can be green, can be squared in cross-section, and can have prickles. Raspberries and blackberries are never truly vines; they do not attach to trees to support their stems.
- Strawberries (Fragaria), wild or cultivated, have trifoliate leaves and a red vine, and can be found in similar ecosystems. However, strawberry leaflets are serrated and have same-length petiolules. The stems also have small trichomes, which poison ivy lacks.
- The thick vines of riverbank grape (Vitis riparia), with no rootlets visible, differ from the vines of poison ivy, which have so many rootlets that the stem going up a tree looks furry. Riverbank grapevines are purplish in color, tend to hang away from their support trees, and have shreddy bark; poison ivy vines are brown, attached to their support trees, and do not have shreddy bark.
- Fragrant sumac (Rhus aromatica) has a very similar appearance to poison ivy. While both species have three leaflets, the center leaflet of poison ivy is on a long stalk, while the center leaflet of fragrant sumac does not have an obvious stalk. When crushed, fragrant sumac leaves have a fragrance similar to citrus, while poison ivy has little or no distinct fragrance. Fragrant sumac produces flowers before the leaves in spring, while poison ivy produces flowers after the leaves emerge. Flowers and fruits of fragrant sumac are at the end of the stem but occur along the middle of the stem of poison ivy. Fragrant sumac fruit ripens to a deep reddish color and is covered with tiny hairs, while poison ivy fruit is smooth and ripens to a whitish color.
- Hoptree (Ptelea trifoliata) has leaves that are remarkably similar. It is, however, a much larger plant, so confusion is unlikely for any but the smallest specimens. The flowers and seeds are also easily distinguished from those of poison ivy.

===== Similar allergenic plants =====
- Toxicodendron rydbergii (western poison ivy)
- Smodingium argutum (African poison ivy)
- Toxicodendron pubescens (poison oak – eastern)
- Toxicodendron diversilobum (poison oak – western)
- Toxicodendron vernix (poison sumac)
- Gluta spp (rengas tree)
- Toxicodendron vernicifluum (Japanese lacquer tree)
- Lithraea molleoides (aruera – South America)

== Taxonomy ==
Subspecies

- T. r. subsp. barkleyi Gillis
- T. r. subsp. divaricatum (Greene) Gillis
- T. r. subsp. eximium (Greene) Gillis
- T. r. subsp. hispidum (Greene) Gillis
- T. r. subsp. negundo (Greene) Gillis
- T. r. subsp. pubens (Engelm. ex S. Watson) Gillis
- T. r. subsp. radicans
- T. r. subsp. verrucosum (Scheele) Gillis

Caquistle or caxuistle is the Nahuatl term for the species.

== Distribution and habitat ==
T. radicans grows throughout much of North America, including the Canadian Maritime provinces, Quebec, Ontario, and all US states east of the Rocky Mountains, as well as in the mountainous areas of Mexico up to around 1,500 m (4,900 ft). It is normally found in wooded areas, especially along edge areas where the tree line breaks and allows sunshine to filter through. It also grows in exposed rocky areas, open fields, and disturbed areas.

It may grow as a forest understory plant, although it is only somewhat shade-tolerant. The plant is extremely common in suburban and exurban areas of New England, the Mid-Atlantic, and the Southeastern United States. The similar species T. diversilobum (western poison oak) and T. rydbergii (western poison ivy) are found in western North America, and T. orientale in Taiwan, Japan, Korea and Sakhalin.

T. radicans rarely grows at altitudes above 1,500 m (4,900 ft), although the altitude limit varies in different locations. The plants can grow as a shrub up to about 1.2 m (4 ft) tall, as a groundcover 10–25 cm (4–10 in) high, or as a climbing vine on various supports. Older vines on substantial supports send out lateral branches that may be mistaken for tree limbs at first glance.

It grows in a wide variety of soil types, and soil pH from 6.0 (acidic) to 7.9 (moderately alkaline). It is not particularly sensitive to soil moisture, although it does not grow in desert or arid conditions. It can grow in areas subject to seasonal flooding or brackish water.

It is more common now than when Europeans first arrived in North America. The development of real estate adjacent to wild, undeveloped land has engendered "edge effects", enabling poison ivy to form vast, lush colonies in these areas. It is listed as a noxious weed in the US states of Minnesota and Michigan and in the Canadian province of Ontario.

Poison ivy is particularly sensitive to carbon dioxide levels, greatly benefiting from higher concentrations in the atmosphere. Higher carbon dioxide levels increase the rate of plant growth, and cause them to produce more unsaturated urushiol, which causes stronger reactions in humans. Poison ivy's growth and potency has already doubled since the 1960s, and it could double again once carbon dioxide levels reach 560 ppm.

== Ecology ==
The fruits are a favorite winter food of some birds and other animals, including wild turkeys. Seeds are spread mainly by animals and remain viable after passing through the digestive tract. Birds may spread the seeds by regurgitation.

== Toxicity ==
A video describing the effects of poison ivy on the body

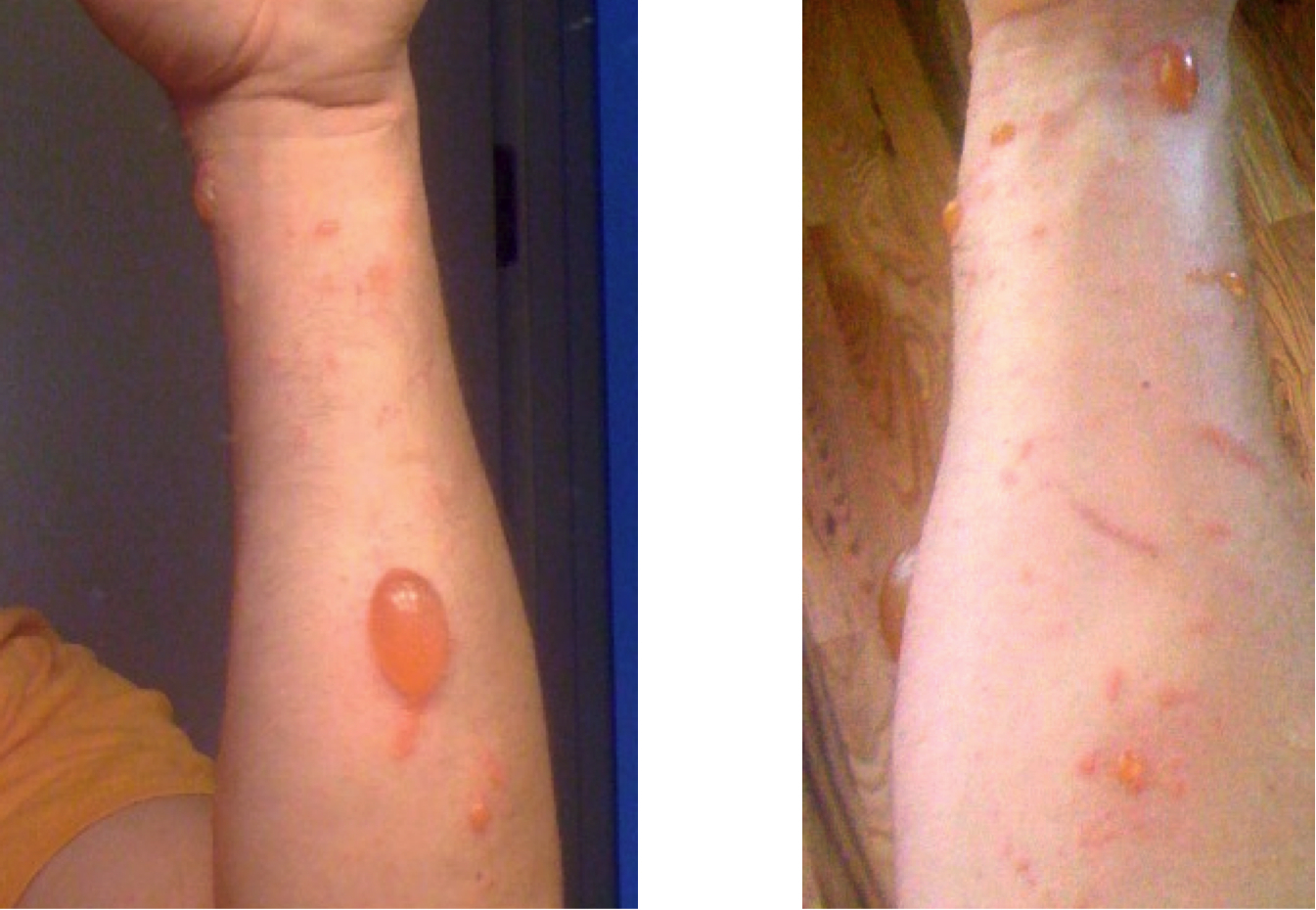
Blisters from contact with poison ivy

Urushiol-induced contact dermatitis is the allergic reaction caused by poison ivy. In extreme cases, a reaction can progress to anaphylaxis. Around 15 to 25 percent of people have no allergic reaction to urushiol, but most people have a greater reaction with repeated or more concentrated exposure. Typically, the rash from the urushiol oil lasts about five to twelve days, but in extreme cases, it can last a month or more.

Over 350,000 people are affected by urushiol annually in the US.

The pentadecyl catechols of the oleoresin within the sap of poison ivy and related plants causes the allergic reaction; the plants produce a mixture of pentadecylcatechols, which collectively is called urushiol. After injury, the sap leaks to the surface of the plant where the urushiol becomes a blackish lacquer after contact with oxygen.

Urushiol binds to the skin on contact, where it causes severe itching that develops into reddish inflammation or uncoloured bumps, and then blistering. These lesions may be treated with Calamine lotion, Burow's solution compresses, dedicated commercial poison ivy itch creams, or baths to relieve discomfort, though recent studies have shown some traditional medicines to be ineffective.

Over-the-counter products to ease itching—or simply oatmeal baths and baking soda—are recommended by dermatologists for the treatment of poison ivy. A plant-based remedy cited to counter urushiol-induced contact dermatitis is jewelweed, though jewelweed extracts had no positive effect in clinical studies. Others argue that prevention of lesions is easy if one practices effective washing, using plain soap, scrubbing with a washcloth, and rinsing three times within 2–8 hours of exposure.

The oozing fluids released by scratching blisters do not spread the poison. The fluid in the blisters is produced by the body and it is not urushiol itself. The appearance of a spreading rash indicates that some areas received more of the poison and reacted sooner than other areas or that contamination is still occurring from contact with objects to which the original poison was spread. Those affected can unknowingly spread the urushiol inside the house, on phones, doorknobs, couches, counters, desks, and so on, thus in fact repeatedly coming into contact with poison ivy and extending the length of time of the rash. If this has happened, wipe down the surfaces with bleach or a commercial urushiol removal agent. The blisters and oozing result from blood vessels that develop gaps and leak fluid through the skin; if the skin is cooled, the vessels constrict and leak less. If plant material with urushiol is burned and the smoke then inhaled, this rash will appear on the lining of the lungs, causing extreme pain and possibly fatal respiratory difficulty. If poison ivy is eaten, the mucous lining of the mouth and digestive tract can be damaged. An urushiol rash usually develops within a week of exposure and can last 1–4 weeks, depending on severity and treatment. In rare cases, urushiol reactions may require hospitalization.

Urushiol oil can remain active for several years, so handling dead leaves or vines can cause a reaction. In addition, oil transferred from the plant to other objects (such as pet fur) can cause the rash if it comes into contact with the skin. Clothing, tools, and other objects that have been exposed to oil should be washed to prevent further reactions.

=== Treatment ===
Immediate washing with soap and cold water or rubbing alcohol may help prevent a reaction. During a reaction, Calamine lotion or diphenhydramine may help mitigate symptoms. Corticosteroids, either applied to the skin or taken by mouth, may be appropriate in extreme cases. An astringent containing aluminum acetate (such as Burow's solution) may also provide relief and soothe the uncomfortable symptoms of the rash.

== See also ==
- Poison ivy rust
