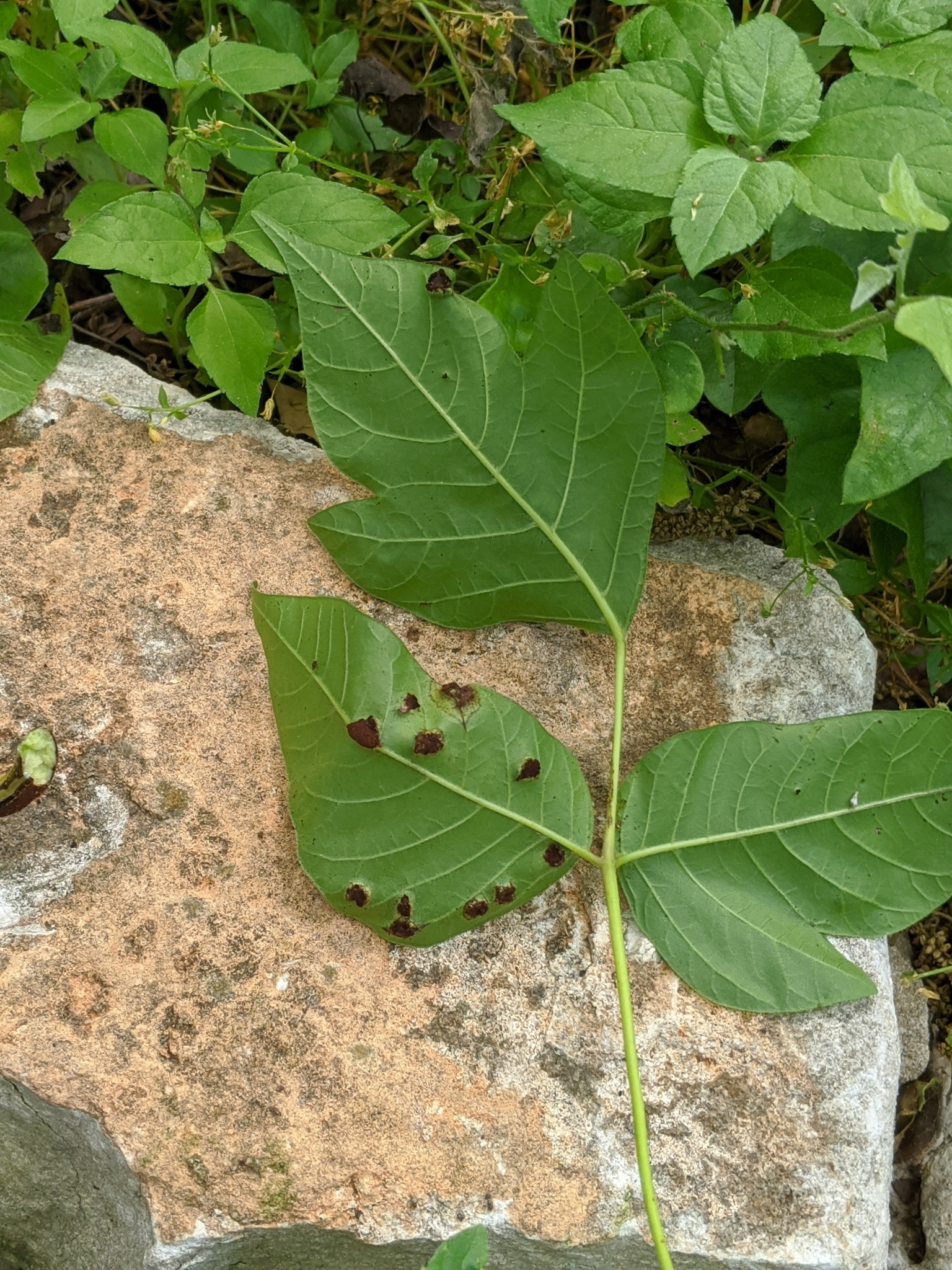
- Pileolaria brevipes on poison ivy

Scientific classification
- Domain: Eukaryota
- Kingdom: Fungi
- Division: Basidiomycota
- Class: Pucciniomycetes
- Order: Pucciniales
- Family: Pileolariaceae
- Genus: Pileolaria; Castagne

= Pileolaria (fungus) =

Genus of fungi

Pileolaria is a genus of autoecious rust fungi. They are considered plant pathogens and preferentially infect members of the sumac family.

== Selected species ==
There are about 20 species in Pileolaria.

- Pileolaria brevipes
- Pileolaria cotini-coggygyriae
- Pileolaria terebinthi
