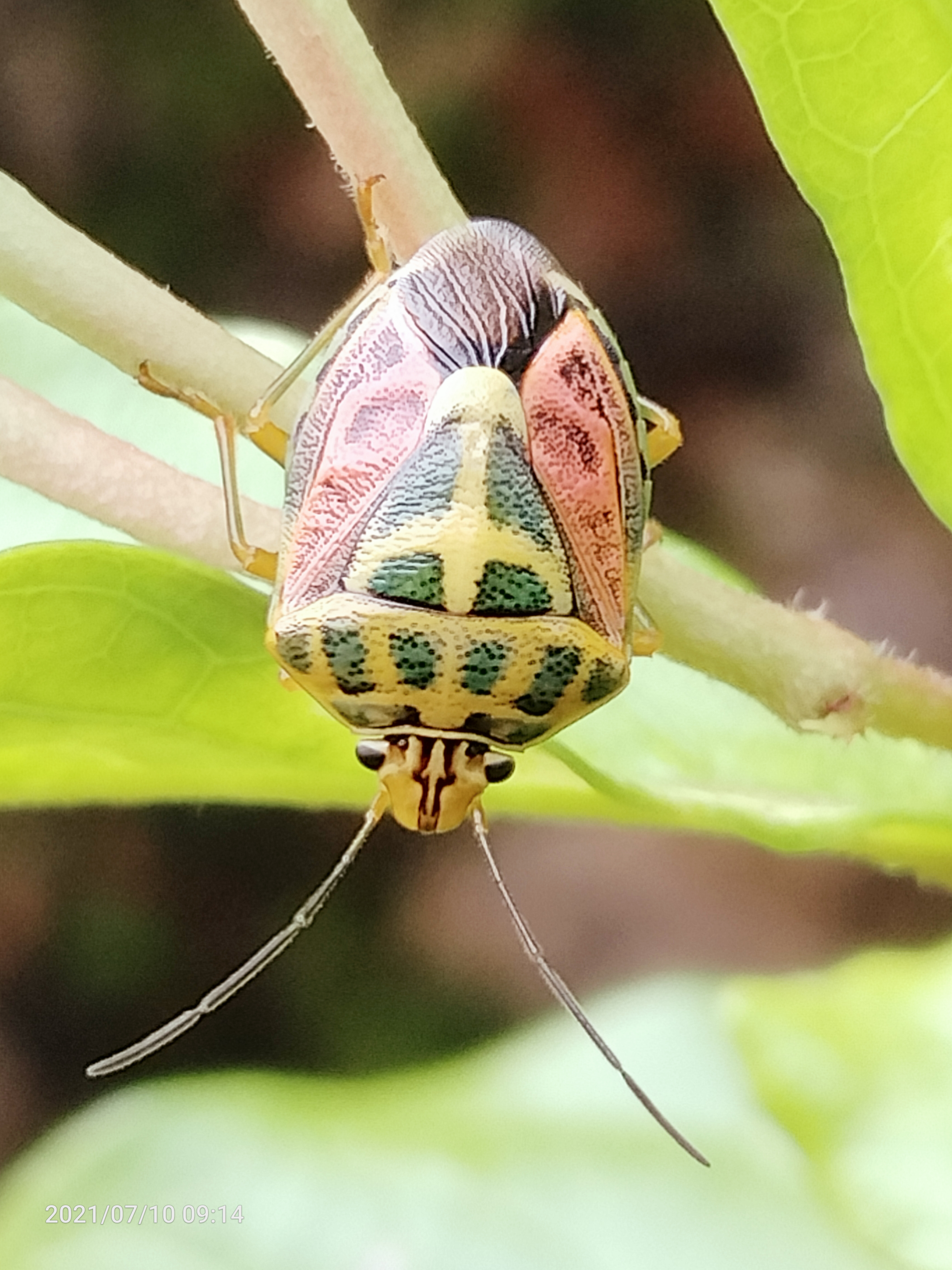

Scientific classification
- Domain: Eukaryota
- Kingdom: Animalia
- Phylum: Arthropoda
- Class: Insecta
- Order: Hemiptera
- Suborder: Heteroptera
- Family: Pentatomidae
- Genus: Antestiopsis
- Species: A. cruciata

Binomial name
- Antestiopsis cruciata (Fabricius, 1775)

Synonyms
- Antestia cruciata

= Antestiopsis cruciata =

Species of plant bug

Antestiopsis cruciata is a plant bug found in Asia. It sucks the sap of plants of a number of species including jasmine and coffee. They are considered minor pests in coffee cultivation where it is called the variegated coffee bug.

The pronotum has ten black spots, four small on the anterior margin and six behind them. The scutellum has four spots. The corium has three black spots and a costal black streak. The body and legs below are pale green or yellow. The antennae are greenish. The bug is about a centimeter long. A species of strepsiptera, Corioxenos raoi, is known to parasitize them.
