= Septoria pistaciae =

Scientific classification
- Kingdom: Fungi
- Division: Ascomycota
- Class: Dothideomycetes
- Order: Capnodiales
- Family: Mycosphaerellaceae
- Genus: Septoria
- Species: S. pistaciae

Binomial name
- Septoria pistaciae Desm. (1842)

Synonyms
- Cylindrosporium pistaciae (Desm.) Vassiljevsky, (1950); Phloeospora pistaciae (Desm.) Petr. (1922)

Species of fungus

Septoria pistaciae is a fungal plant pathogen infecting pistachios. It causes a disease known as septoria leaf spot in the leaves of pistachio, along with the related species Septoria pistaciarum and Septoria pistacina.
