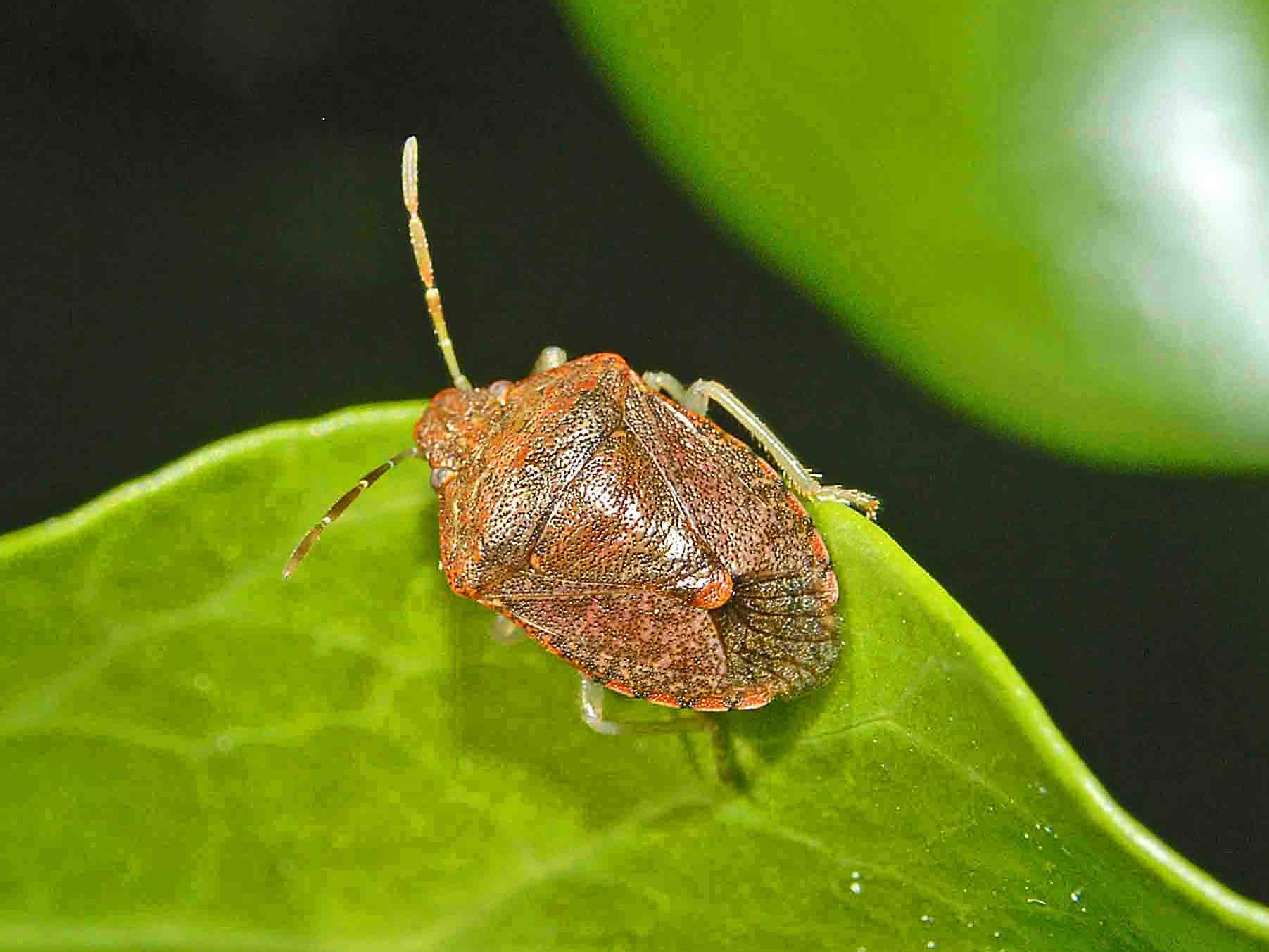
- Dryadocoris apicalis

Scientific classification
- Kingdom: Animalia
- Phylum: Arthropoda
- Class: Insecta
- Order: Hemiptera
- Suborder: Heteroptera
- Family: Pentatomidae
- Subfamily: Pentatominae
- Tribe: Antestiini
- Genus: Dryadocoris; Kirkaldy, 1909

= Dryadocoris =

Genus of true bugs

Dryadocoris is a genus of African and European shield bugs belonging to the family Pentatomidae.

== Species ==
- Dryadocoris apicalis (Herrich-Schaeffer, 1842)
- Dryadocoris breviceps Linnavuori, 1975
- Dryadocoris decipiens Linnavuori, 1975
- Dryadocoris distanti (Bergroth, 1892)
- Dryadocoris kenyalis Linnavuori, 1975
