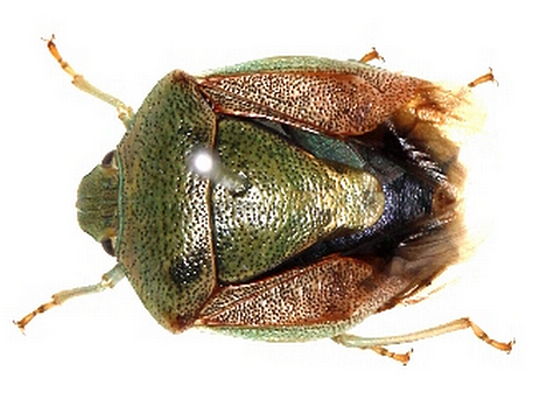

Scientific classification
- Kingdom: Animalia
- Phylum: Arthropoda
- Clade: Pancrustacea
- Class: Insecta
- Order: Hemiptera
- Suborder: Heteroptera
- Family: Pentatomidae
- Genus: Plautia
- Species: P. affinis

Binomial name
- Plautia affinis (Dallas, 1851)

= Plautia affinis =

Species of stink bug

Plautia affinis is a species of stink bug found mainly in Queensland and New South Wales, Australia. It was first described in 1851 as Pentatoma affinis by William Sweetland Dallas. It is small, bright green and has brown hemelytra.

== Range ==
Plautia affinis is found in all states and territories of Australia.
