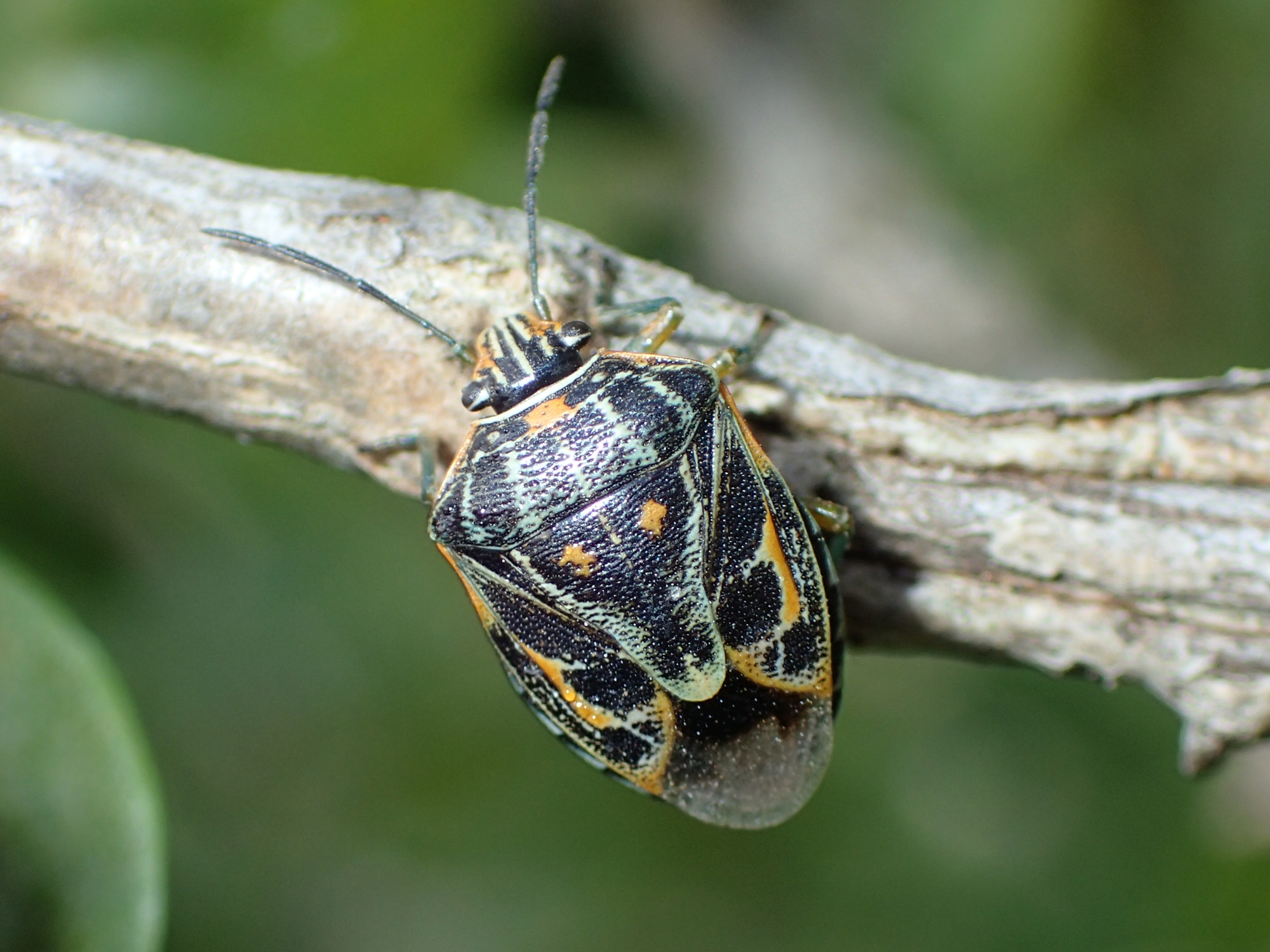
- Antestiopsis thunbergii

Scientific classification
- Kingdom: Animalia
- Phylum: Arthropoda
- Class: Insecta
- Order: Hemiptera
- Suborder: Heteroptera
- Family: Pentatomidae
- Subfamily: Pentatominae
- Tribe: Antestiini; Distant, 1902

= Antestiini =

Tribe of true bugs

The Antestiini are a tribe of shield-bugs, in the subfamily Pentatominae erected by William Lucas Distant in 1902. Genera are distributed from Africa to South-East Asia and Australia; in West Africa genera such as Antestiopsis are significant coffee pests.

== Species ==
The following are included in BioLib.cz:

1. Anaca Bergroth, 1891
2. Anaxilaus (bug) Stål, 1876
3. Antestia Stål, 1865 - type genus
4. Antestiella Linnavuori, 1975
5. Antestiopsis Leston, 1952
6. Bergrothina Schouteden, 1904
7. Birketsmithia Leston, 1956
8. Cnemobia Bergroth, 1910
9. Dryadantestia Linnavuori, 1982
10. Dryadocoris Kirkaldy, 1909
11. Eipeliella Schumacher, 1912
12. Eudryadocoris Linnavuori, 1975
13. Kilimacoris Jeannel, 1913
14. Millotia (bug) Cachan, 1952
15. Neoplautia Ahmad & Rana, 1981
16. Nimbocoris Villiers, 1959
17. Nkolbissonicoris Rider, 1998
18. Novatilla Distant, 1888
19. Obuducoris Linnavuori, 1982
20. Otantestia Breddin, 1900
21. Parantestia Linnavuori, 1973
22. Plautia Stål, 1864
23. Porphyroptera China, 1929
24. Socantestia Ribes & Schmitz, 1992
25. Starioides Matsumura, 1913
26. Tantesia Cachan, 1952
27. Zangiola Breddin, 1901
