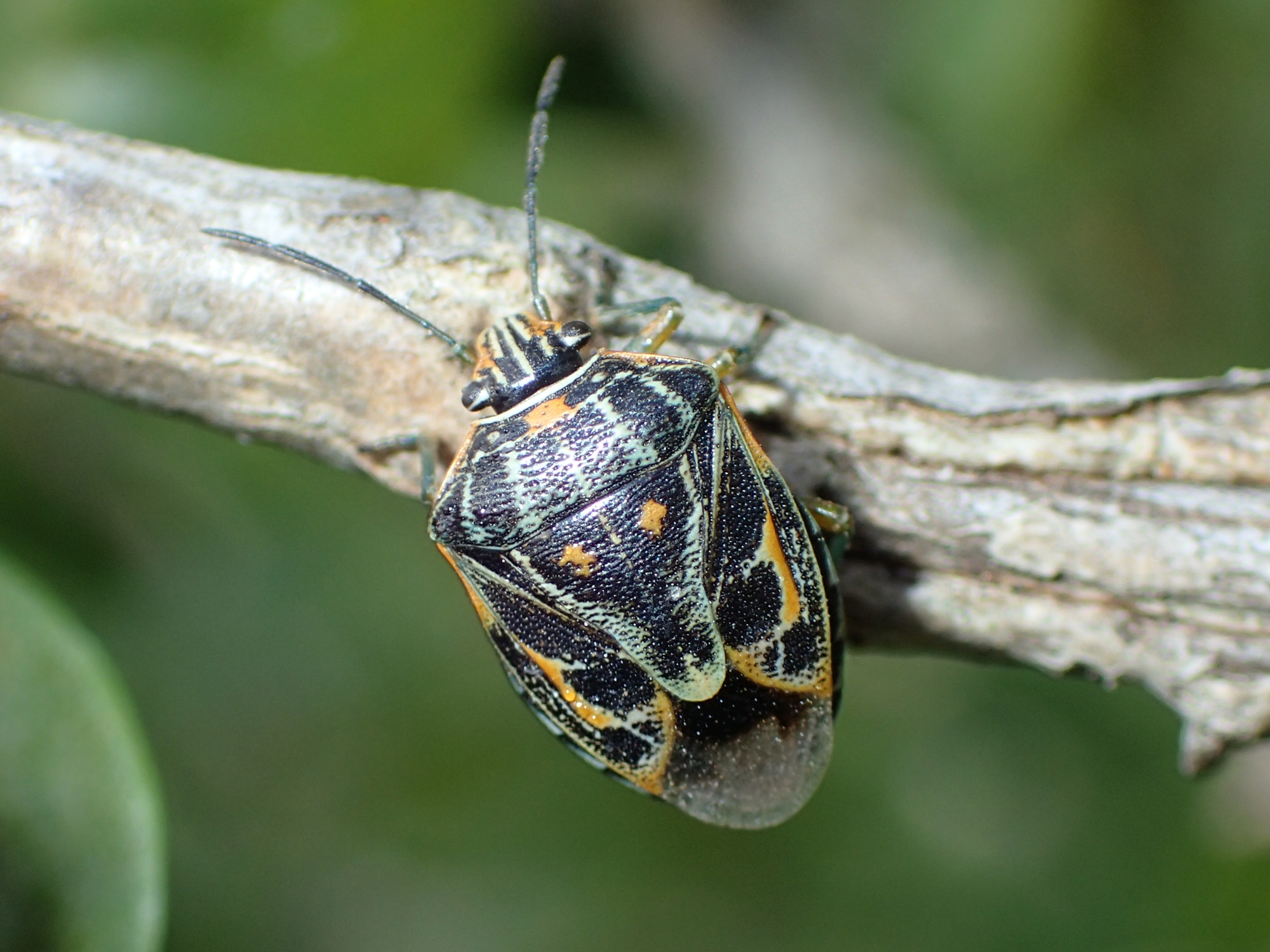
- Antestiopsis thunbergii in South Africa

Scientific classification
- Kingdom: Animalia
- Phylum: Arthropoda
- Clade: Pancrustacea
- Class: Insecta
- Order: Hemiptera
- Suborder: Heteroptera
- Family: Pentatomidae
- Tribe: Antestiini
- Genus: Antestiopsis; Leston, 1952

= Antestiopsis =

Genus of true bugs

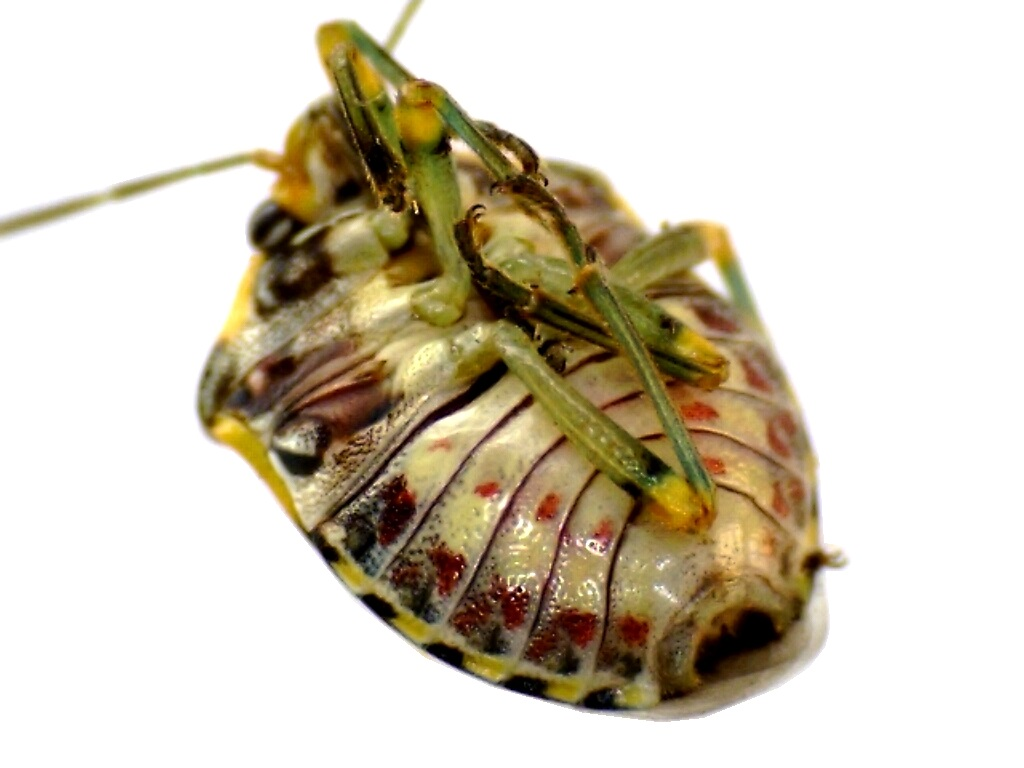
The underside of an unidentified Antestiopsis

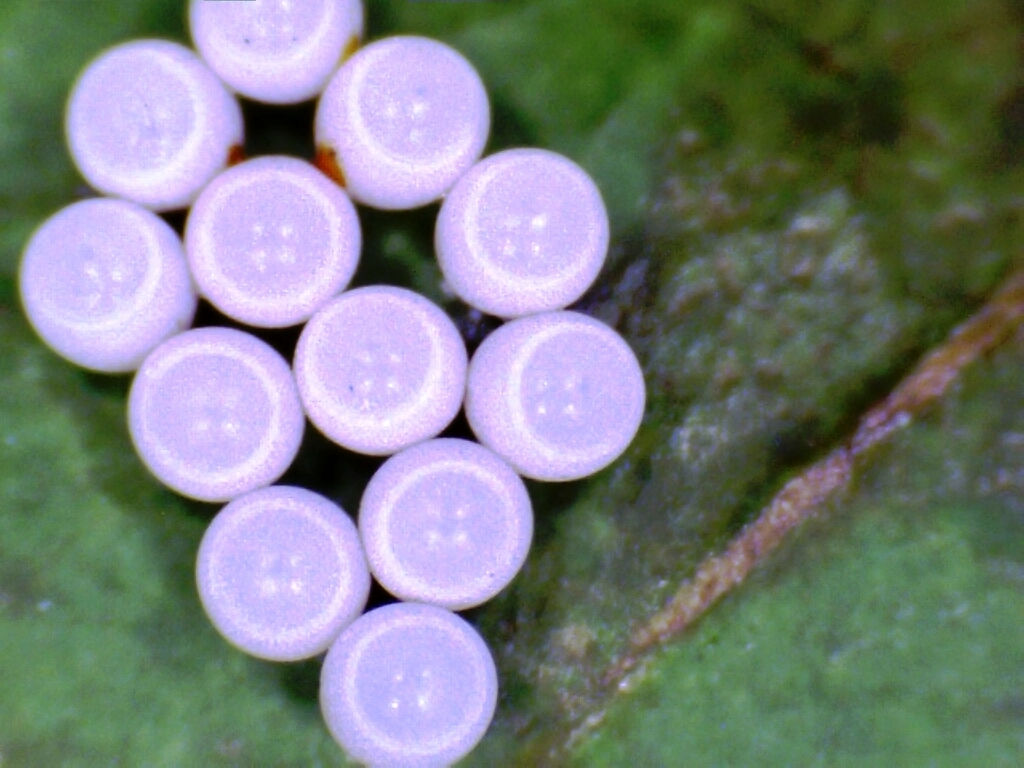
The eggs of an unidentified Antestiopsis

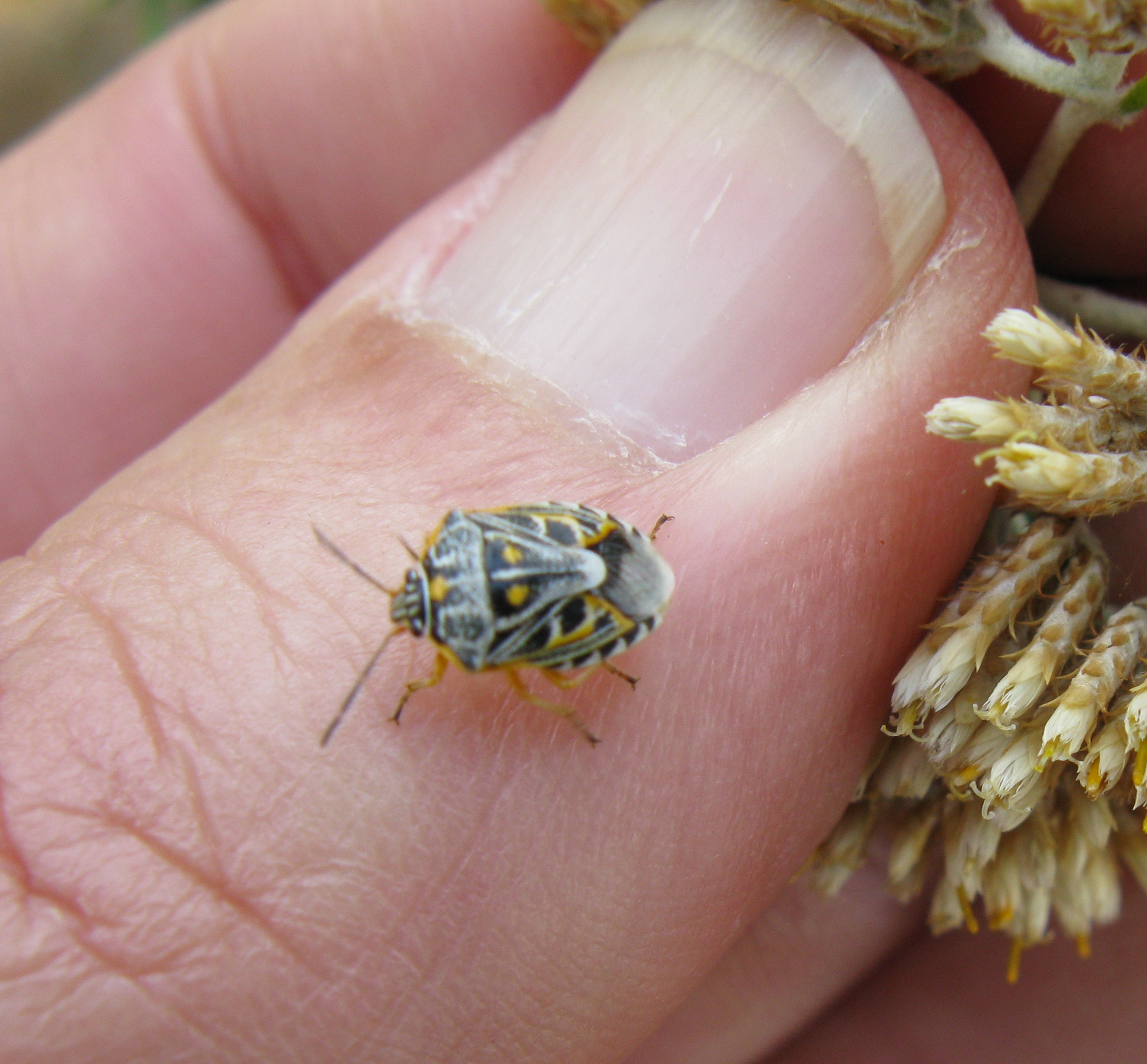
Antestiopsis thunbergii dorsal view of adult - the coloration of the species is very variable, but the general pattern is fairly consistent, e.g. the three conspicuous spots, one on the pronotum and two on the scutellum.

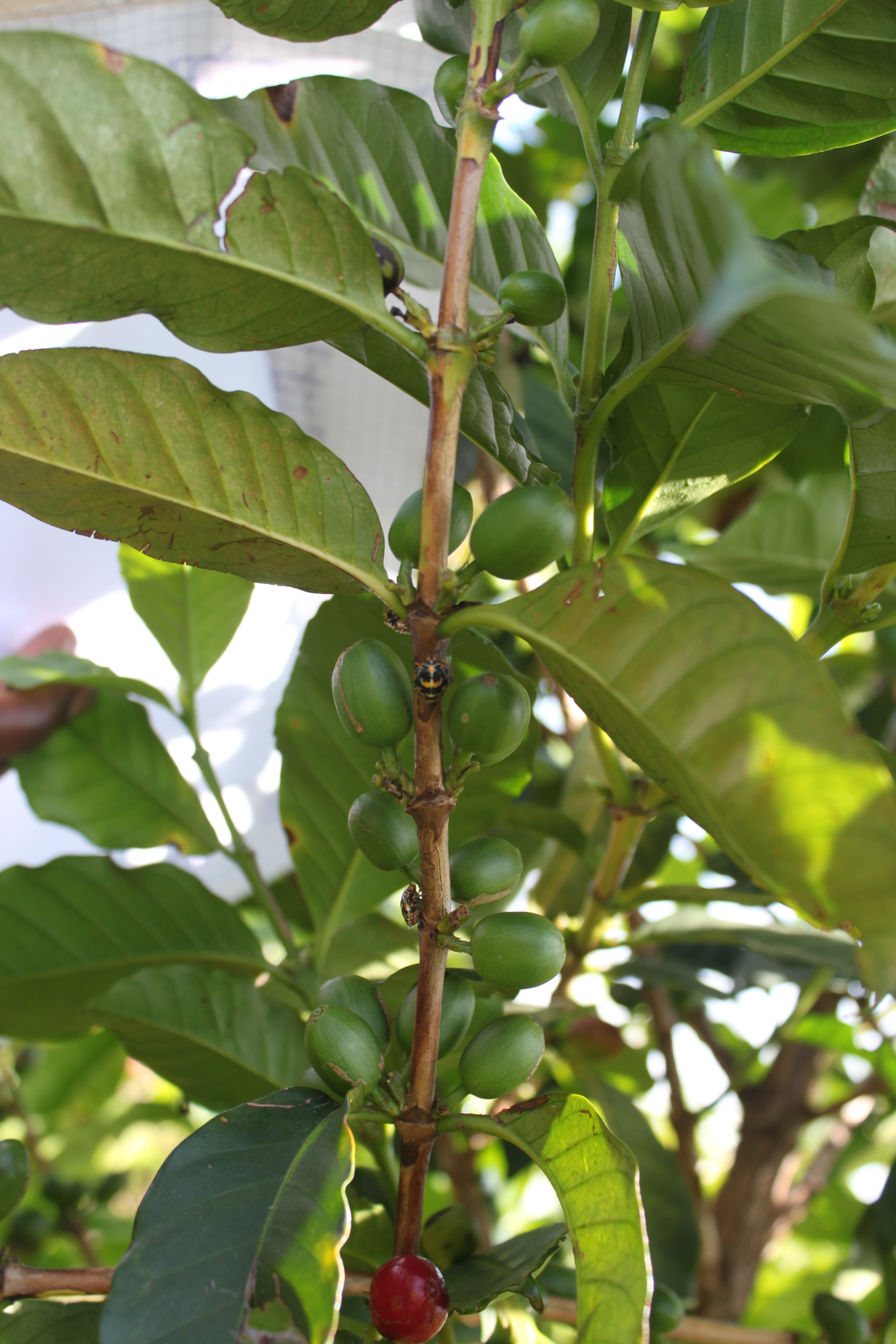
An antestia bug on a coffee tree

Antestiopsis is a genus of shield bug in the tribe Antestiini: commonly known as antestia or variegated coffee bugs. Several species in eastern Africa are pests of coffee plants, giving the coffee beans a distinctive 'potato taste'.

== Species ==
BioLib includes:

1. Antestiopsis anchora (Thunberg, 1783)
2. Antestiopsis cederwaldi (Bergroth, 1912)
3. Antestiopsis clymeneis (Kirkaldy, 1909)
4. Antestiopsis cruciata (Fabricius, 1775)
5. Antestiopsis crypta Greathead, 1966
6. Antestiopsis faceta (Germar, 1837)
7. Antestiopsis facetoides Greathead, 1966
8. Antestiopsis falsa (Schouteden, 1912)
9. Antestiopsis intricata (Ghesquierei & Carayon, 1948)
10. Antestiopsis lepelleyi Greathead, 1965
11. Antestiopsis lineaticollis (Stål, 1853)
12. Antestiopsis littoralis Greathead, 1965
13. Antestiopsis notia (Dallas, 1851)
14. Antestiopsis nuba Linnavuori, 1975
15. Antestiopsis orbitalis (Westwood, 1837)
16. Antestiopsis pallens Villiers, 1956
17. Antestiopsis rufovittata (Distant, 1910)
18. Antestiopsis thunbergii (Gmelin, 1790)
19. Antestiopsis transvaalia (Distant, 1892)

== Pest status and control ==
More than one species is known to be a pest of coffee crops, including A. orbitalis. The 'potato taste' caused by Antestiopsis attacks is thought to be caused indirectly by bacteria entering through wounds created by the insects, leading to an increase in the concentration of isopropyl methoxy pyrazine. They feed on flowers, berries and growing tips, injecting a toxic saliva that often contains the spores of the Ashbya fungus, and then suck juices out.

Historically, Antestiopsis has been controlled in Kenya using pyrethrum powder (and may still be used for organic production). Subsequently, the organophosphate fenthion was used to control the pest in Burundi, but this is no longer permitted for important markets such as the European Union.

Laboratory experiments have found the essential oils of Thymus vulgaris, Ruta chalepensis and Chenopodium ambrosioides cause around 90% mortality in Antestiopsis.
