= Pileolaria terebinthi =

Scientific classification
- Kingdom: Fungi
- Division: Basidiomycota
- Class: Pucciniomycetes
- Order: Pucciniales
- Family: Pileolariaceae
- Genus: Pileolaria
- Species: P. terebinthi

Binomial name
- Pileolaria terebinthi (DC.) Castagne, (1842)

Synonyms
- Uredo terebinthi DC., (1815); Uromyces terebinthi (DC.) G. Winter

Species of fungus

Pileolaria terebinthi is a plant pathogen infecting pistachio trees including Pistacia vera, Pistacia atlantica, and Pistacia terebinthus.
