= Stigmatomycosis =

Fungal disease affecting plants

- Causal agents: Ashbya gossypii, Eremothecium coryli, Aureobasidium pullulans
- Hosts: cotton, soybean, pecan, pomegranate, citrus, pistachio
- Vectors: hemipteran insects of the families Pentatomidae and Coreidae
- EPPO Code: NMATGO
- Distribution: Greece, Iran, Russia, California

Stigmatomycosis is a fungal disease that occurs in a number of crops, such as cotton, soybean, pecan, pomegranate, citrus, and pistachio. It has been reported on pistachio in Greece, Iran, Russia, and is frequently a problem in California pistachio orchards severely infested by hemipteran insects. In a 1989 survey in California, fruit with stigmatomycosis were found in 90% of samples collected from late June to mid-September and from all growing areas.

== Symptoms ==
Stigmatomycosis is characterized by a wet, smelly, rancid, slimy kernel. Kernels with stigmatomycosis can be 1) small, dark green and partially developed with a brown funiculus, 2) well-developed, dark green and rancid, or 3) full-sized but abnormal, being white or light yellow and jelly-like, with a lobed appearance. In contrast, symptoms of kernel necrosis, which is caused by large hemipterans, are dry, punky, brown areas in the kernel. Sometimes, kernel necrosis and stigmatomycosis symptoms can be present in the same fruit.

== Causal organisms ==
Stigmatomycosis is caused by the filamentous fungi Ashbya gossypii, Eremothecium coryli (syn. Nematospora coryli), and Aureobasidium pullulans. All of them belong to the phylum of ascomycetes

== Disease cycle and epidemiology ==
The fungi causing stigmatomycosis are associated with hemipteran insects of the stinkbug families Pentatomidae and Coreidae. Hemipterans are common pests in pistachio orchards, and up to ten species have been found in California pistachio orchards. Three common stinkbug pests, Thyanta pallidovirens (Western red-shouldered stinkbug), Chlorochroa uhleri, Chlorochroa ligata, and a leaffooted bug, Leptoglossus clypealis (Coreidae), experimentally transmitted E. coryli, which caused typical symptoms of stigmatomycosis in pistachio kernels. Symptoms first appear in late June after pistachio shells have hardened, but the disease becomes frequent in July through September, a period that coincides with kernel development. Smaller hemipterans, such as Lygus and Calocoris, may carry but not transmit the pathogens because they are unable to puncture the firm fruit pericarp after the second part of May. Stigmatomycosis and kernel necrosis are worse in orchards irrigated by sprinklers than in those irrigated by drip, microjets, or flood. This suggests either greater humidity requirements for infection, more activity of hemipterans in sprinkler-irrigated orchards, or more abundant pathogen propagules.

== Control ==
Fungicides do not control stigmatomycosis but insecticides reduce hemipteran vector populations and the incidence of stigmatomycosis.
