= Camarosporium pistaciae =

Scientific classification
- Kingdom: Fungi
- Division: Ascomycota
- Class: Dothideomycetes
- Order: Pleosporales
- Genus: Camarosporium
- Species: C. pistaciae

Binomial name
- Camarosporium pistaciae Zachos, (1974)

Species of fungus

Camarosporium pistaciae is a fungal plant pathogen that causes blight in pistachio shoots and panicles.
