= Eremothecium coryli =

Scientific classification
- Kingdom: Fungi
- Division: Ascomycota
- Class: Saccharomycetes
- Order: Saccharomycetales
- Family: Saccharomycetaceae
- Genus: Eremothecium
- Species: E. coryli

Binomial name
- Eremothecium coryli (Peglion) Kurtzman, 1995

Synonyms
- Nematospora coryli Peglion, 1901; Nematospora lycopersici A. Schneid., 1916; Nematospora phaseoli Wingard, 1922

Species of fungus

Eremothecium coryli (originally Nematospora coryli) is a plant pathogen that causes stigmatomycosis.

== Description ==
It is cultivated on potato dextrose agar and grows as yeast-like oval or spherical budding cells either isolated or in short chains and has few hyphae which are septate at maturity. In addition to buds, the yeast produces many asci (or sporiferous sacs or sporangia) that are cylindrical to naviculate, with two to eight needle-like ascospores arranged lengthwise. Ascospores are apiculate to fusiform, with a distinct septum at or near the center and the upper cell slightly broader at the septum, and after liberation are held together in a mass by long appendages. E. coryli colonies are creamy and perfectly round. The yeast grows at 10–37 °C, with an optimum range of 30–35 °C. More asci form at 15–20 °C than 25–35 °C.

== See also ==
- List of soybean diseases
