= Phomopsis cane and leaf spot =

Fungal plant disease

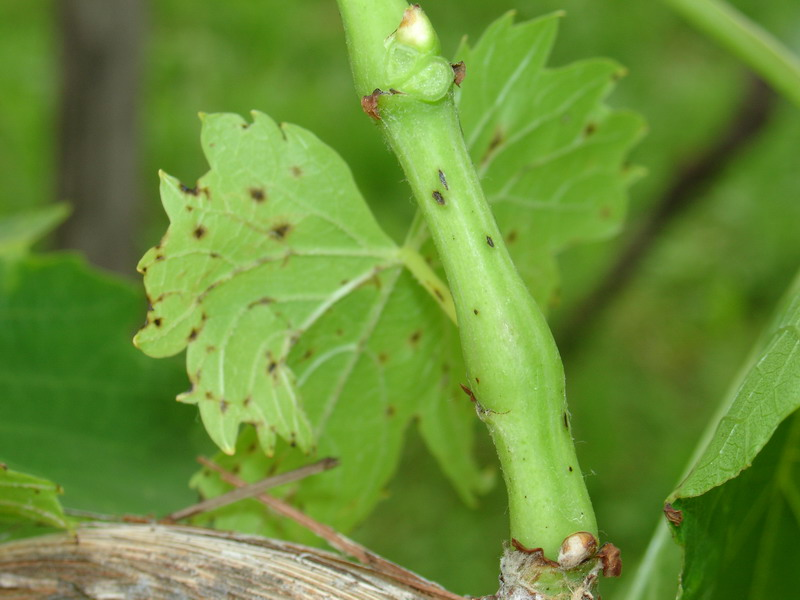
- Common names: Phomopsis cane and leaf spot
- Causal agents: Phomopsis viticola
- Hosts: Vine, Prunus, apples, pears, walnuts, pistachios
- EPPO Code: PHOPVI
- Distribution: Australia, United States, Canada, Japan, Sud Africa

Phomopsis cane and leaf spot occurs wherever grapes are grown. Phomopsis cane and leaf spot is more severe in grape-growing regions characterized by a humid temperate climate through the growing season. Crop losses up to 30% have been reported to be caused by Phomopsis cane and leaf spot.

== Hosts and symptoms ==
Phomopsis cane and leaf spot is a disease that causes symptoms in the common grapevine species, Vitis vinifera, in many regions of the world. This disease is mainly caused by the fungal pathogen, Phomopsis viticola, and is known to affect many cultivars of table grapes, such as Thompson Seedless, Red Globe, and Flame Seedless. Also in vines of oenological interest, such as Cabernet Sauvignon, Zinfandel, Syrah, Barbera, Chardonnay and Merlot. Spots or lesions on shoots and leaves are common symptoms of the disease. Small, black spots on the internodes at the base of developing shoots are probably the most common disease symptom. These spots are usually found on the first three to four basal internodes. The spots may develop into elliptical lesions that may grow together to form irregular, black, crusty areas. Under severe conditions, shoots may split and form longitudinal cracks. Although cane lesions often appear to result in little damage to the vines, it is important to remember that these lesions are the primary source of overwintering inoculum for the next growing season. Leaf infections first appear as small, light-green spots with irregular, occasionally star-shaped margins. Usually only the lower one to four leaves on a shoot are affected. In time, the spots become larger, turn black, and have a yellow margin . Leaves become distorted and die if large numbers of lesions develop. Infections of leaf petioles may cause leaves to turn yellow and fall off. All parts of the grape cluster (berries and rachises or cluster stems) are susceptible to infection throughout the growing season; however, most infections appear to occur early in the growing season. Lesions developing on the first one or two cluster stems (rachises) on a shoot may result in premature withering of the cluster stem. Infected clusters that survive until harvest often produce infected or poor-quality fruit. Soil moisture and temperature can impact the severity of symptoms, leading to a systemic infection in warm and wet conditions.

== Disease cycle ==
Phomopsis cane and leaf spot is caused by an ascomycete fungal plant pathogen. This pathogen produces sexual spores (ascospores) in the teleomorph stage and asexual spores (conidia) during the anamorph stage. Phomopsis (Sacc.) Bubák (teleomorph: Diaporthe Nitschke) is a cosmopolitan fungal genus that contains both plant pathogens and endophytes described from a wide range of annual and perennial hosts, including economically important crops.

The teleomorph stage of the disease cycle does not occur in nature and involves sexual combination of the antheridium with the ascogonium to produce ascospores, allowing for genetic variation. The ascospores are encased in an ascus, which is further protected in a survival structure called the perithecium. Ascospores can be dispersed over long distances in the wind, but can also be mechanically transmitted or disseminated in rain. The anamorph stage is known to occur in nature and produces the main inoculum associated with this plant pathogen. During favorable conditions, conidia are released from infected lesions on the leaves or fruit and dispersed to other plants through rainfall or wind. Pre-existing wounds on the plant from annual pruning or insects allow the pathogen to gain entry into the next plant. However, if wounds are not present, the conidia can germinate to produce an appressorium to directly penetrate the plant. Once new plants are infected, conidia are produced throughout the season as the secondary cycle of this polycyclic disease. Phomopsis viticola overwinters as pycnidia until favorable conditions arise again.

== Environment ==
The severity of Phomopsis cane and leaf spot in grapevine varies greatly between growing seasons. Fungal pathogens depend on moist conditions, causing the intensity of disease outbreaks to increase in wet environments. As the amount of rainfall changes between the seasons, so does the amount of pathogen present in the field. Prolonged rainfall early in the season has been correlated with greater disease outbreak. Temperature has also been shown to influence the infection rate. It has been found that the pathogen experiences the fastest rate of reproduction between 23 and 25 °C (73 and 77 °F). Although temperature is important, the amount of rainfall has a greater impact on this pathogen because rainfall is an effective method of conidial dispersal. The conidia of Phomopsis viticola can also be dispersed through sprinkler irrigation and agricultural runoff. It has not yet been determined if an insect vector for this pathogen exists.

== Treatment ==
Sulforix is recommended from delayed dormancy through to bud swell.

== Eutypa dieback ==
Eutypa dieback, also known as dead arm, is caused by Eutypa lata (synonym: Eutypa armeniacae) which infects fresh pruning wounds when there is adequate moisture on the vine, such as just after a rain. The fungus also attacks many other hosts such as cherry trees, most other Prunus species, as well as apples, pears and walnuts.

== See also ==
- List of apricot diseases
- List of pistachio diseases
