= Septoria pistaciarum =

Scientific classification
- Domain: Eukaryota
- Kingdom: Fungi
- Division: Ascomycota
- Class: Dothideomycetes
- Order: Capnodiales
- Family: Mycosphaerellaceae
- Genus: Septoria
- Species: S. pistaciarum

Binomial name
- Septoria pistaciarum Caracc.

Synonyms
- Asteromella pistaciarum Bremer & Petr.; Mycosphaerella pistaciarum Chitzan.

Species of fungal plant pathogen

Septoria pistaciarum is a species of fungus in the family Mycosphaerellaceae. It is a plant pathogen that infects the leaves of pistachio trees (Pistacia vera).

== See also ==
- List of pistachio diseases
