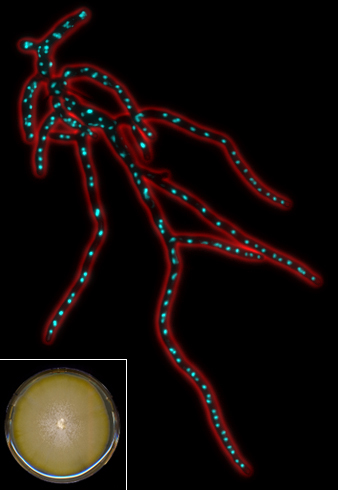
- Eremothecium gossypii

Scientific classification
- Domain: Eukaryota
- Kingdom: Fungi
- Division: Ascomycota
- Class: Saccharomycetes
- Order: Saccharomycetales
- Family: Saccharomycetaceae
- Genus: Eremothecium; Borzí

Type species
- Eremothecium cymbalariae Borzí

= Eremothecium =

Genus of fungi

Eremothecium is a genus of fungi in the family Dipodascaceae.
