= Eteoryctis deversa =

Scientific classification
- Kingdom: Animalia
- Phylum: Arthropoda
- Class: Insecta
- Order: Lepidoptera
- Family: Gracillariidae
- Genus: Eteoryctis
- Species: E. deversa

Binomial name
- Eteoryctis deversa (Meyrick, 1922)

Synonyms
- Acrocercops deversa Meyrick, 1922

Species of moth

Eteoryctis deversa is a moth of the family Gracillariidae and genus Eteoryctis. It is known to live in India (Meghalaya, Assam), Japan (Kyūshū, Shikoku, Hokkaidō, Honshū), Korea, the Russian Far East, and Taiwan.

Their wingspans range from is 6.5–10 mm.

E. deversa larvae feed on Mangifera indica, Rhus ambigua, Rhus chinensis, Rhus japonica, Rhus javanica, Rhus semialata, Toxicodendron orientale, Toxicodendron succedaneum, Toxicodendron sylvestre and Toxicodendron trichocarpum. They probably mine the leaves of their host plant.
