= Caloptilia protiella =

Scientific classification
- Domain: Eukaryota
- Kingdom: Animalia
- Phylum: Arthropoda
- Class: Insecta
- Order: Lepidoptera
- Family: Gracillariidae
- Genus: Caloptilia
- Species: C. protiella

Binomial name
- Caloptilia protiella (Deventer, 1904)

Synonyms
- Gracilaria protiella Deventer, 1904; Gracilaria corollata Meyrick, 1933; Caloptilia Timodora elongata Kumata, 1982

Species of moth

Caloptilia protiella is a moth of the family Gracillariidae. It is known from China (Hong Kong, Guangdong, Jiangxi and Hainan), India, Java, Japan (Kyūshū and the Ryukyu Islands), Malaysia and Thailand.

The wingspan is 10.5-12.5 mm.

The larvae feed on Anacardium occidentale, Toxicodendron succedaneum, Toxicodendron sylvestre and Protium javanicum. They probably mine the leaves of their host plant.
