= R. sylvestris =

R. sylvestris may refer to:

- Rorippa sylvestris, the creeping yellowcress, keek, yellow fieldcress, a plant invasive species
- Rhus sylvestris, a synonym for Toxicodendron sylvestre, a plant species in the genus Toxicodendron found in China, Japan, Korea and Taiwan
