= Tang Chunfu =

Chinese artist (born 1952)

- 汤春甫
- Born: September 1952 (age 74); Tiantai County, Zhejiang, China
- Known for: Buddhist sculpture; dry lacquer

Tang Chunfu (汤春甫; born September 1952) is a Chinese artist from Tiantai County, Zhejiang. He holds the title of China Arts and Crafts Master and was included in the fourth group of national representative bearers of intangible cultural heritage for the dry lacquer tradition of Tiantai Mountain (干漆夹苎; pinyin: gānqī jiāzhù). The craft uses lacquer and ramie cloth and is employed in Buddhist sculpture.

== Biography ==
At the age of 12, Tang learned the dry lacquer technique for making Buddhist sculptures from Shi Guanghong, a monk and craftsman at Huading Temple on Tiantai Mountain. He later visited the Yungang Grottoes, Mogao Caves and Maijishan Grottoes to study Buddhist sculpture.
