= Caloptilia aurifasciata =

Scientific classification
- Kingdom: Animalia
- Phylum: Arthropoda
- Class: Insecta
- Order: Lepidoptera
- Family: Gracillariidae
- Genus: Caloptilia
- Species: C. aurifasciata

Binomial name
- Caloptilia aurifasciata Kumata, 1982

Species of moth

Caloptilia aurifasciata is a moth of the family Gracillariidae. It is known from China (Hainan, Guanxi, Fujian, Zhejiang), Hong Kong, Japan (Honshū, Kyūshū, Shikoku), Malaysia (West Malaysia) and Thailand.

The wingspan is 9.8–11 mm.

The larvae feed on Toxicodendron succedaneum and Toxicodendron sylvestre. They mine the leaves of their host plant.
