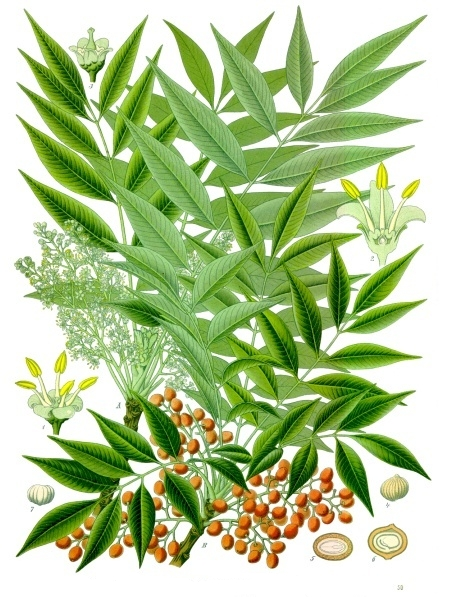
- Köhler's Medicinal Plants plate 272

Scientific classification
- Kingdom: Plantae
- Clade: Tracheophytes
- Clade: Angiosperms
- Clade: Eudicots
- Clade: Rosids
- Order: Sapindales
- Family: Anacardiaceae
- Genus: Toxicodendron
- Species: T. succedaneum

Binomial name
- Toxicodendron succedaneum (L.) Kuntze, 1891

Synonyms
- Rhus succedanea L.

= Toxicodendron succedaneum =

Species of flowering plant

Toxicodendron succedaneum, the wax tree, Japanese Hazenoki tree (Sumac or wax tree), sơn in Vietnamese or charão in Portuguese, is a flowering plant species in the genus Toxicodendron found in Asia, although it has been planted elsewhere, most notably Australia and New Zealand. It is a large shrub or tree, up to 8 m tall, somewhat similar to a sumac tree. Because of its beautiful autumn foliage, it has been planted outside Asia as an ornamental plant, often by gardeners who were apparently unaware of the dangers of allergic reactions. It is now officially classified as a noxious weed in Australia and New Zealand. It is one of the city tree symbols of Kurume, Fukuoka, Japan.

The larvae of the moths Eteoryctis deversa, Caloptilia aurifasciata, Caloptilia protiella, Caloptilia rhois, and Callidrepana patrana feed on T. succedaneum.

== Chemistry ==
The plant produces hinokiflavone, a cytotoxic biflavonoid. Its stems are also a commercial source of fisetin, extracted in China.

== Uses ==
It is used to produce lacquer. In Vietnam, lacquer is used to produce lacquer paintings, known as sơn mài, from resin of the tree.

In East Asia, in particular in Japan, traditional candle fuel (also called Japan wax) was produced, among other sumac plants, from Toxicodendron succedaneum crushed fruits rather than beeswax or animal fats. Japan's wax is a byproduct of lacquer manufacture. It is not a true wax but a fat that contains 10–15% palmitin, stearin, and olein with about 1% japanic acid (1,21-heneicosanedioic acid). Japan wax is sold in flat squares or disks and has a rancid odor. It is extracted by expression, heat, or the action of solvents. The fatty-acid methyl ester of the kernel oil meets all of the major biodiesel requirements in the USA (ASTM D 6751-02, ASTM PS 121-99), Germany (DIN V 51606), and the European Union (EN 14214).

It is used as a medicinal plant in India.

The fruits are edible, though their consumption is not recommended because of the general toxicity of the plant.

== Images gallery ==
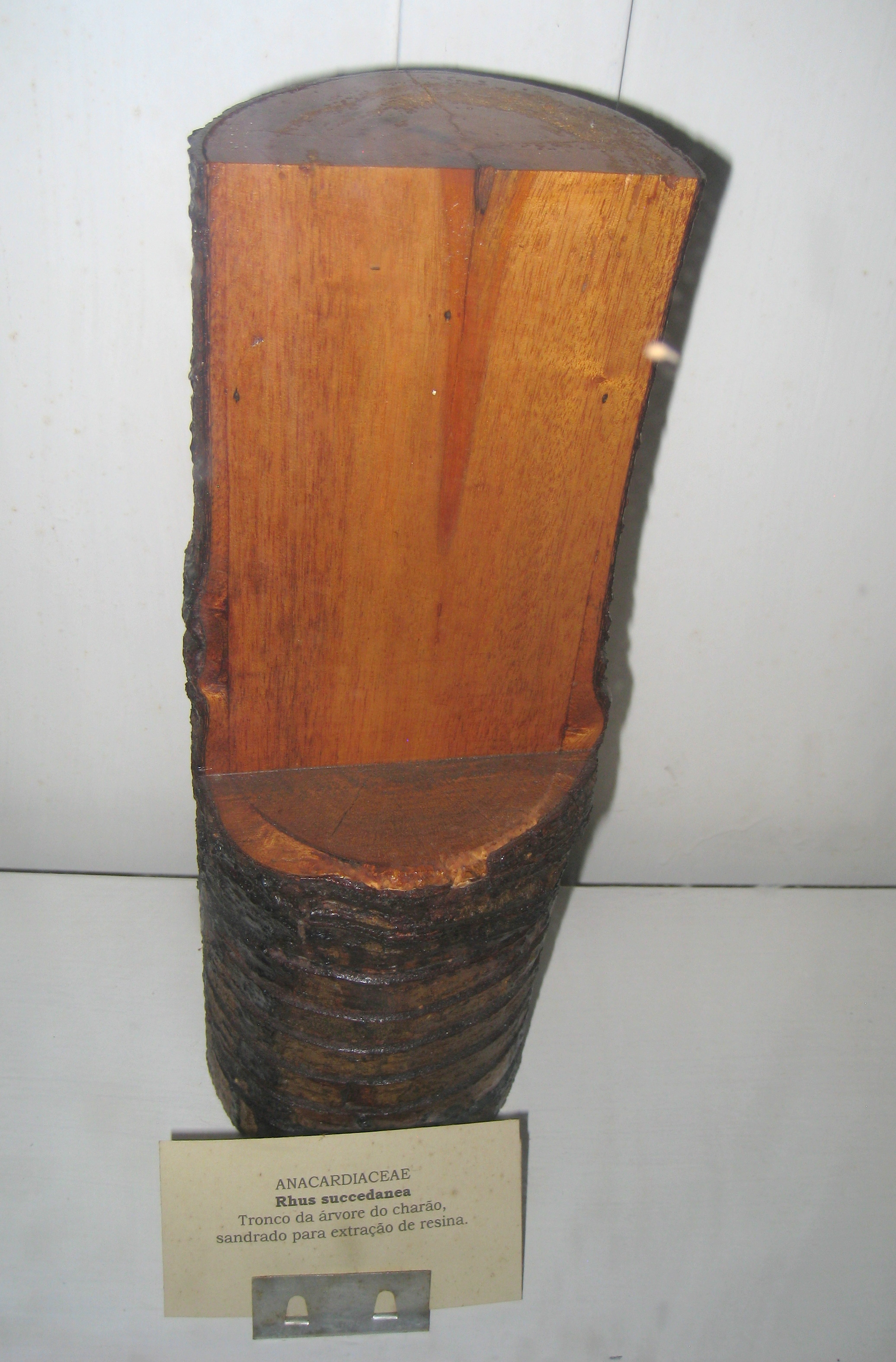
Wood sample at Jardim Botânico, São Paulo, Brazil

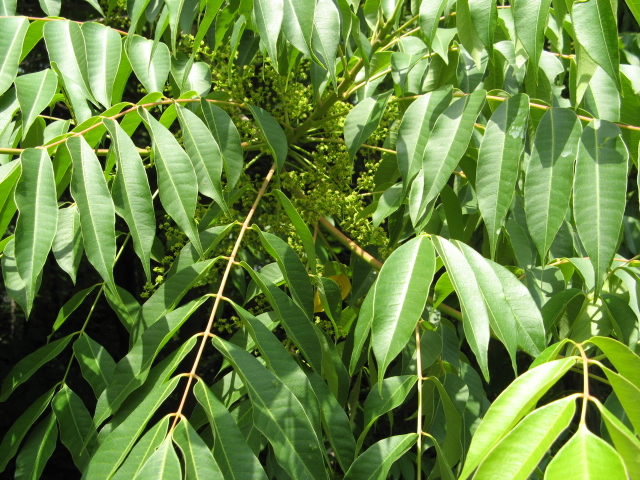
Leaves and flowers

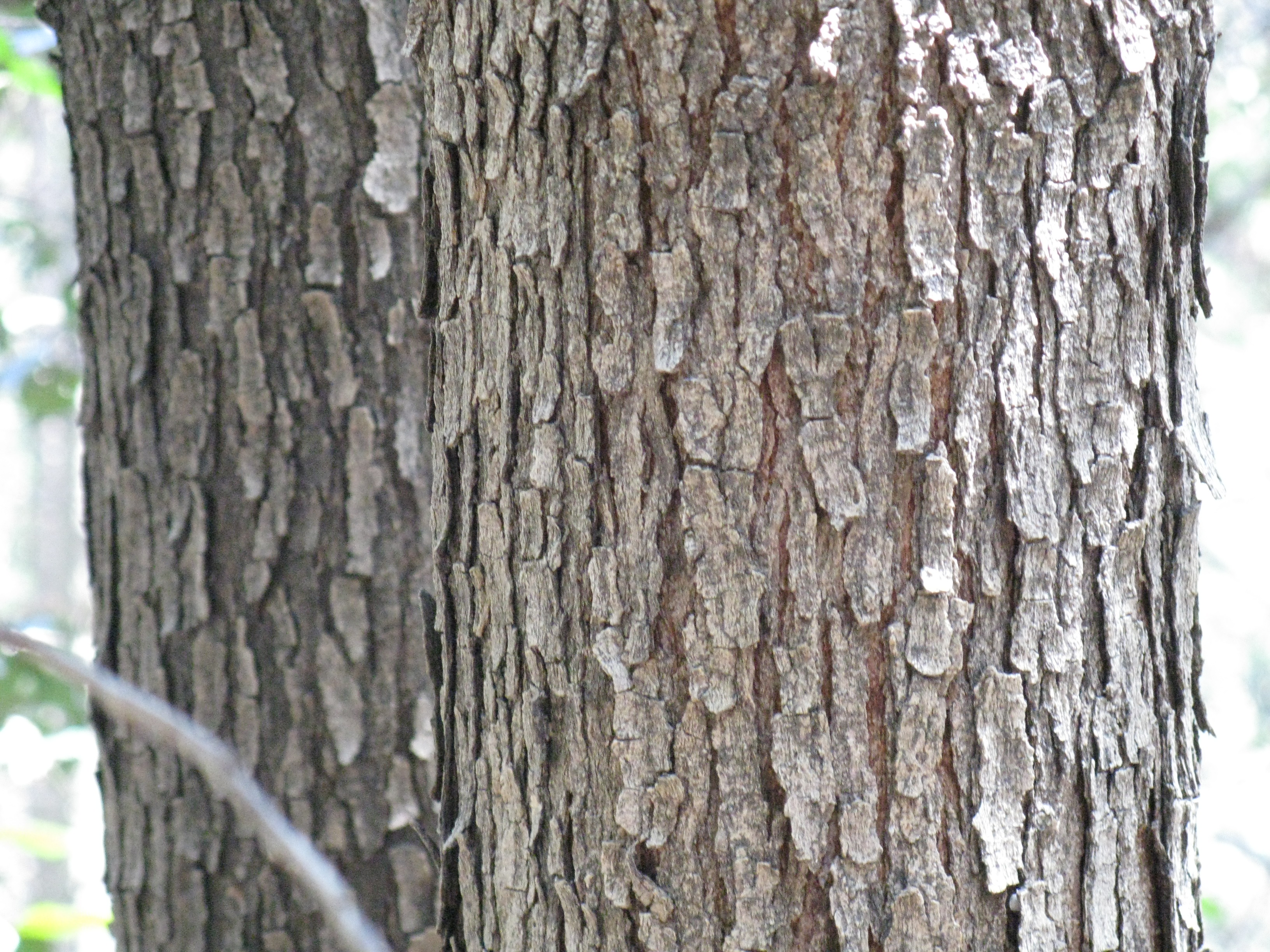
Bark

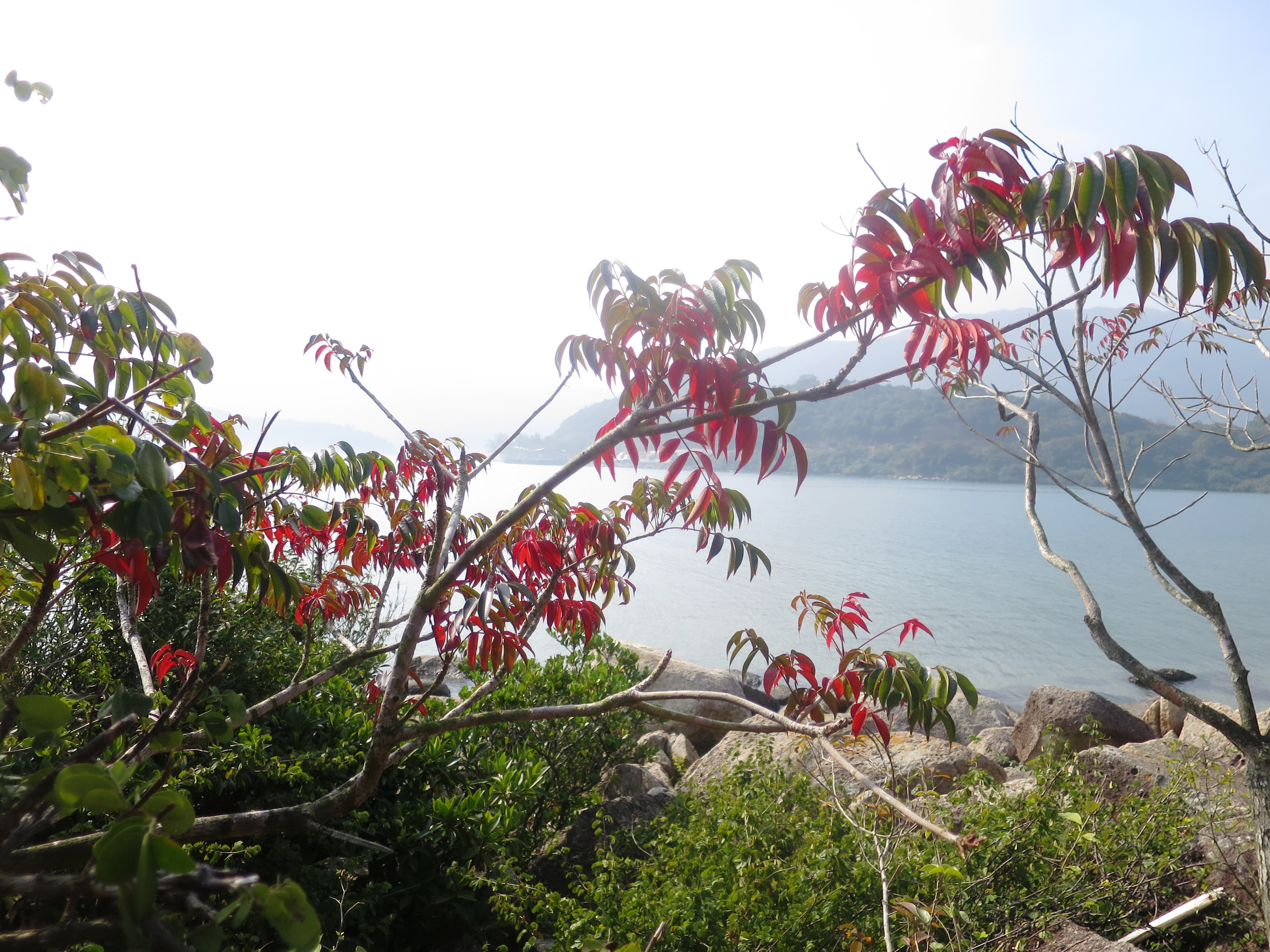
A very common wild tree in Hong Kong

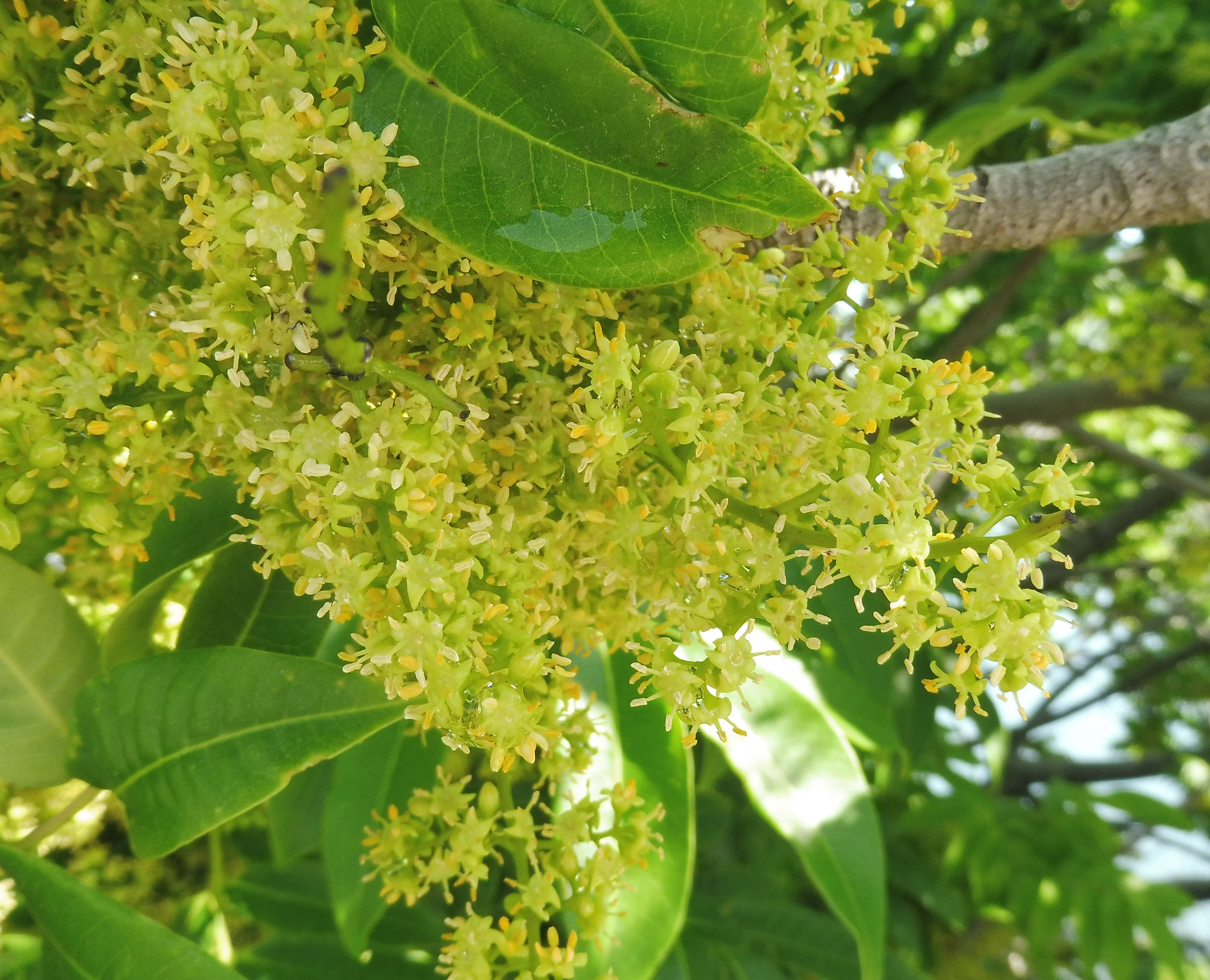
Detail of flowers

== See also ==
- Urushiol
