= Eteoryctis picrasmae =

Scientific classification
- Kingdom: Animalia
- Phylum: Arthropoda
- Clade: Pancrustacea
- Class: Insecta
- Order: Lepidoptera
- Family: Gracillariidae
- Genus: Eteoryctis
- Species: E. picrasmae

Binomial name
- Eteoryctis picrasmae Kumata & Kuroko, 1988

Species of moth

Eteoryctis picrasmae is a moth of the family Gracillariidae. It is known from the islands of Hokkaidō and Honshū in Japan.

The wingspan is 7.6–10 mm.

The larvae feed on Picrasma quassioides. They mine the leaves of their host plant.
