= Dry lacquer =

Traditional technique for making lacquer sculpture

Portrait of Ganjin at Tōshōdai-ji, Nara, a hollow dry-lacquer sculpture designated a National Treasure.

Dry Lacquer, known in Chinese as ganqi jiazhu (干漆夹苎), is a traditional technique used in Buddhist sculpture. Cloth and lacquer are built up over a core, which is either retained or removed to leave a hollow figure. Hollow sculptures are comparatively light and portable.

== Technique ==
The Chinese craft distinguishes hollow-core and wood-core construction. In hollow-core work, a clay model is covered with strips of cloth and lacquer. The clay is removed after the shell has hardened. In wood-core work, the wooden body remains beneath the cloth and lacquer layers.

In the Tiantai tradition, the cloth is made from ramie. The fibre varies between works: a technical study of four early Chinese dry-lacquer sculptures identified hemp cloth in all four.

== History ==
=== Early Chinese sculpture ===
Later Buddhist texts describe five portable images made by Dai Kui during the Eastern Jin dynasty. These images, formerly kept at Waguan Temple, no longer survive. Art historian Denise Patry Leidy discusses the accounts as early records of lacquer Buddhist sculpture and suggests that the description of the images as portable indicates hollow-core construction.

A Buddha in the Walters Art Museum, dated to about 590, is described by the museum as the oldest known surviving Chinese sculpture of its type. It was carved from twelve joined pieces of wood and covered with lacquer and paint. The Metropolitan Museum of Art holds an early seventh-century dry-lacquer Buddha, probably representing Amitābha, with coloured pigment and gilding. An eighth-century hollow dry-lacquer bodhisattva is held by the Cleveland Museum of Art.

=== Japan ===
A seated portrait of the Chinese monk Jianzhen, known in Japan as Ganjin, is preserved at Tōshōdai-ji in Nara. The hollow dry-lacquer sculpture is designated a National Treasure. Chinese heritage accounts attribute the portrait to his disciple Situo. The temple's own account states that the disciple Ninki is believed to have supervised its production.

== Tiantai tradition ==
In 2006, the dry lacquer technique of Tiantai Mountain, Zhejiang, was included in China's first national list of intangible cultural heritage. It is registered under project number VIII-53, serial number 403, with Tiantai County as the nominating locality.

Tang Chunfu is identified as a national representative bearer of the craft. A 2017 account on the China Intangible Cultural Heritage Network reports that his Thousand-armed Guanyin received a gold award at the 1999 Century Cup arts and crafts exhibition and was acquired by the Palace Museum in Beijing.

== Gallery ==
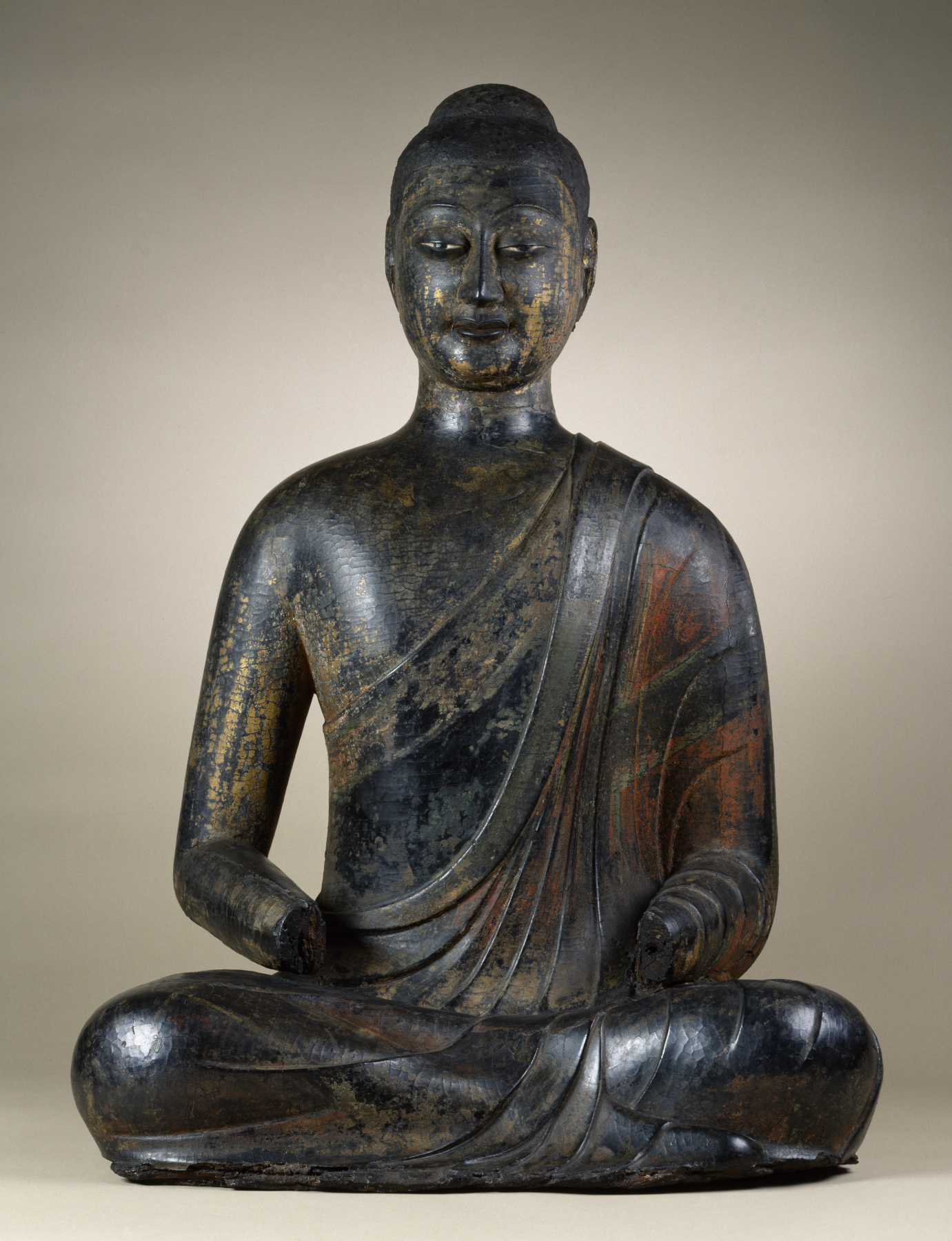
Buddha, about 590, Walters Art Museum.

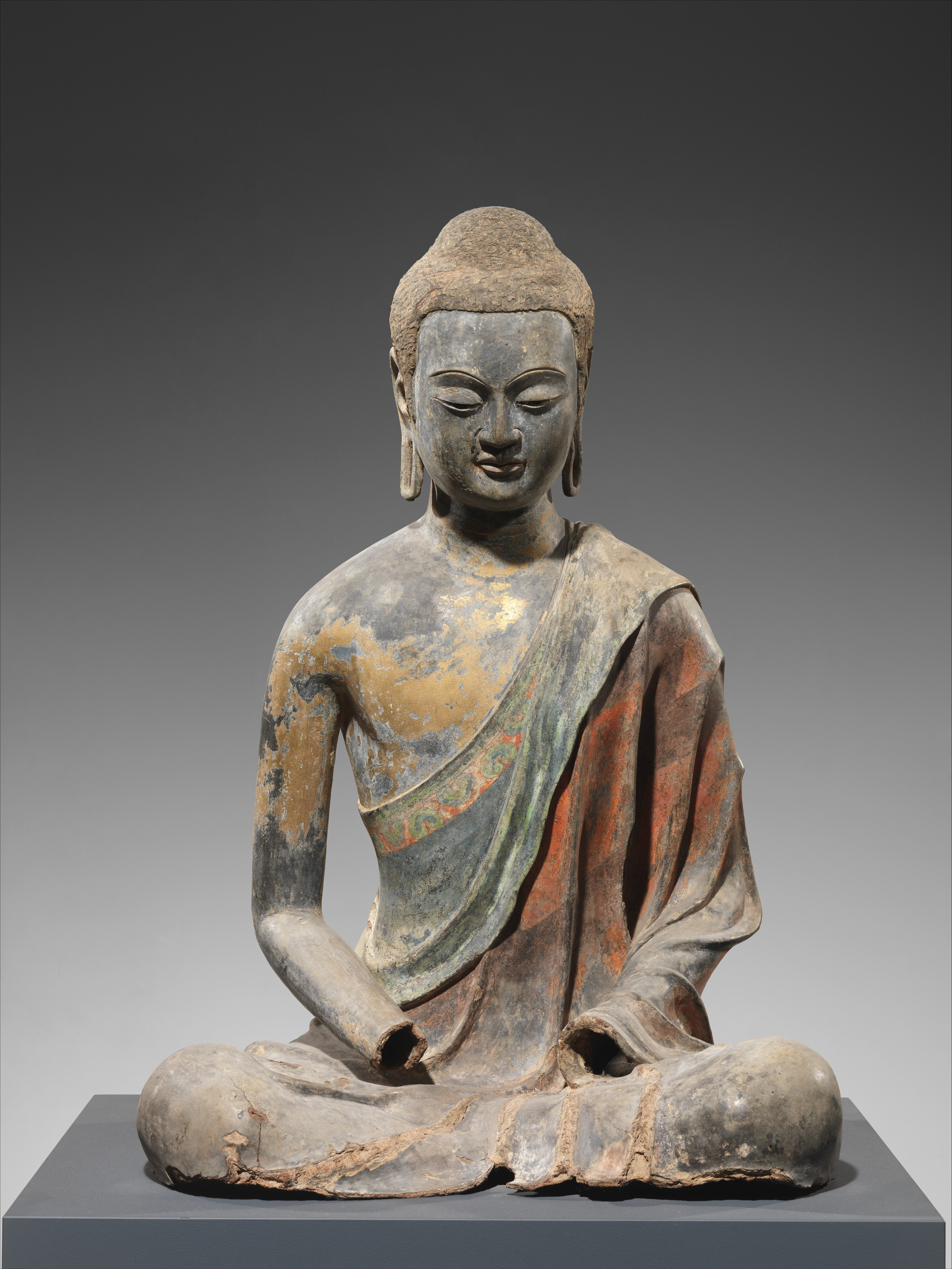
Buddha, probably Amitābha, early seventh century, Metropolitan Museum of Art.

Bodhisattva, eighth century, Cleveland Museum of Art.

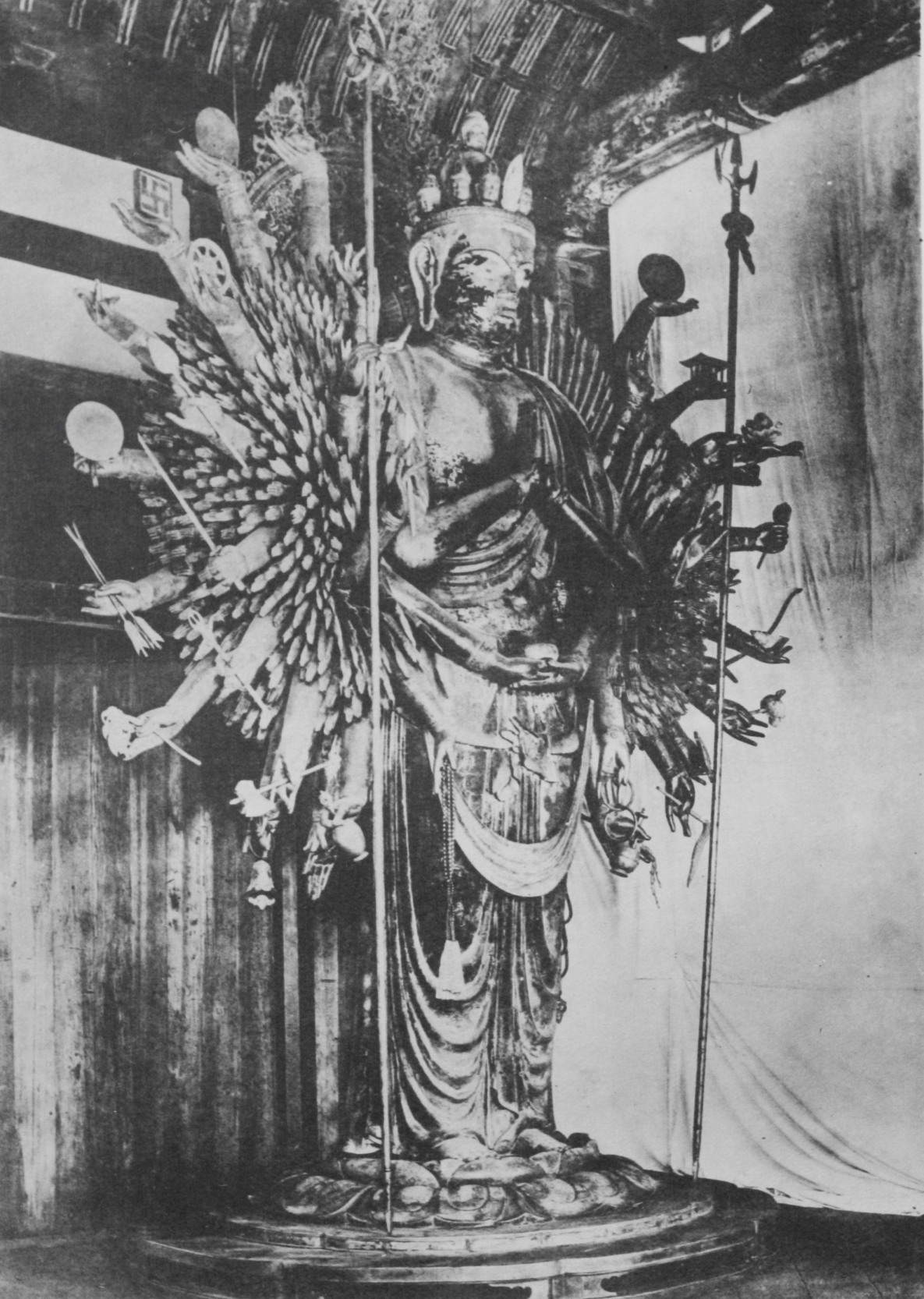
Wood-core dry-lacquer Thousand-armed Kannon at Tōshōdai-ji.

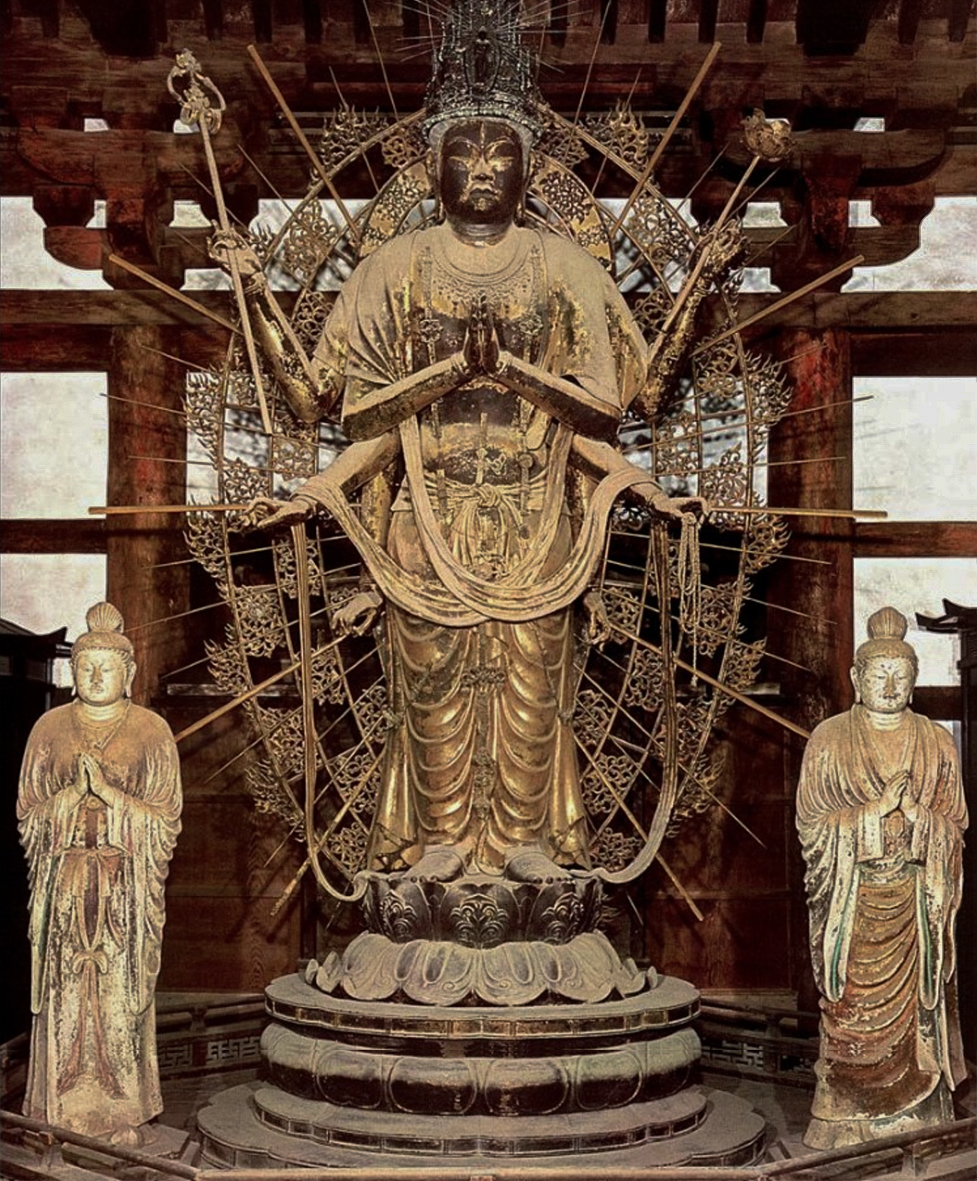
Fukūkensaku Kannon at Tōdai-ji, Nara.

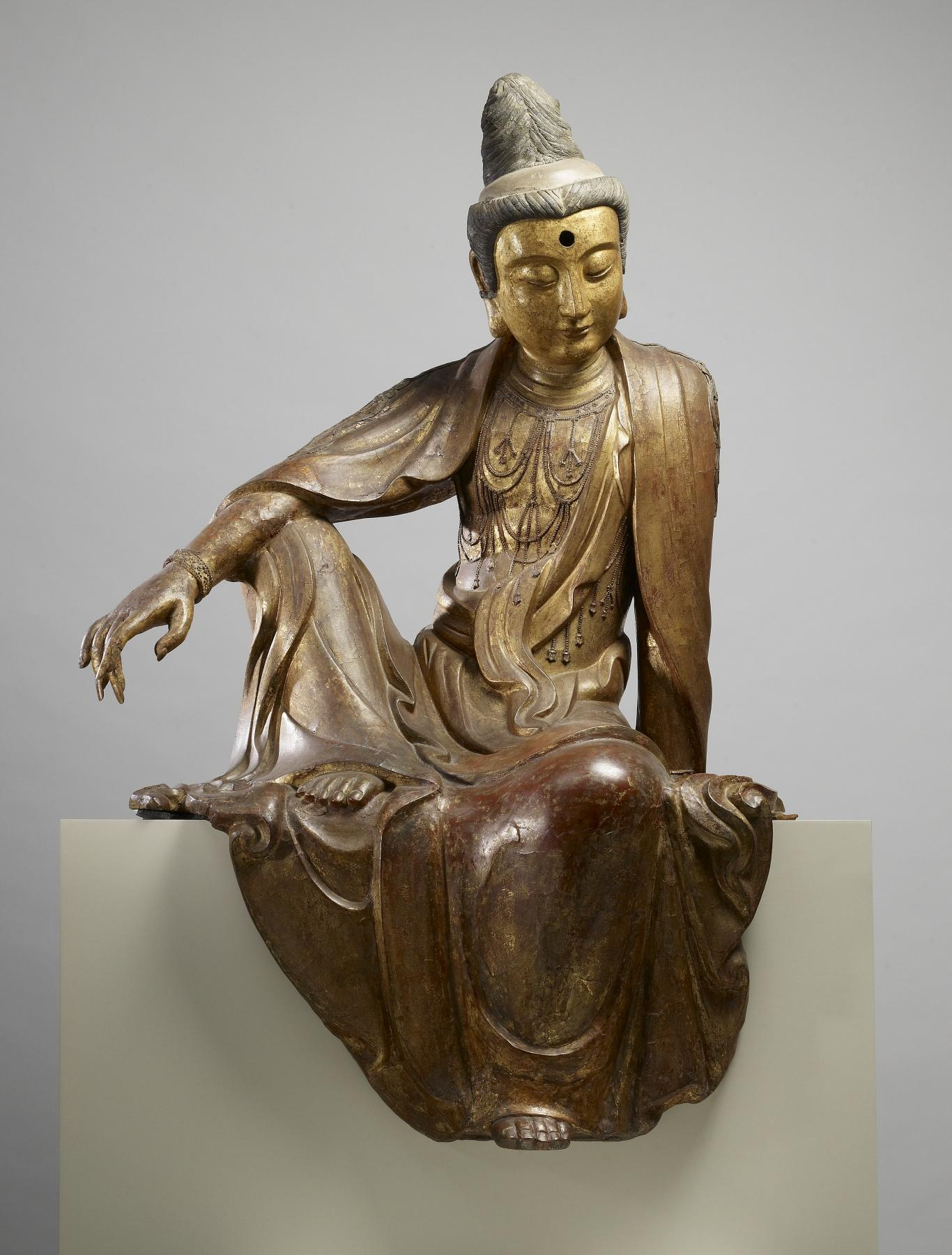
Seated Guanyin, late fourteenth to fifteenth century, Walters Art Museum.

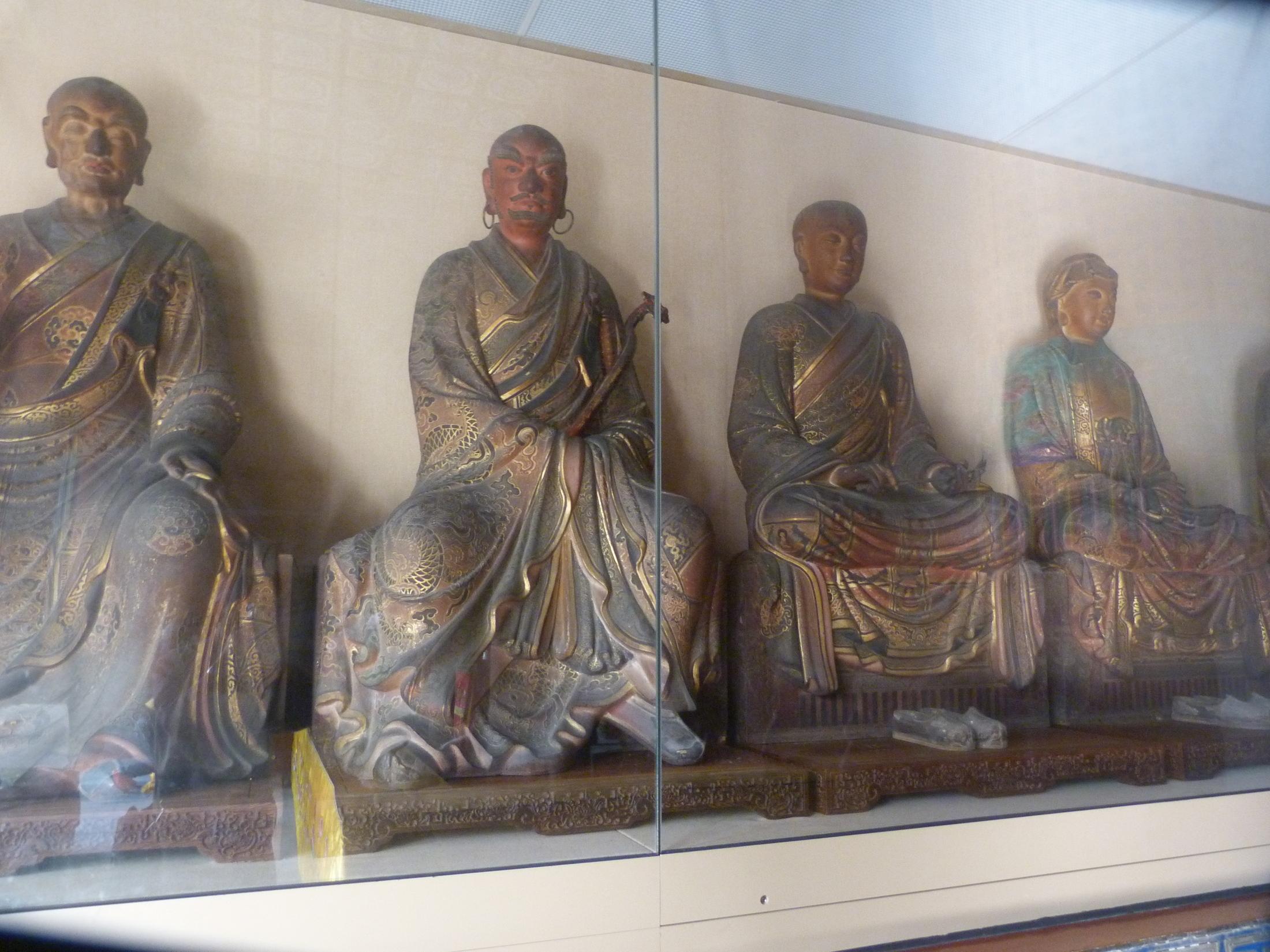
Arhat figures at White Horse Temple, Luoyang.

== See also ==
- Lacquerware
