= Eteoryctis =

Scientific classification
- Kingdom: Animalia
- Phylum: Arthropoda
- Class: Insecta
- Order: Lepidoptera
- Family: Gracillariidae
- Subfamily: Acrocercopinae
- Genus: Eteoryctis; Kumata & Kuroko, 1988

Species
- See text

Genus of moths

Eteoryctis is a genus of moths in the family Gracillariidae.

== Etymology ==
Eteoryctis is derived from the Greek eteos (meaning true) and oryctis (meaning digger, miner).

== Species ==
- Eteoryctis deversa (Meyrick, 1922)
- Eteoryctis gemoniella (Stainton, 1862)
- Eteoryctis picrasmae Kumata & Kuroko, 1988
- Eteoryctis syngramma (Meyrick, 1914)
