= Cupping tester =

Cupping testers are employed in the testing of the elongation and deformability of lacquers and protective coatings applied to metal substrates. This sort of test is essential because it allows one to test the durability of a lacquer or protective coating before the coating is applied to a product.

== Operation ==
The cupping tester operates by using a punch to push upon the unpainted side of a coated panel until the painted side shows signs of deformation (cracks) in the coating. It is when cracks start to appear that the lacquer or coating's durability can be recorded, this durability is known as the coating's flexibility rating.

The test can also be performed according to a predetermined depth. For example, if a coating needed a certain flexibility rating, then the tester would be set to a depth in accordance with that rating, without the need to deform the coating until it fails.

== Appearance ==
There are a variety of cupping testers, ranging from the manual to the fully automated, and from single substrate to multiple substrate testers. However, generally they consist of a solid metal base which forms a circle over which the coating is tested. There is a punch that will go up to and through this metal hole in order to apply pressure to the coating and substrate. In addition to these core components, there is usually an included magnifier which helps to determine the point of major deformation. These components can be arranged in a variety of ways, but these components remain consistent in all designs.
