= Caloptilia rhois =

Scientific classification
- Kingdom: Animalia
- Phylum: Arthropoda
- Class: Insecta
- Order: Lepidoptera
- Family: Gracillariidae
- Genus: Caloptilia
- Species: C. rhois

Binomial name
- Caloptilia rhois Kumata, 1982

Species of moth

Caloptilia rhois is a moth of the family Gracillariidae. It is known from China (Zhejiang, Hubei, Hunan, Jiangxi, Shannxi, Sichuan, Anhui, Fujian, Gansu, Guizhou, Henan), Hong Kong, Japan (Honshū, Kyūshū, Hokkaidō) and Korea.

The wingspan is 11.8-13.2 mm. There are two forms, an aestival and an autumnal form.

The larvae feed on Rhus javanica and Toxicodendron succedaneum. They mine the leaves of their host plant.
