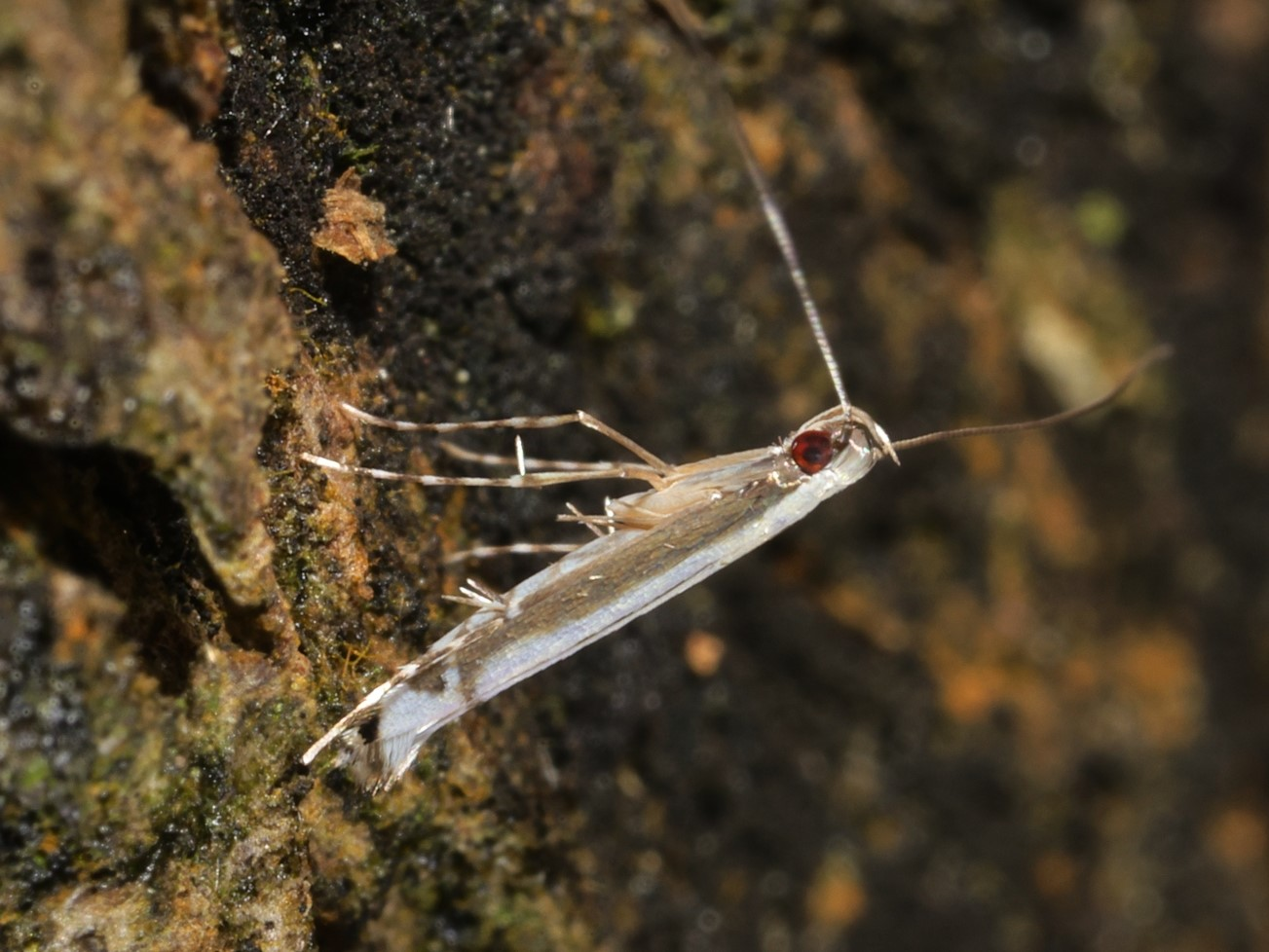

Scientific classification
- Kingdom: Animalia
- Phylum: Arthropoda
- Clade: Pancrustacea
- Class: Insecta
- Order: Lepidoptera
- Family: Gracillariidae
- Genus: Eteoryctis
- Species: E. syngramma

Binomial name
- Eteoryctis syngramma (Meyrick, 1914)

Synonyms
- Acrocercops syngramma Meyrick, 1914

= Eteoryctis syngramma =

Species of moth

Eteoryctis syngramma is a species of moth in the family Gracillariidae. It is known from China (Hong Kong), India (Andaman Islands, Karnataka and the Nicobar Islands), Indonesia and Thailand.

The larvae feed on Anacardium occidentale and Mangifera indica.
