= Eteoryctis gemoniella =

Scientific classification
- Kingdom: Animalia
- Phylum: Arthropoda
- Clade: Pancrustacea
- Class: Insecta
- Order: Lepidoptera
- Family: Gracillariidae
- Genus: Eteoryctis
- Species: E. gemoniella

Binomial name
- Eteoryctis gemoniella (Stainton, 1862)

Species of moth

Eteoryctis gemoniella is a moth of the family Gracillariidae. It is known from West Bengal, India.

The larvae feed on Anacardium occidentale, Lannea coromandelica, Semecarpus anacardium, Achras sapota, Madhuca indica, Madhuca latifolia and Manilkara zapota. They probably mine the leaves of their host plant.
