= Lacquer =

Type of hard and shiny finish

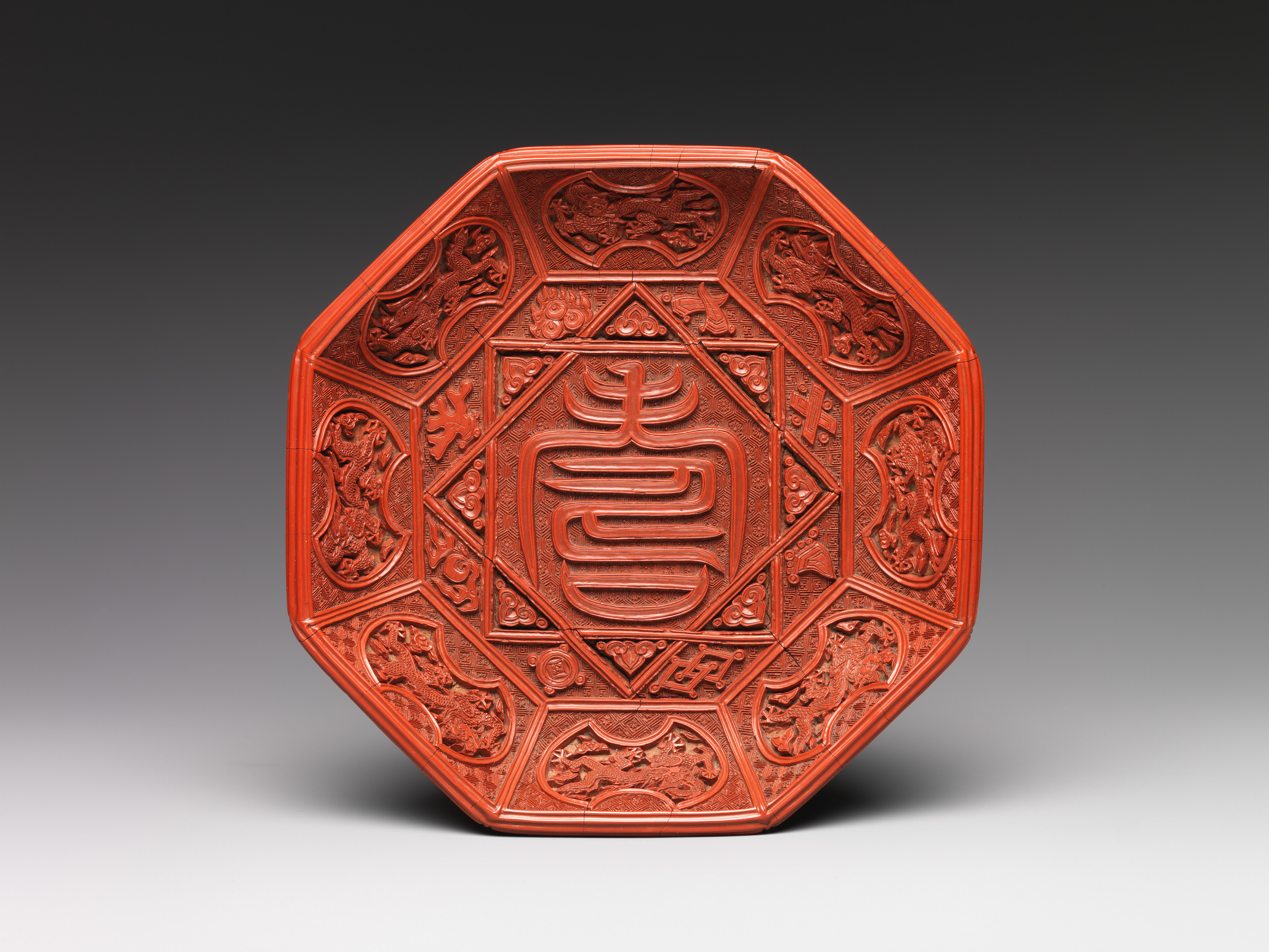
Lacquer dish with Chinese character for longevity, mid 16th century

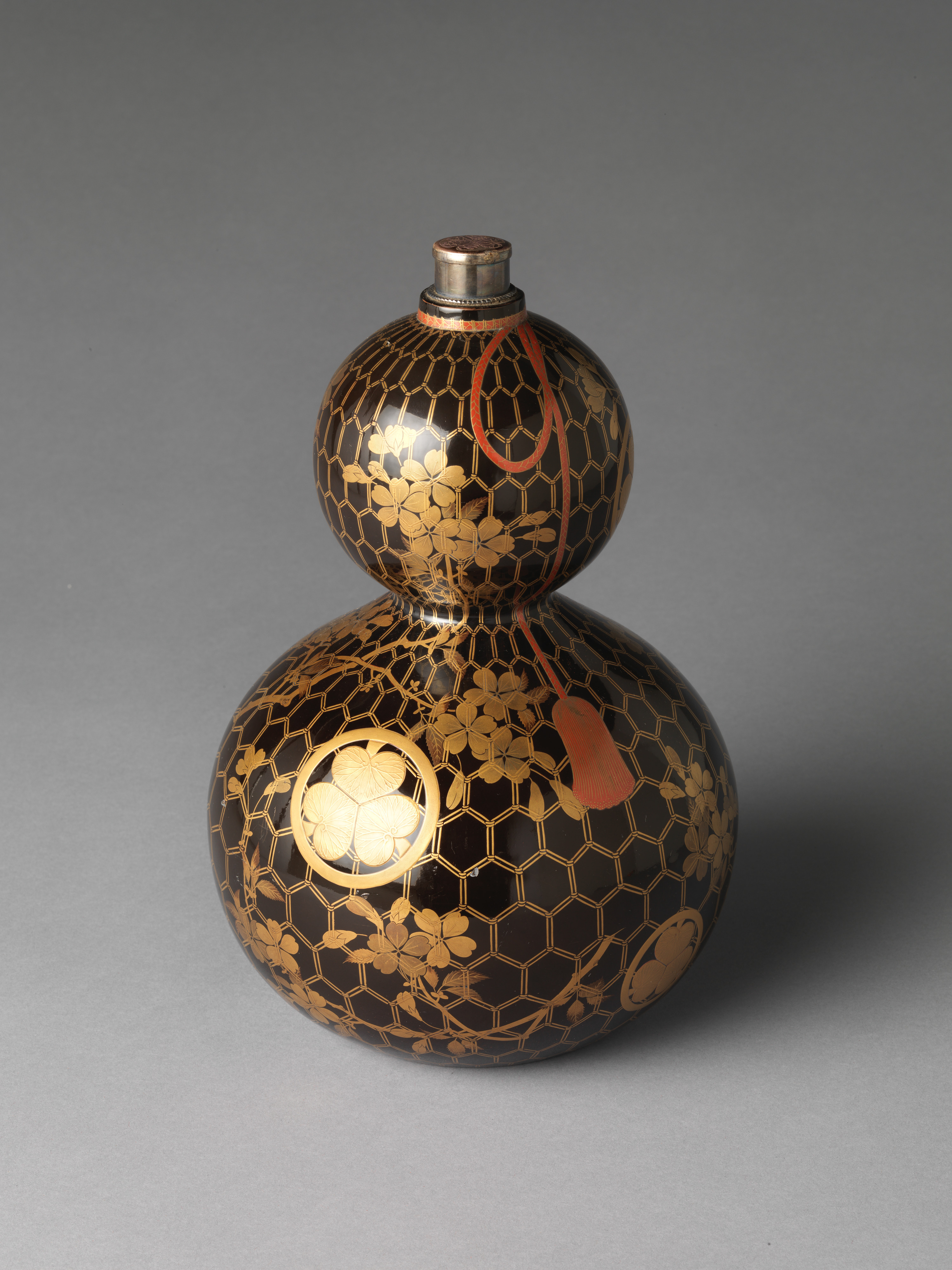
Maki-e sake bottle with Tokugawa clan's mon (emblem), Japan, Edo period

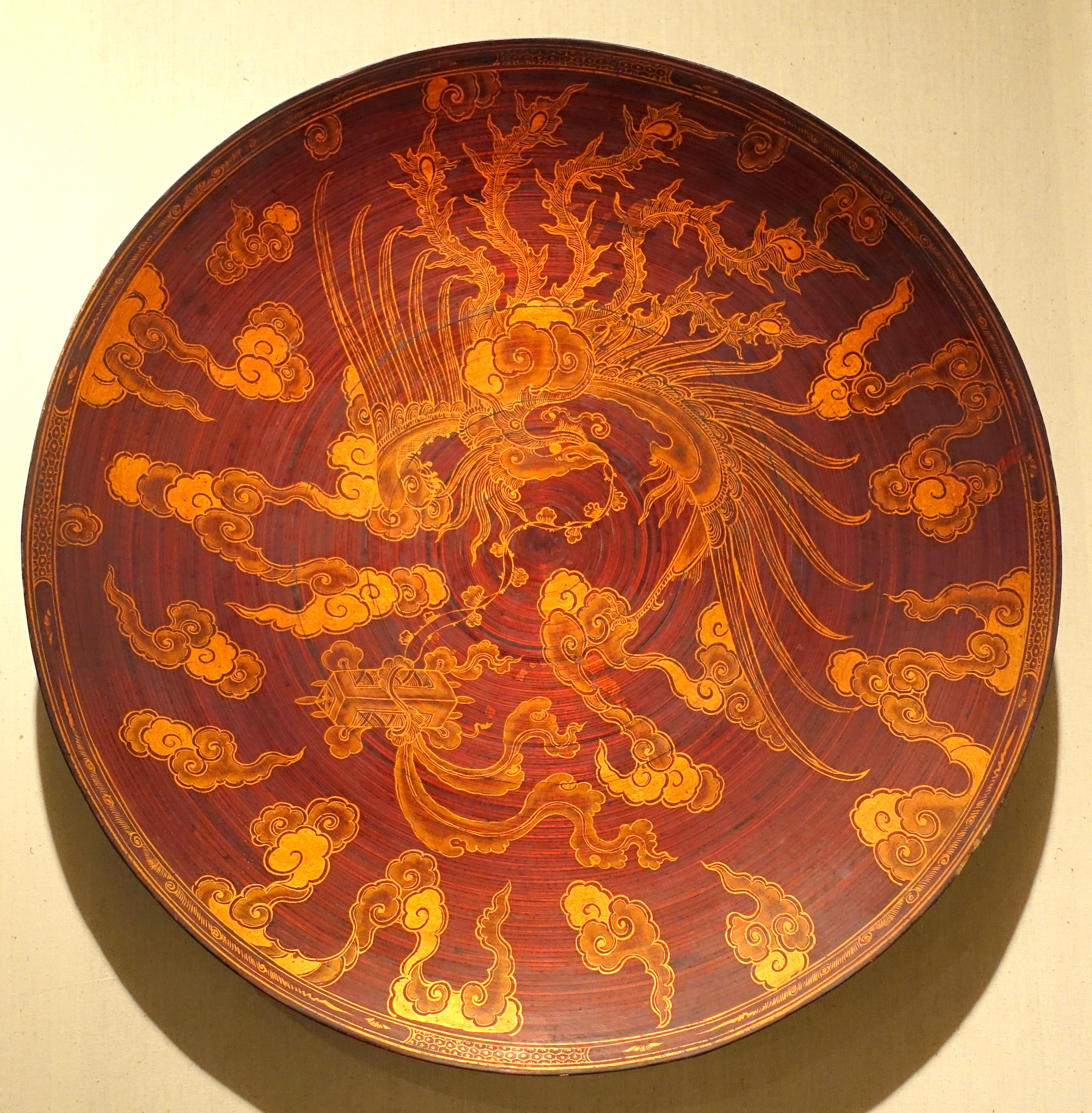
Lacquer plate, Nam Định province, Vietnam, Nguyễn dynasty

Lacquer is a type of hard and usually shiny coating or finish applied to materials such as wood or metal. It is most often made from tree sap and wax and has been in use since antiquity.

Asian lacquerware, which may be called "true lacquer", are objects coated with the treated, dyed and dried sap of Toxicodendron vernicifluum or related trees, applied in several coats to a base that is usually wood. This dries to a very hard and smooth surface layer which is durable, waterproof, and attractive in feel and look. Asian lacquer is sometimes painted with pictures, inlaid with shell and other materials, or carved, as well as dusted with gold and given other further decorative treatments.

In modern techniques, lacquer means a range of clear or pigmented coatings that dry by solvent evaporation to produce a hard, durable finish. The finish can be of any sheen level from ultra matte to high gloss, and it can be further polished as required. Lacquer finishes are usually harder and more brittle than oil-based or latex paints and are typically used on hard and smooth surfaces.

In terms of modern finishing products, finishes based on shellac dissolved in alcohol are often called shellac or lac to distinguish them from synthetic lacquer, often called simply lacquer, which consists of synthetic polymers (such as nitrocellulose, cellulose acetate butyrate ("CAB"), or acrylic resin) dissolved in lacquer thinner, a mixture of various organic solvents. Although synthetic lacquer is more durable than shellac, traditional shellac finishes are nevertheless often preferred for their aesthetic characteristics, as with French polish, as well as their "all-natural" and generally food-safe ingredients.

== Etymology ==
The English lacquer is from the archaic French word lacre, "a kind of sealing wax", from Portuguese lacre, itself an unexplained variant of Medieval Latin lacca "resinous substance," from Arabic lakk (لك), from Persian lāk (لاک), from Hindi lākh (लाख); Prakrit lakkha, 𑀮𑀓𑁆𑀔), itself from the Sanskrit word lākshā (लाक्षा) for lac bug, representing the number one hundred thousand (100,000), used as wood finish in ancient India and neighbouring areas.

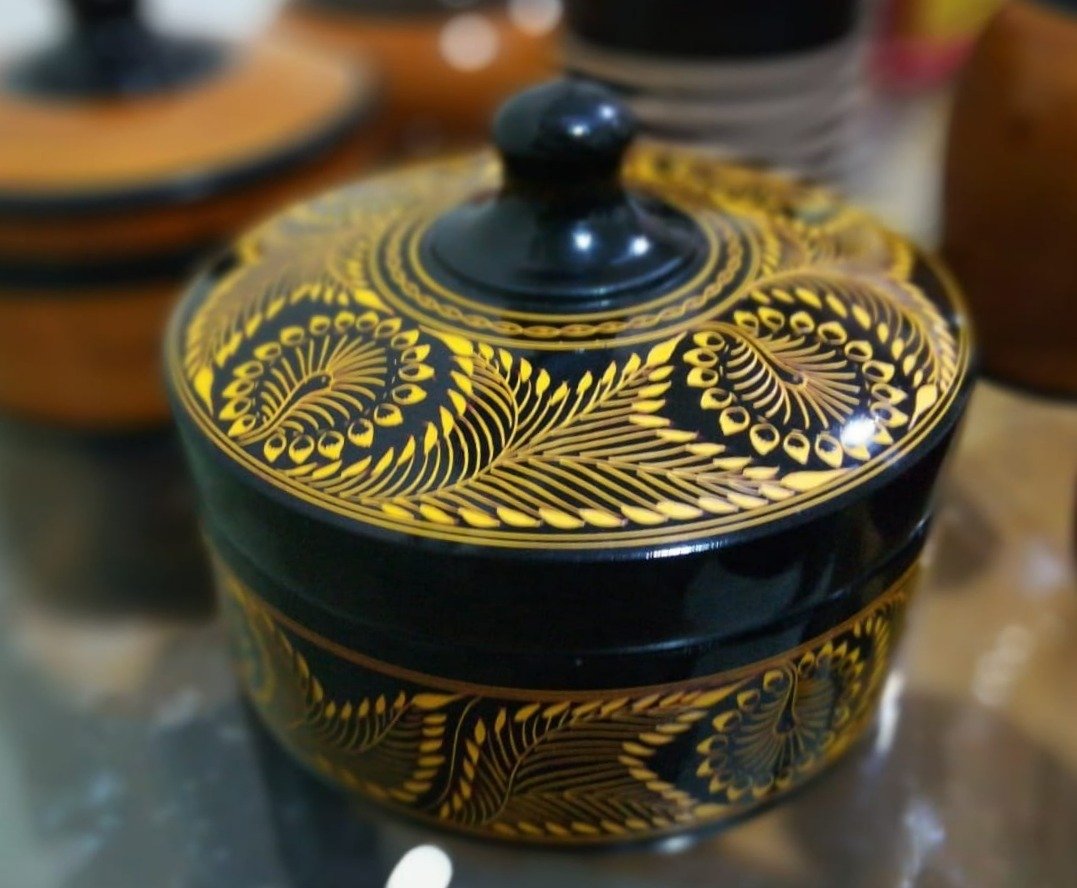
Laksha is a traditional form of lacquerware from Sri Lanka which is made from shellac derived from Lac.

== Sheen measurement ==
Lacquer sheen is a measurement of the shine for a given lacquer. Different manufacturers have their own names and standards for their sheen. The most common names from least shiny to most shiny are: flat, matte, eggshell, satin, semi-gloss, and gloss (high).

== Shellac-based lacquers ==
In India shellac derived from insect lac was used since ancient times. Shellac is the secretion of the lac bug (Tachardia lacca Kerr. or Laccifer lacca). It is used for wood finish, lacquerware, skin cosmetic, ornaments, dye for textiles, production of different grades of shellac for surface coating.

== Urushiol-based lacquers ==
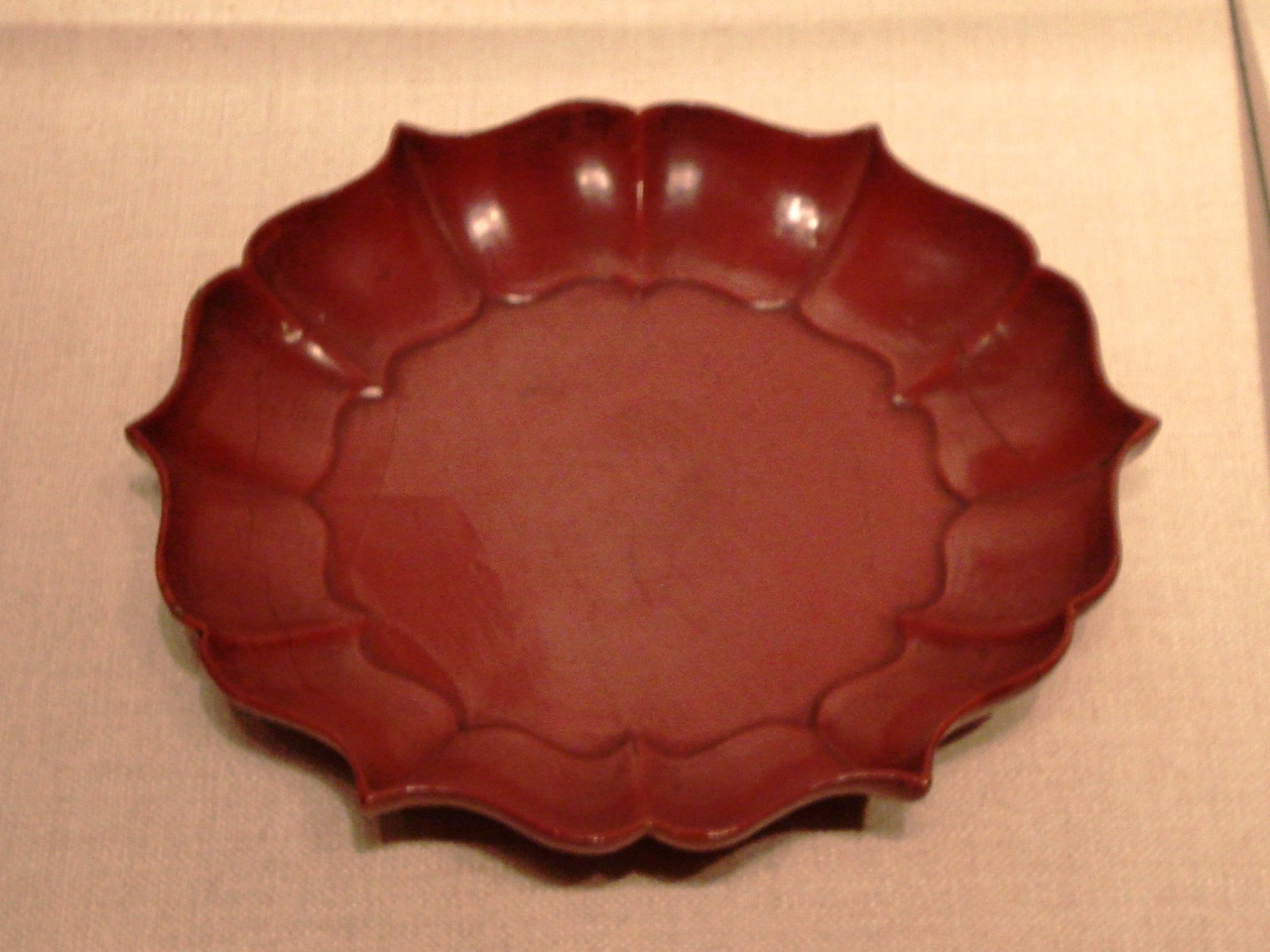
A Chinese six-pointed tray, red lacquer over wood, from the Song dynasty (960–1279), 12th–13th century, Metropolitan Museum of Art.

Urushiol-based lacquers differ from most others, being slow-drying, and set by oxidation and polymerization, rather than by evaporation alone. The active ingredient of the resin is urushiol, a mixture of various phenols suspended in water, plus a few proteins. In order for it to set properly it requires a humid and warm environment. The phenols oxidize and polymerize under the action of laccase enzymes, yielding a substrate that, upon proper evaporation of its water content, is hard. These lacquers produce very hard, durable finishes that are both beautiful and very resistant to damage by water, acid, alkali or abrasion. The resin is derived from trees indigenous to East Asia, like lacquer tree Toxicodendron vernicifluum, and wax tree Toxicodendron succedaneum. The fresh resin from the T. vernicifluum trees causes urushiol-induced contact dermatitis and great care is therefore required in its use. The Chinese treated the allergic reaction with crushed shellfish, which supposedly prevents lacquer from drying properly. Lacquer skills became very highly developed in Asia, and many highly decorated pieces were produced.

It has been confirmed that the lacquer tree has existed in Japan since nearly 12,600 years ago in the incipient Jōmon period. This was confirmed by radioactive carbon dating of the lacquer tree found at the Torihama shell mound and is the oldest lacquer tree in the world found as of 2011. Lacquer was used in Japan as early as 7000 BCE, during the Jōmon period. Evidence for the earliest lacquerware was discovered at the Kakinoshima "B" Excavation Site in Hokkaido. The ornaments woven with lacquered red thread were discovered in a pit grave dating from the first half of the Initial Jōmon period. Also, at Kakinoshima "A" Excavation Site, earthenware with a spout painted with vermilion lacquer, which was made 3200 years ago, was found almost completely intact.

During the Shang dynasty (1600–1046 BC), the sophisticated techniques used in the lacquer process were first developed and it became a highly artistic craft, although various prehistoric lacquerwares have been unearthed in China dating back to the Neolithic period. The earliest extant Chinese lacquer object, a red wooden bowl, was unearthed at a Hemudu culture (5000–4500 BC) site in China. By the Han dynasty (206 BC – 220 AD), many centres of lacquer production became firmly established. The knowledge of the Chinese methods of the lacquer process spread from China during the Han, Tang and Song dynasties. Eventually it was introduced to Korea and Japan.

Trade of lacquer objects travelled through various routes to the Middle East. Known applications of lacquer in China included coffins, music instruments, furniture, and various household items. Lacquer mixed with powdered cinnabar is used to produce the traditional red lacquerware from China.

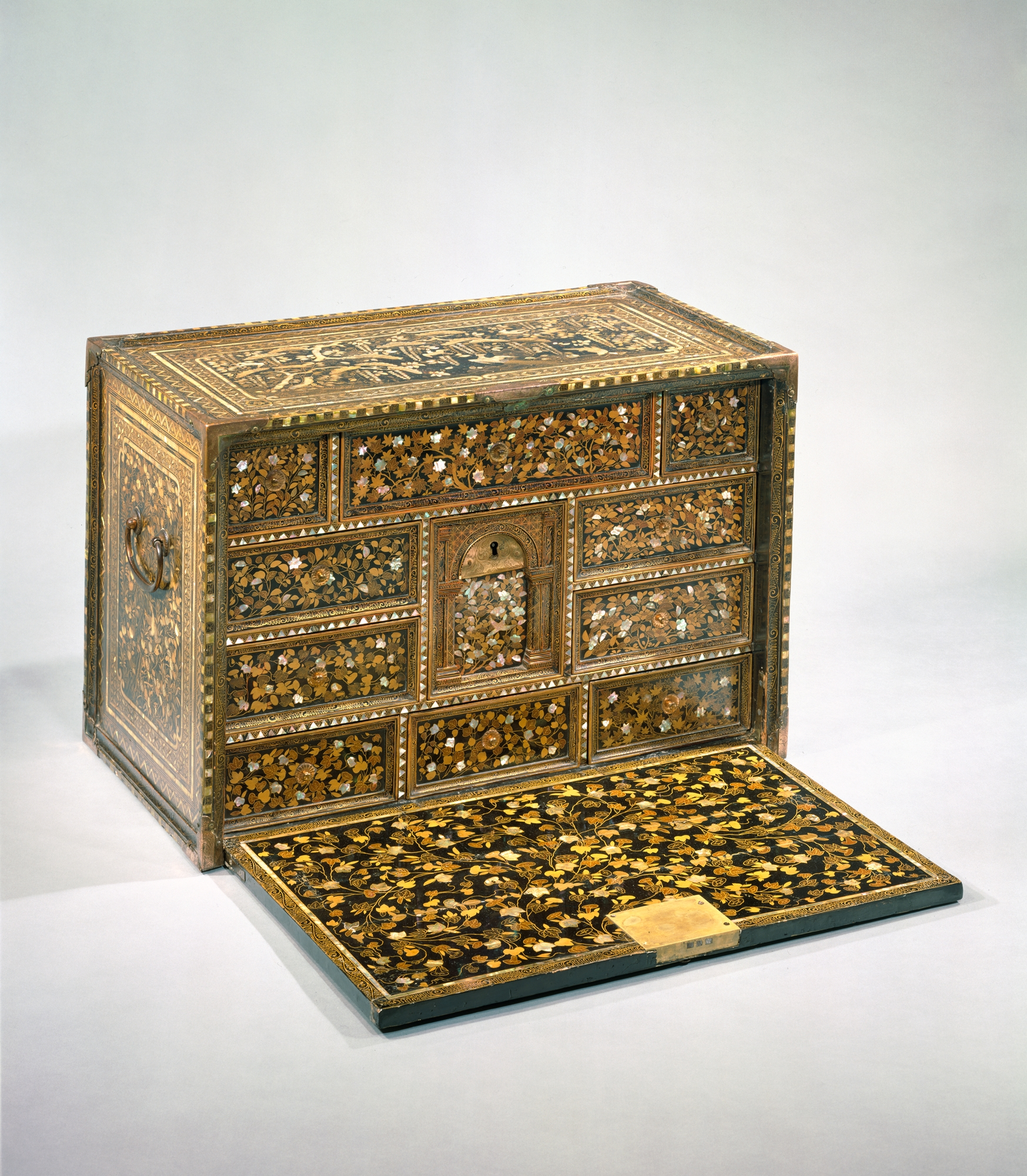
A maki-e and mother-of-pearl inlay cabinet that was exported from Japan to Europe in the 16th century.

From the 16th century to the 17th century, lacquer was introduced to Europe on a large scale for the first time through trade with Japanese. Until the 19th century, lacquerware was one of Japan's major exports, and European royalty, aristocrats and religious people represented by Marie-Antoinette, Maria Theresa and The Society of Jesus collected Japanese lacquerware luxuriously decorated with maki-e. The terms related to lacquer such as "Japanning", "Urushiol" and "maque" which means lacquer in Mexican Spanish, are derived from Japanese.

The trees must be at least ten years old before cutting to bleed the resin. It sets by a process called "aqua-polymerization", absorbing oxygen to set; placing in a humid environment allows it to absorb more oxygen from the evaporation of the water.

Lacquer-yielding trees in Thailand, Vietnam, Burma and Taiwan, called Thitsi, are slightly different; they do not contain urushiol, but similar substances called laccol or thitsiol. The result is similar but softer than the Chinese or Japanese lacquer. Burmese lacquer sets slower, and is painted by craftsmen's hands without using brushes.

Raw lacquer can be "coloured" by the addition of small amounts of iron oxides, giving red or black depending on the oxide. There is some evidence that its use is even older than 8,000 years from archaeological digs in Japan and China. Later, pigments were added to make colours. It is used not only as a finish, because if mixed with ground fired and unfired clays applied to a mould with layers of hemp cloth, it can produce objects without need for another core like wood. The process is called "kanshitsu" in Japan. In the lacquering of the Chinese musical instrument, the guqin, the lacquer is mixed with deer horn powder (or ceramic powder) to give it more strength so it can stand up to the fingering.

There are a number of forms of urushiol. They vary by the length of the R chain, which depends on the species of plant producing the urushiol. Urushiol can also vary in the degree of saturation in the carbon chain. Urushiol can be drawn as follows:

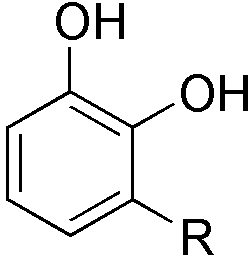

where,

R = (CH_{2})_{14}CH_{3} or
R = (CH_{2})_{7}CH=CH(CH_{2})_{5}CH_{3} or
R = (CH_{2})_{7}CH=CHCH_{2}CH=CH(CH_{2})_{2}CH_{3} or
R = (CH_{2})_{7}CH=CHCH_{2}CH=CHCH=CHCH_{3} or
R = (CH_{2})_{7}CH=CHCH_{2}CH=CHCH_{2}CH=CH_{2}

=== Gallery ===
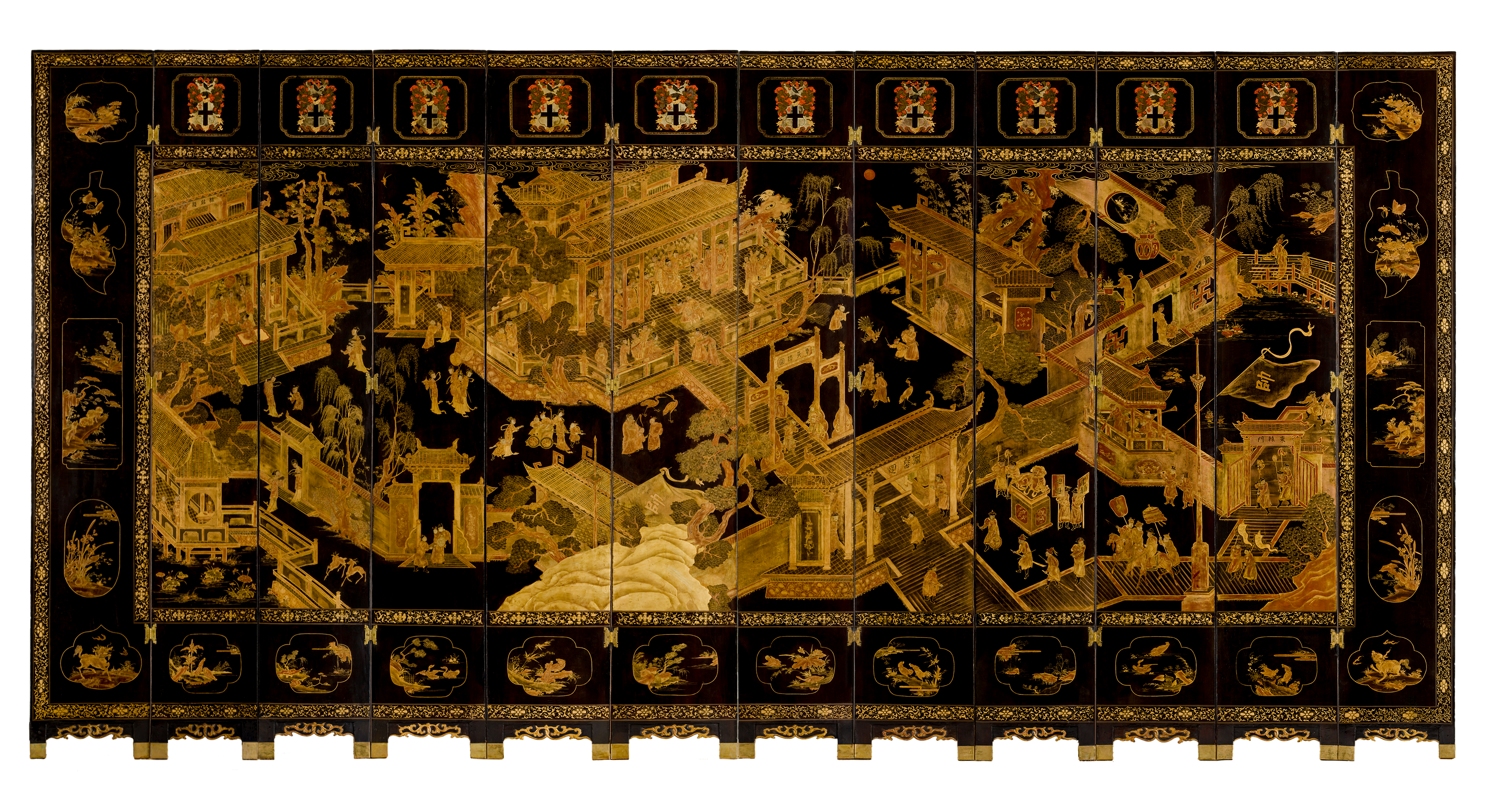
Armorial screen

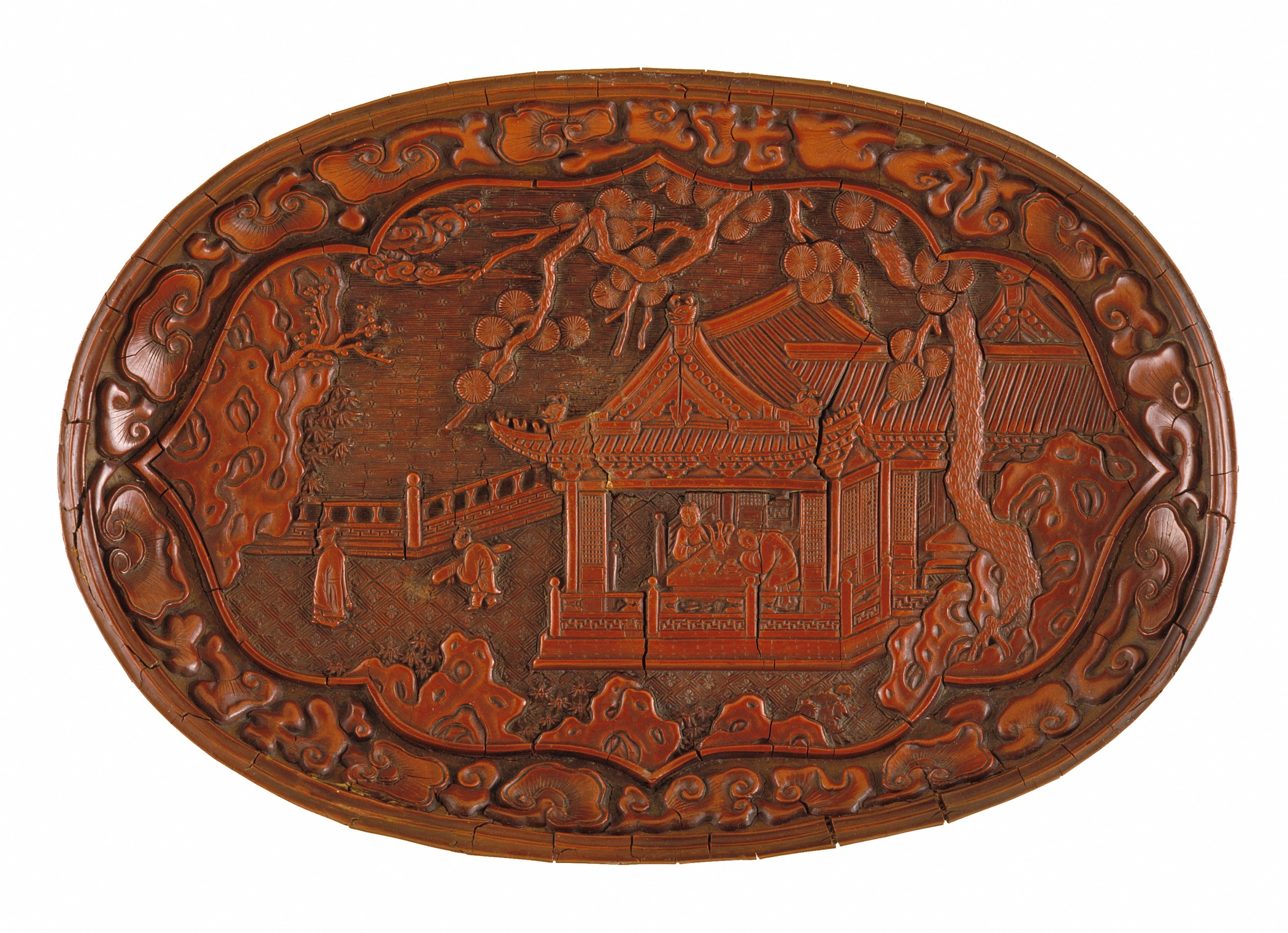
A Chinese carved lacquer oval tray, Yuan dynasty, c. 13th century.

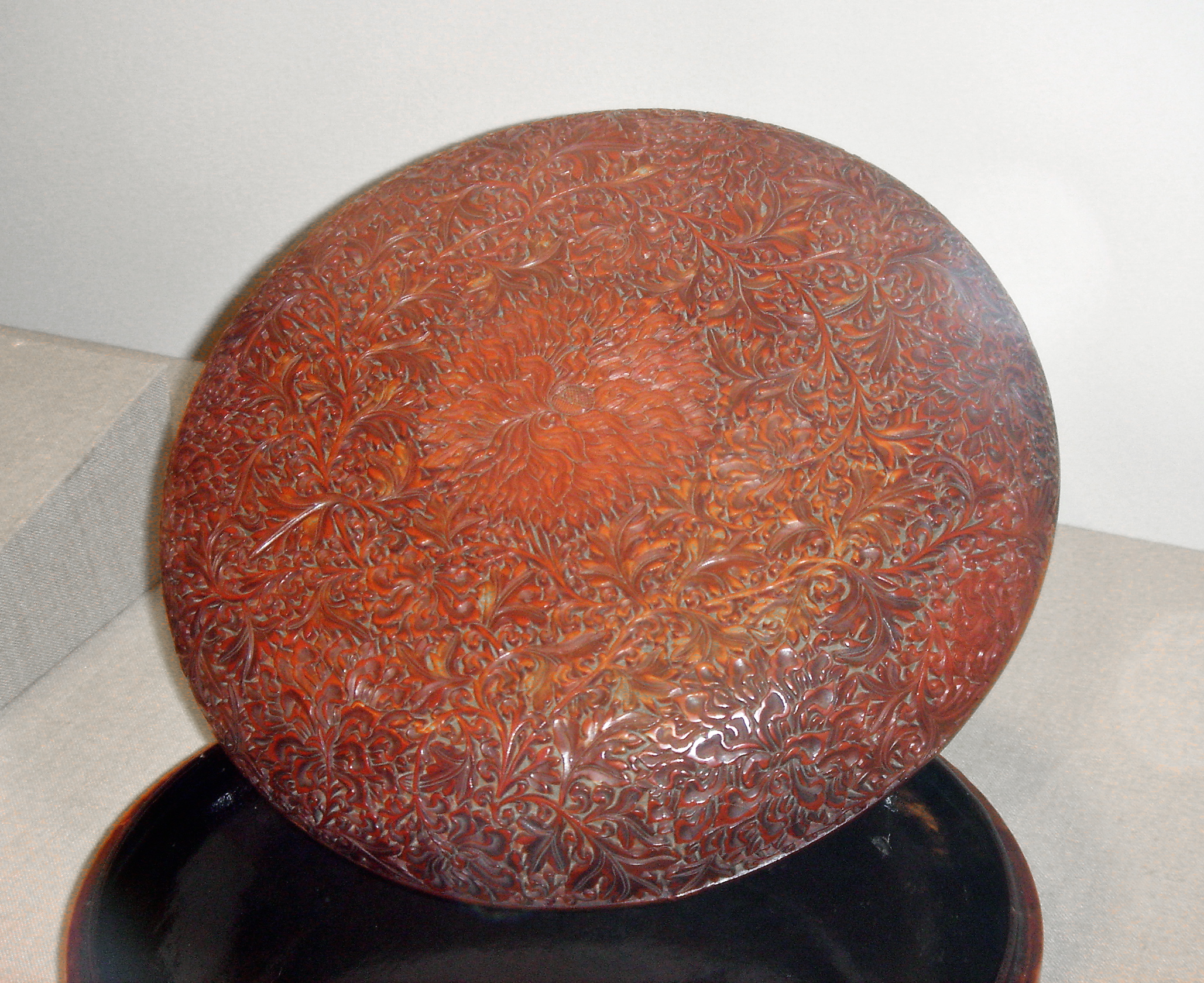
Ming dynasty Chinese lacquerware container, dated 16th century.

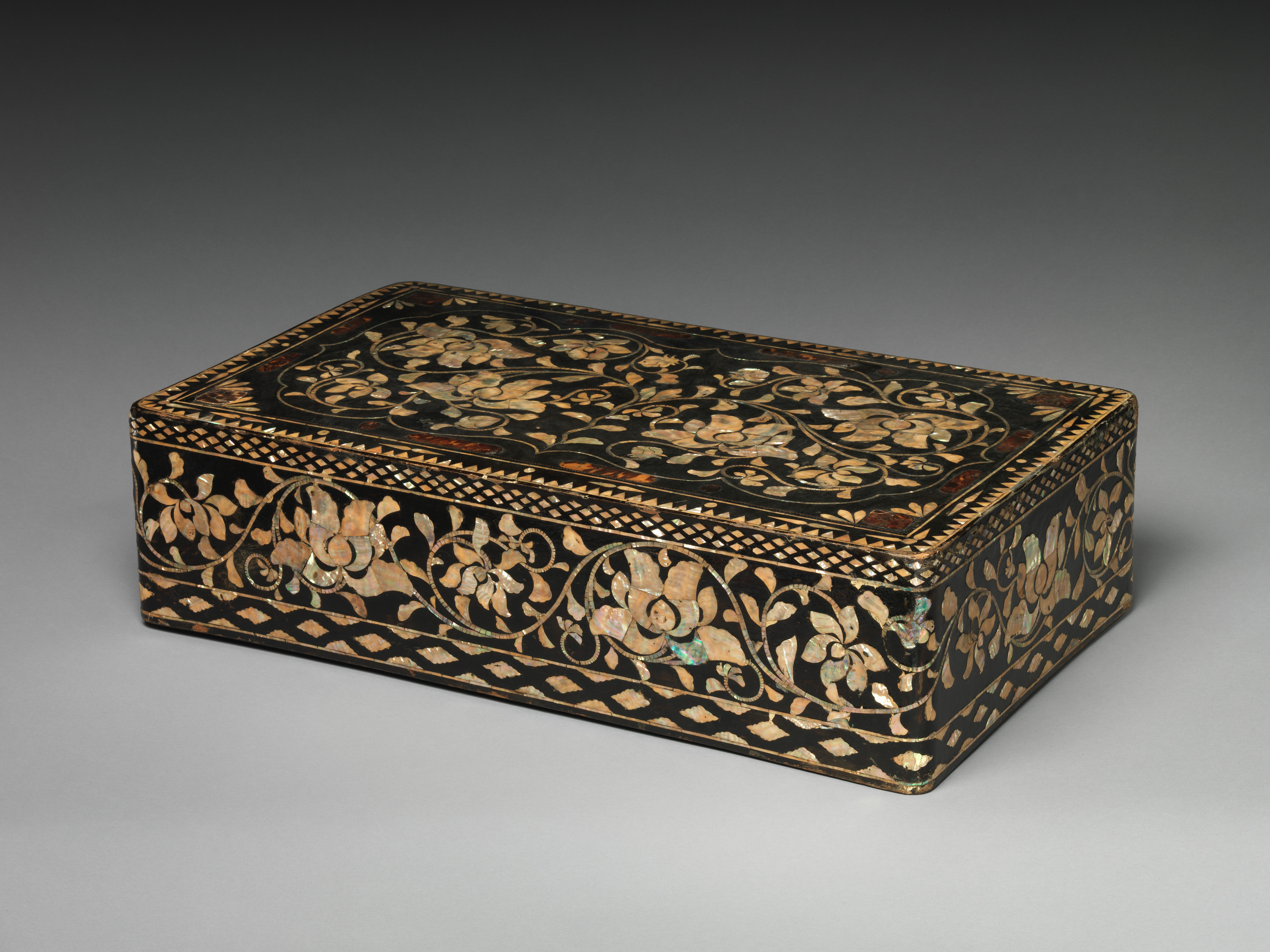
Clothing box decorated with peony scrolls, Joseon dynasty Korea, 17th century.

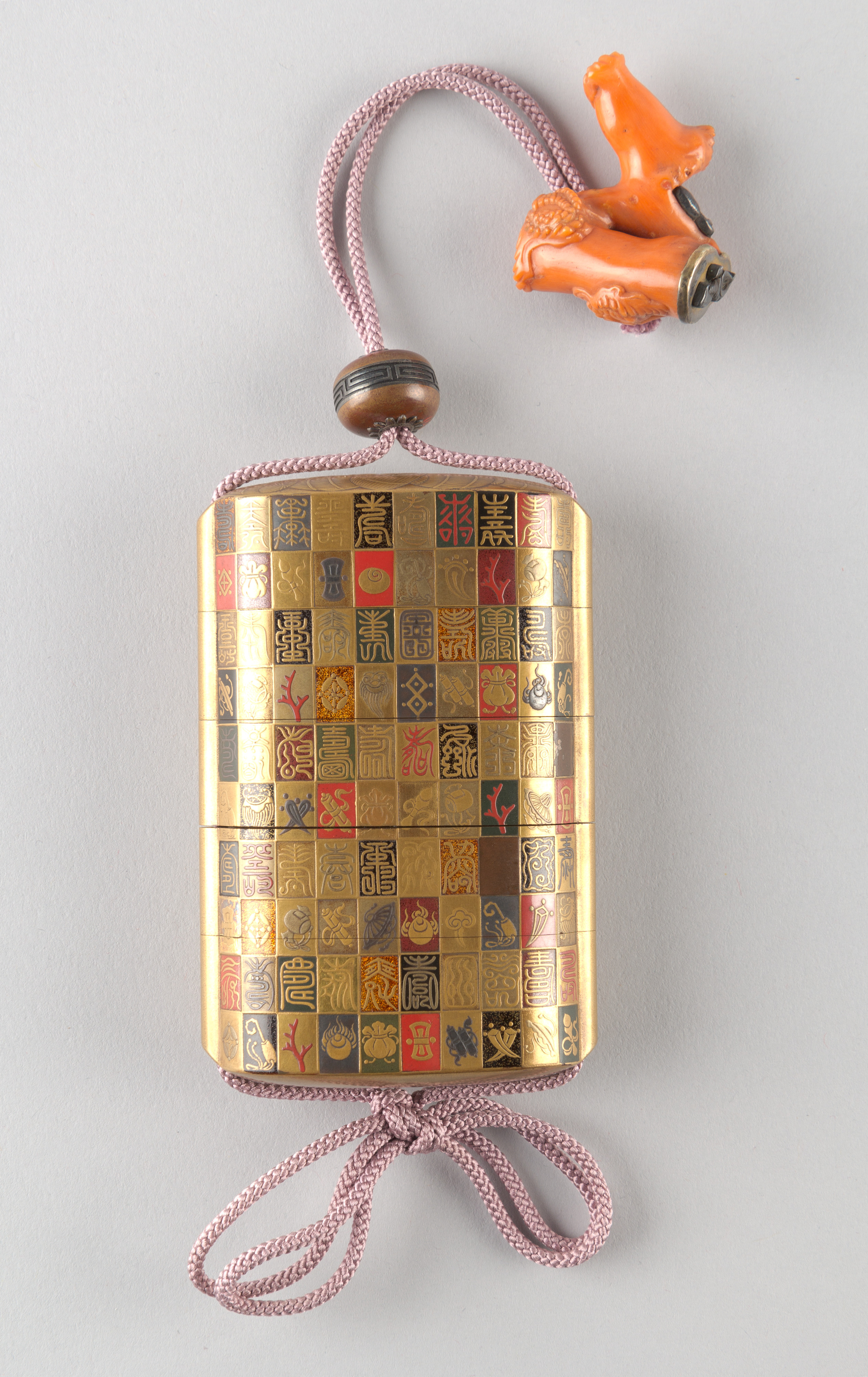
Inro in maki-e Lacquer, Edo period Japan, 18th century

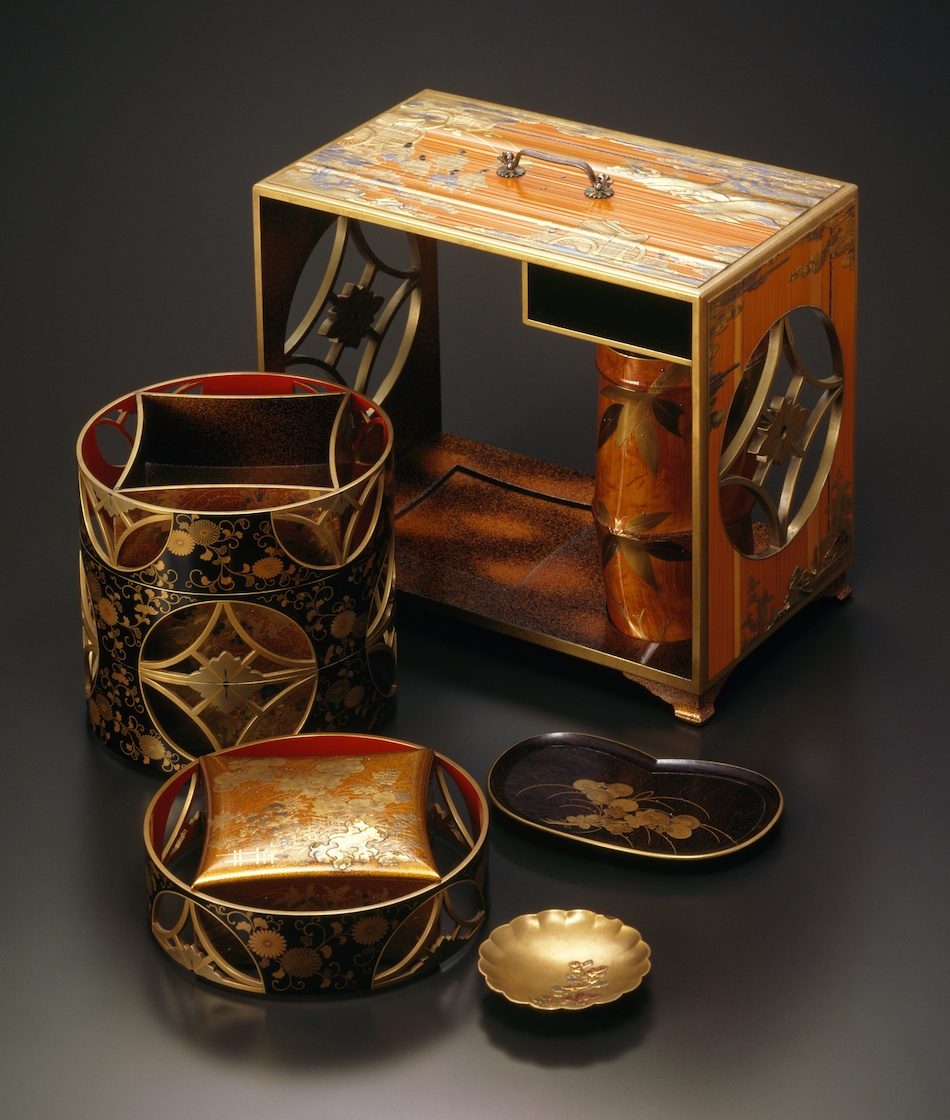
Picnic Box with Design of the Scene from The Tale of Genji in Maki-e Lacquer, Edo or Meiji period Japan, 19th century

=== Types of lacquer ===
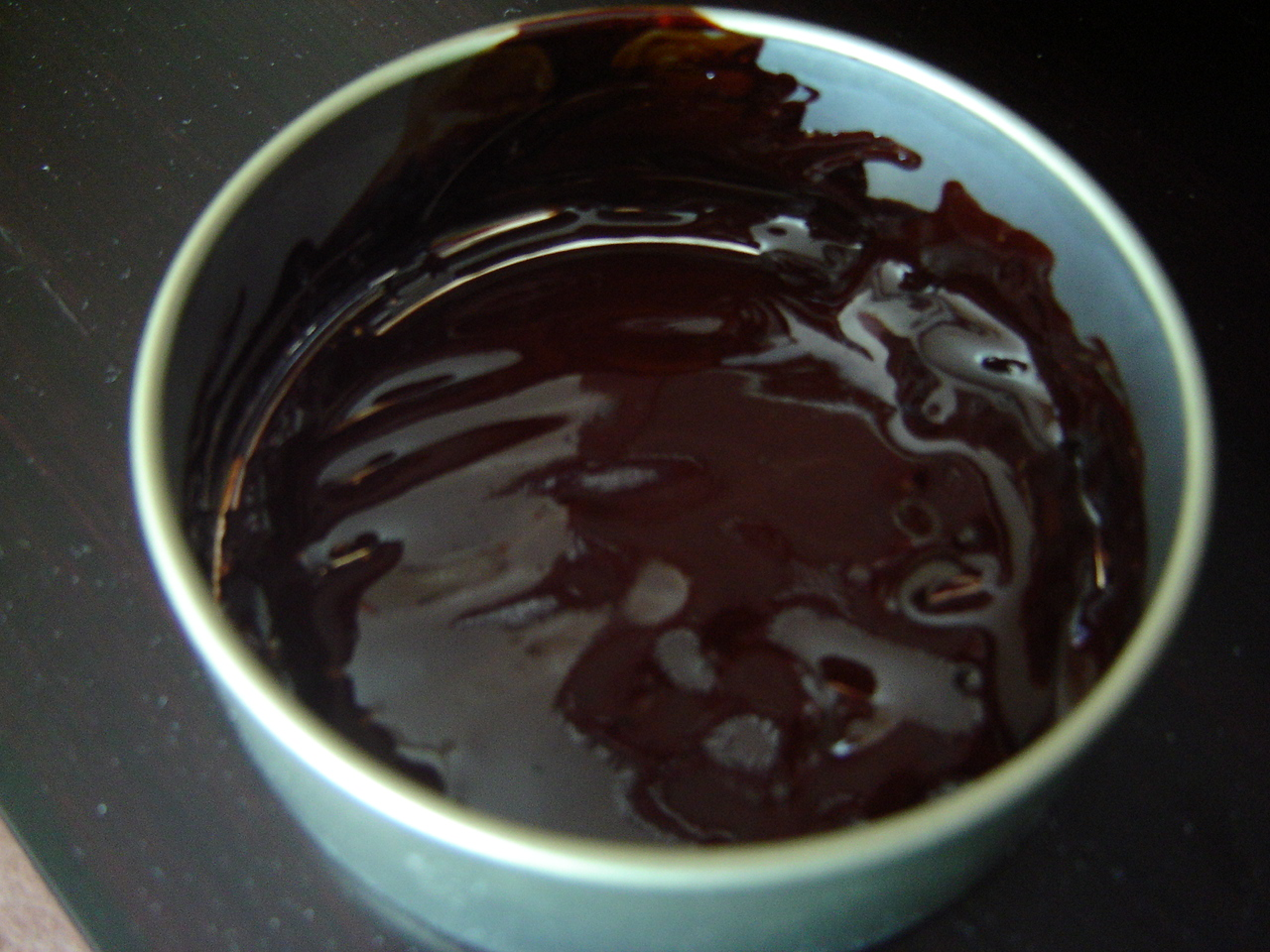
Lacquer mixed with water and turpentine, ready for applying to surface.

Types of lacquer vary from place to place but they can be divided into unprocessed and processed categories.

The basic unprocessed lacquer is called raw lacquer (生漆: ki-urushi in Japanese, shengqi in Chinese). This is directly from the tree itself with some impurities filtered out. Raw lacquer has a water content of around 25% and appears in a light brown colour. This comes in a standard grade made from Chinese lacquer, which is generally used for ground layers by mixing with a powder, and a high-quality grade made from Japanese lacquer called kijomi-urushi (生正味漆) which is used for the last finishing layers.

The processed form (in which the lacquer is stirred continuously until much of the water content has evaporated) is called guangqi (光漆) in Chinese but comes under many different Japanese names depending on the variation, for example, kijiro-urushi (木地呂漆) is standard transparent lacquer sometimes used with pigments and kuroroiro-urushi (黒呂色漆) is the same but pre-mixed with iron hydroxide to produce a black coloured lacquer. Nashiji-urushi (梨子地漆) is the transparent lacquer but mixed with gamboge to create a yellow-tinged lacquer and is especially used for the sprinkled-gold technique. These lacquers are generally used for the middle layers. Japanese lacquers of this type are generally used for the top layers and are prefixed by the word jo- (上) which means 'top (layer)'.

Processed lacquers can have oil added to them to make them glossy, for example, shuai-urushi (朱合漆) is mixed with linseed oil. Other specialist lacquers include ikkake-urushi (釦漆) which is thick and used mainly for applying gold or silver leaf.

=== Identification and analysis ===
Non-invasive methods of characterising lacquer and understanding its condition include optical and digital microscopy, X-ray radiography and computed tomography, X-ray fluorescence, and spectroscopic techniques such as fibre optic reflectance spectroscopy and Raman spectroscopy. Invasive and/or destructive techniques include optical and digital microscopy—including with UV illumination, scanning electron microscopy, energy dispersive X-ray spectrometry, Fourier-transform infrared spectroscopy, X-ray photoelectron spectroscopy, time-of-flight secondary-ion mass spectrometry, field desorption mass spectrometry, and enzyme-linked immunosorbent assay, and importantly, analytical pyrolysis coupled to gas chromatography and mass spectrometry (GCMS).

== Nitrocellulose lacquers ==
Solvent-based dipping lacquers that contain nitrocellulose, a resin obtained from the nitration of cotton and other cellulosic materials, debuted in the 19th century along with nitrocellulose's other commercial applications. They were used, for example, on brass items such as musical instruments. Faster-drying and more durable versions of these lacquers were developed in the early 1920s, when the end of the WWI caused a massive overcapacity of nitrocellulose production, and soon greatly displaced much use of the slower-drying paints and lacquers that preceded them; they were extensively used in the automotive industry and others for the next 30 years until further chemical advancements replaced them. Prior to their introduction, mass-produced automotive finishes were limited in colour, damaged easily, and took a long time to dry, with Japan black being the fastest drying and thus the most economical to use.

The problem with using nitrocellulose in lacquers was its high viscosity, which necessitated dilution of the product with large amounts of thinner for application, leaving only a very thin film of finish not durable enough for outdoor use. This problem was overcome by decreasing the viscosity of the polymer (the term actually post-dates the empirical solution, with Staudinger's modern structural theory explaining polymer solution viscosity by length of molecular chains not yet experimentally proven in 1920s) with heat treatments, either with 2% of mineral acid or in an autoclave at considerable pressure.

The first practical nitrocellulose enamel Glossy White S.2567, still for interior use, was introduced in 1919 in the UK by Nobel Explosives. In 1923, General Motors' Oakland brand automobile was the first to introduce one of the new fast-drying nitrocellulose lacquers, a bright blue, produced by DuPont under their Duco tradename. In 1924 the other GM makes followed suit, and by 1925 nitrocellulose lacquers were thoroughly disrupting the traditional paint business for automobiles, appliances, furniture, musical instruments, caskets, and other products. Henry Ford and, in the UK, Herbert Austin were introducing nitrocellulose lacquers at the same time, and soon the market flourished.

Nitrocellulose lacquers are also used to make firework fuses waterproof. The nitrocellulose and other resins and plasticizers are dissolved in the solvent, and each coat of lacquer dissolves some of the previous coat. These lacquers were a huge improvement over earlier automobile and furniture finishes, both in ease of application and in colour retention. The preferred method of applying quick-drying lacquers is by spraying, and the development of nitrocellulose lacquers led to the first extensive use of spray guns. Nitrocellulose lacquers produce a hard yet flexible, durable finish that can be polished to a high sheen. Drawbacks of these lacquers include the hazardous nature of the solvent, which is flammable and toxic, and the hazards of nitrocellulose in the manufacturing process. The lacquer grade of soluble nitrocellulose is closely related to the more highly nitrated form which is used to make explosives. They become relatively non-toxic after approximately a month since, at this point, the lacquer has evaporated most of the solvents used in its production.

== Acrylic lacquers ==
Lacquers using acrylic resin, a synthetic polymer, were developed in the 1950s. Acrylic resin is colourless, transparent thermoplastic, obtained by the polymerization of derivatives of acrylic acid. Acrylic is also used in enamel paints, which have the advantage of not needing to be buffed to obtain a shine. Enamels, however, are slow drying. The advantage of acrylic lacquer is its exceptionally fast drying time. The use of lacquers in automobile finishes was discontinued when tougher, more durable, weather- and chemical-resistant two-component polyurethane coatings were developed. The system usually consists of a primer, colour coat and clear topcoat, commonly known as clear coat finishes.

== Water-based lacquers ==
Due to health risks and environmental considerations involved in the use of solvent-based lacquers, much work has gone into the development of water-based lacquers. Such lacquers are considerably less toxic, more environmentally friendly, and, in many cases, produce acceptable results. While water-based lacquer's fumes are considerably less hazardous, and it does not have the combustibility issues of solvent-based lacquers, the product still dries fairly quickly. Even though its odor is weaker, water-based lacquers can still produce airborne particulates that can get into the lungs, so proper protective wear still needs to be worn. More and more water-based colored lacquers are replacing solvent-based clear and colored lacquers in under-hood and interior applications in the automobile and other similar industrial applications. Water-based lacquers are used extensively in wood furniture finishing as well.

One drawback of water-based lacquer is that it has a tendency to be highly reactive to other fresh finishes such as quick-dry primer (excluding waterborne lacquer primers), caulking and even some paints that have a paint/primer aspect. Tannin bleed-through can also be an issue, depending on the brand of lacquer used. Once it happens, there is no easy fix as the lacquer is so reactive to other products.

Water-based lacquer used for wood finishing is also not rated for exterior wear, unless otherwise specified.

== Japanning ==
Just as china is a common name for porcelain, japanning is an old name to describe the European technique to imitate Asian lacquerware. As Asian lacquer work became popular in England, France, the Netherlands, and Spain in the 17th century, the Europeans developed imitation techniques. The European technique, which is used on furniture and other objects, uses finishes that have a resin base similar to shellac. The technique, which became known as japanning, involves applying several coats of varnish which are each heat-dried and polished. In the 18th century, japanning gained a large popular following. Although traditionally a pottery and wood coating, japanning was the popular (mostly black) coating of the accelerating metalware industry. By the twentieth century, the term was freely applied to coatings based on various varnishes and lacquers besides the traditional shellac.

== See also ==
- Lacquerware
- Varnish
- Acetate disc
- Cupping tester
- Lacquer painting
- Dry lacquer
