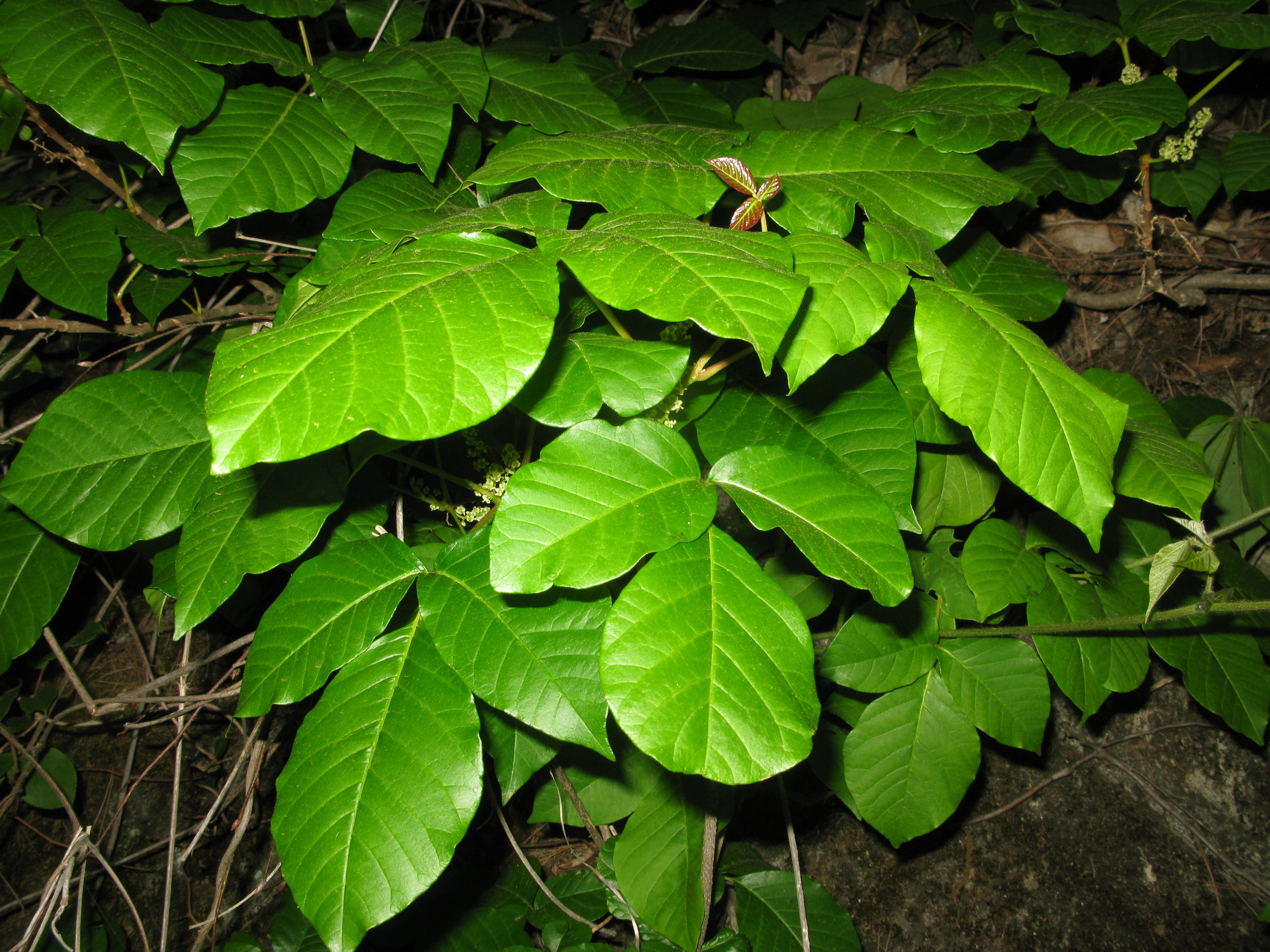
- Fukushima Prefecture, Japan

Scientific classification
- Kingdom: Plantae
- Clade: Tracheophytes
- Clade: Angiosperms
- Clade: Eudicots
- Clade: Rosids
- Order: Sapindales
- Family: Anacardiaceae
- Genus: Toxicodendron
- Species: T. orientale

Binomial name
- Toxicodendron orientale Greene

= Toxicodendron orientale =

Species of flowering plant

Toxicodendron orientale (Asian poison ivy) is an East Asian flowering plant in the genus Toxicodendron. It is a poison ivy, which can cause urushiol-induced contact dermatitis.

== Description ==
Toxicodendron orientale is a climbing vine that grows on trees or other supports. The deciduous leaves of T. orientale are trifoliate and grow to be 3–10 centimetres (1 1/4–4 in) in length. Young branches are covered with small brown hairs that turn into red lenticels as the branches mature.

T. orientale flowers from May to June. The small yellow-green flowers grow in groups from the leaf axils. From August to September, the flowers mature into yellow-brown fruit.

Examples from Fukushima Prefecture
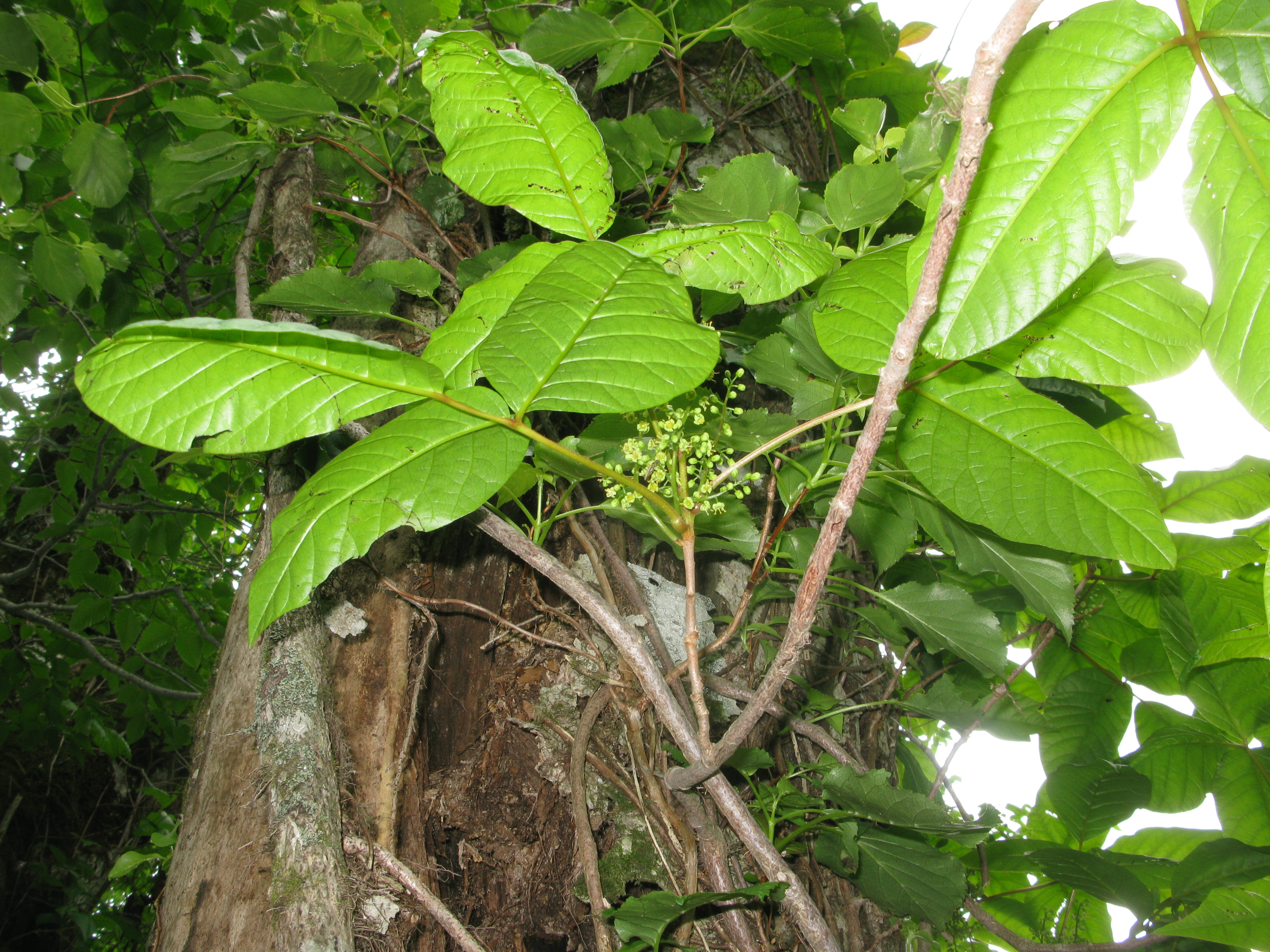
Branch underside

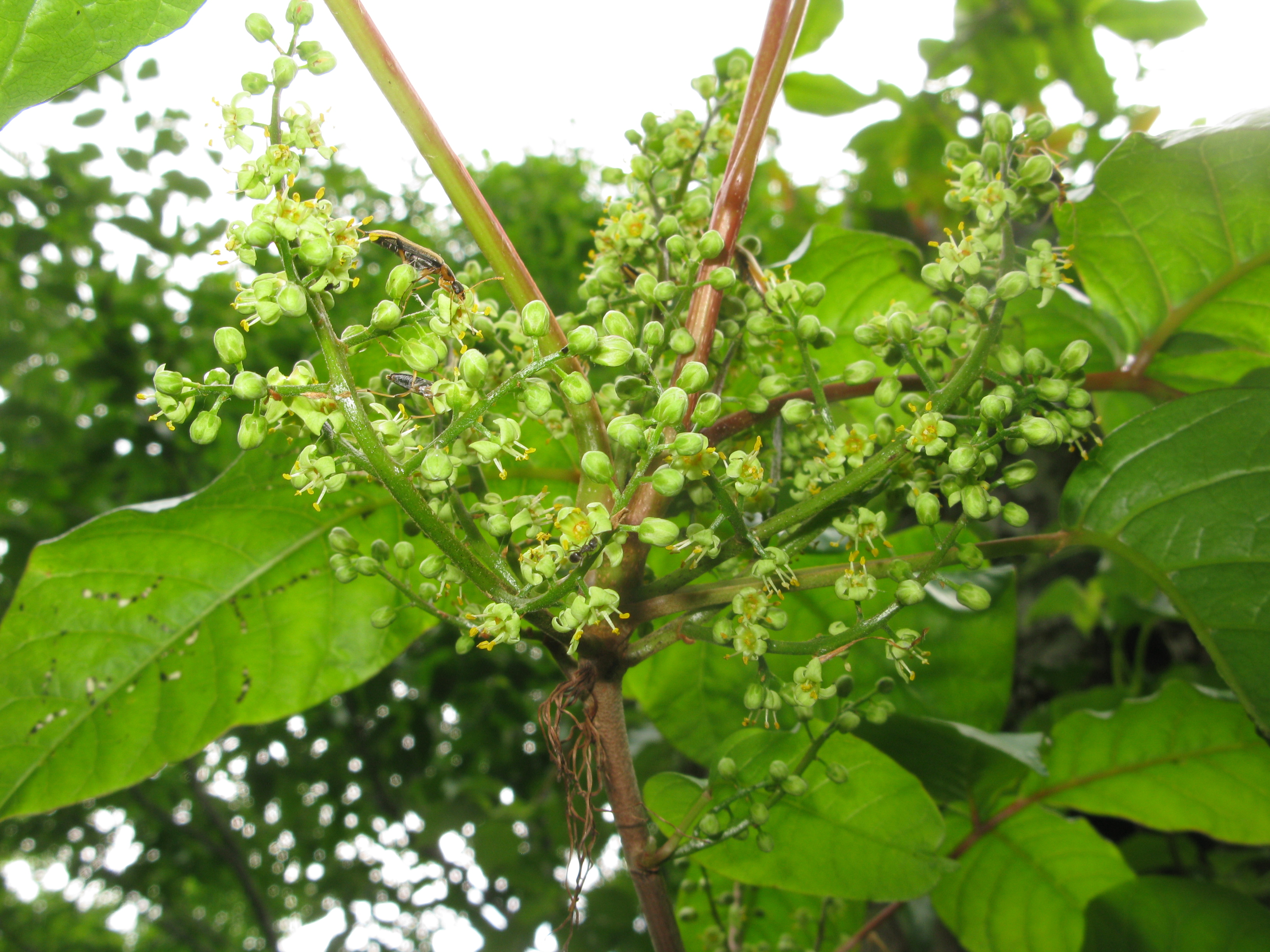
Male flowers

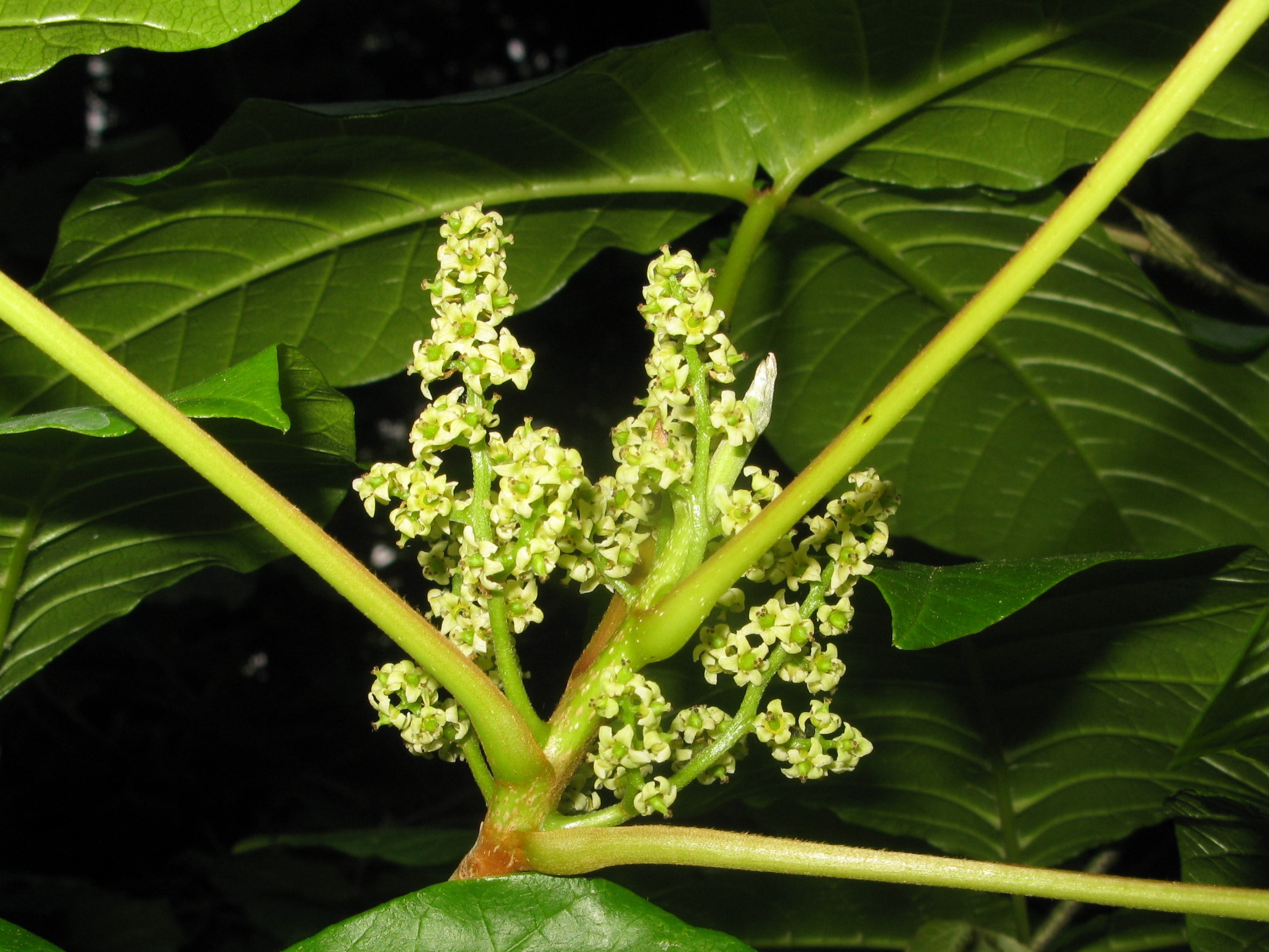
Female flowers

== Taxonomy ==
The species was first characterized and named by Edward Lee Greene in 1905.

== Distribution and habitat ==
It is known to grow in Sakhalin, Japan, Taiwan, South central China, and South Korea. It was introduced to parts of Uzbekistan.

== Toxicity ==
All parts of Toxicodendron orientale contain urushiol, which is known to cause severe contact dermatitis.
