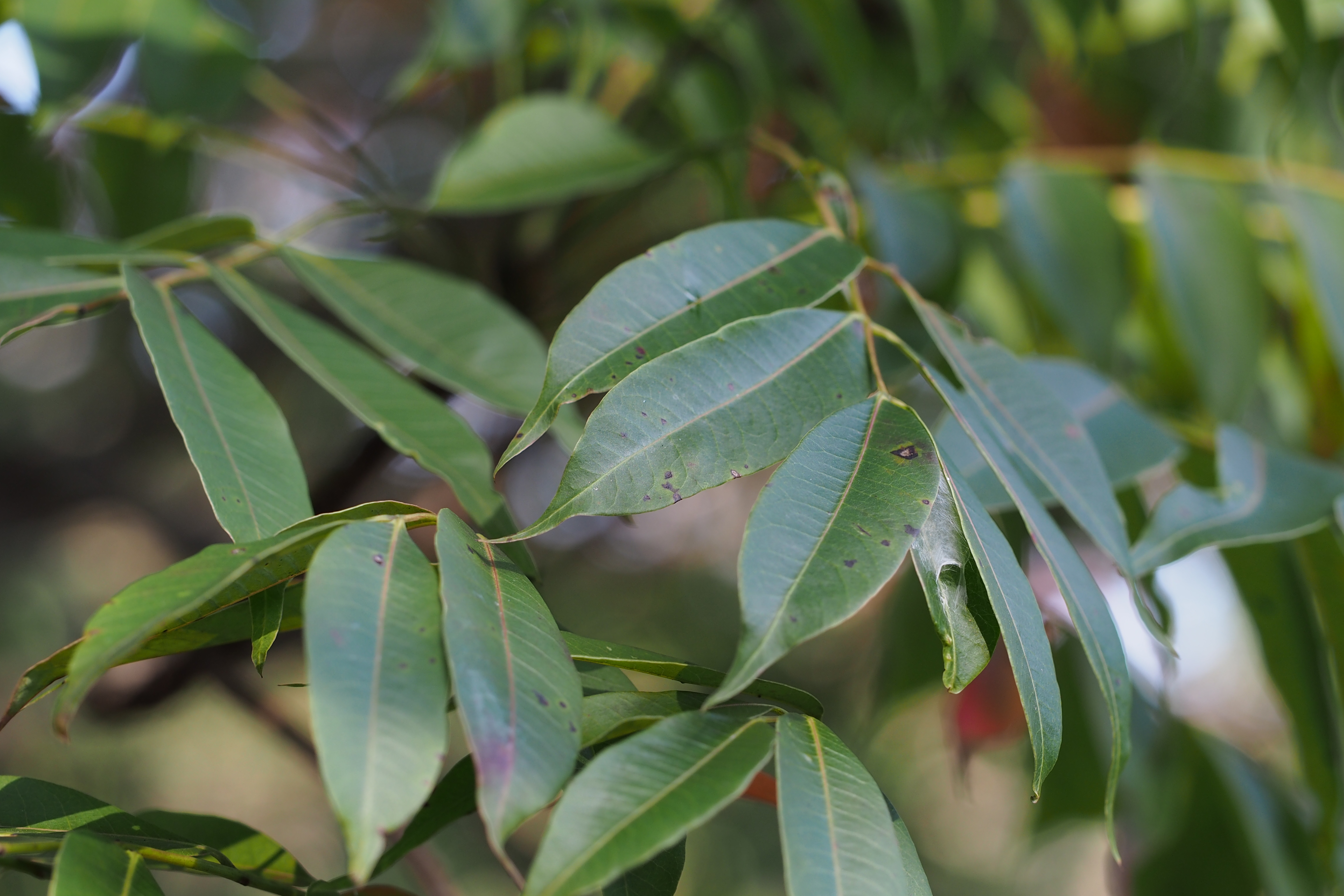
- Leaves
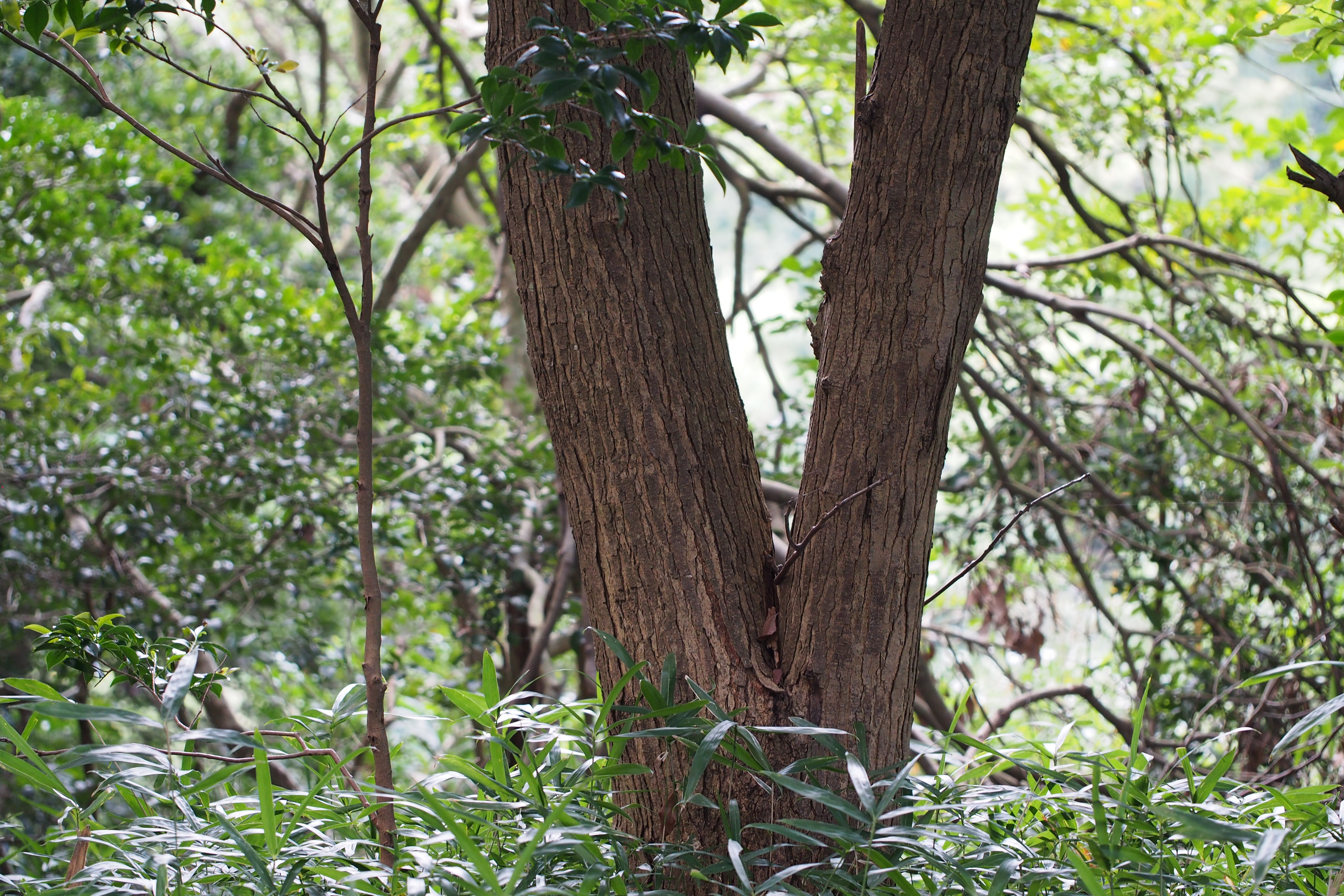
- Trunks

Conservation status
- Least Concern (IUCN 3.1)

Scientific classification
- Kingdom: Plantae
- Clade: Tracheophytes
- Clade: Angiosperms
- Clade: Eudicots
- Clade: Rosids
- Order: Sapindales
- Family: Anacardiaceae
- Genus: Toxicodendron
- Species: T. sylvestre

Binomial name
- Toxicodendron sylvestre (Siebold & Zucc.) Kuntze

Synonyms
- Rhus sylvestris Siebold & Zucc.

= Toxicodendron sylvestre =

Species of plant

Toxicodendron sylvestre, the mountain lacquer tree or wood lacquer tree, is a species of flowering plant in the sumac family Anacardiaceae. It is native to southern China, Taiwan, South Korea, Japan, and the Ryukyu Islands. A deciduous tree reaching 10 m (33 ft), it is typically found in forests at elevations from 100 to 800 m (300 to 2,600 ft), occasionally higher.
