= Enzo Creek Nature Sanctuary =

Protected area in Michigan, United States

Coordinates: 43°42′58″N 85°26′49″W

Enzo Creek Nature Sanctuary, named after the creek that divides the sanctuary north to south, is a 200-acre (0.81 km^{2}) privately managed wildlife sanctuary located in Mecosta County, Michigan, near the city of Big Rapids.

== Land ==
The terrain at Enzo Creek is incredibly diverse. From non-tidal marsh to mature northern hardwoods, the land is fertile and nurtures a healthy vibrant ecosystem. The landscape is rolling in elevation, and no less than 13 soil types are found throughout. Rocky deposits are found throughout Enzo Creek, a result of Michigan's last glacial retreat about 14,000 years ago. It is the sanctuary's diversity of habitat that is the foundation upon which Enzo Creek's wildlife management plan has found success. The mineral and oil composition of Enzo Creek is largely unknown, although areas of Mecosta County are known to have abundant reserves of crude oil.

== Water ==
Four highly eutrophic ponds are located on the property. Most are no more than three feet deep, and were formed as a result of beavers damming flowing water.

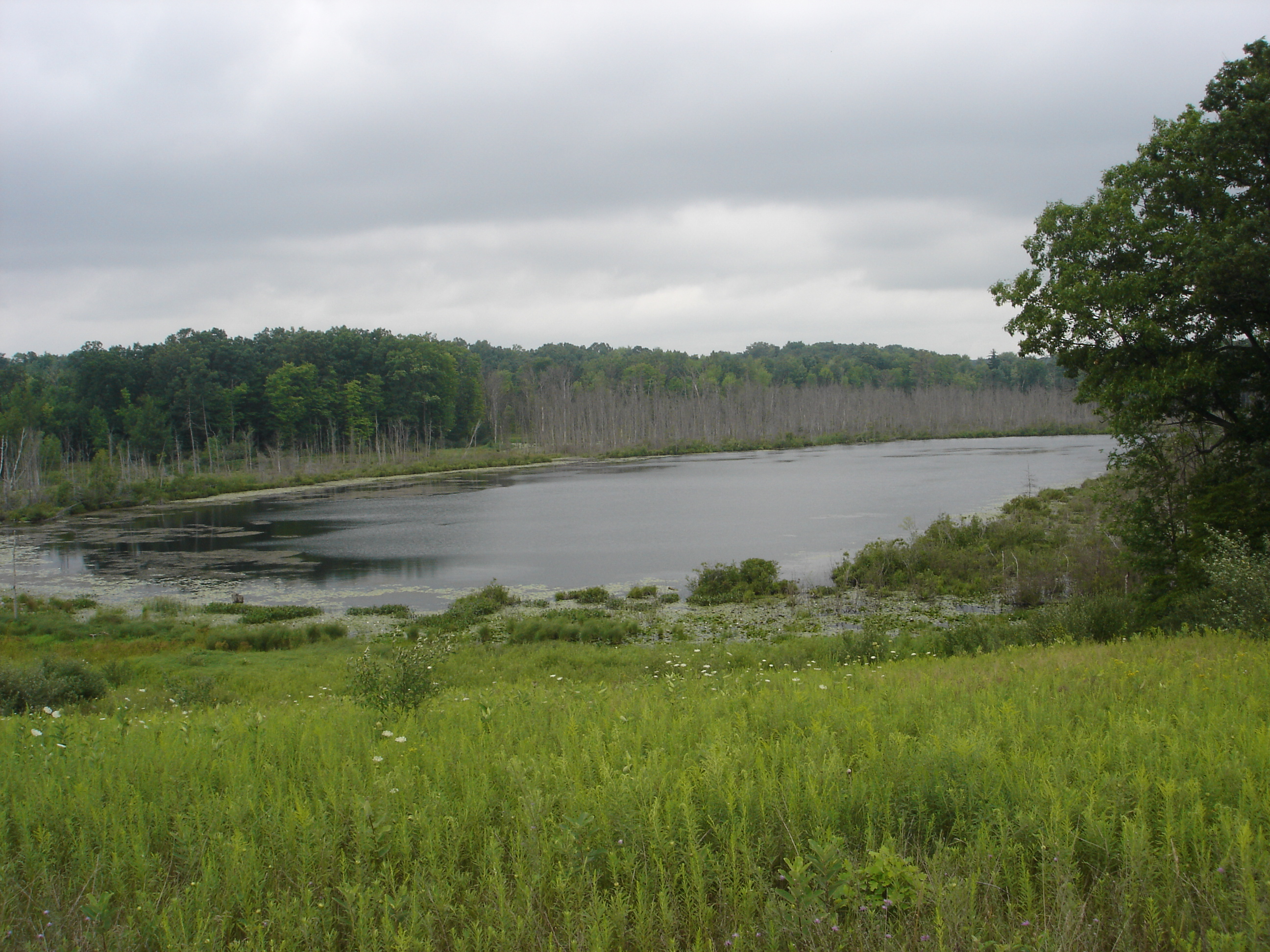
Hunt Lake

The largest body of water is Townline Lake, which is 73 acres (300,000 m^{2}) in size. The sanctuary has nearly 1/4 mile frontage on the Southwest shore of the lake.

Hunt Lake is 10 acres (40,000 m^{2}) in size and has an 11-acre (45,000 m^{2}) area of flooded timber at the north end of the lake which is known as Hunt Marsh. Hunt Marsh is a result of this same beaver activity creating the impoundment blocking Enzo Creek, the only outlet to Hunt Lake. Hunt Lake has a maximum depth of 30 feet (9.1 m), and visibility generally exceeds 5 feet (1.5 m), despite a marl substrate.

Enzo Creek, the creek for which the sanctuary owes its name, flows South and Easterly and joins the outlet to Townline Lake. Enzo Creek flows approximately 1.3 miles from its beginning at Hunt Lake before it joins Ryan Creek, which then flows into the Muskegon River watershed.

Beaver Pipes were installed in 2009 by Enzo Creek's management to help control the water level in Hunt Marsh, which had been steadily growing since 2005. This method of water control proved to be ineffective as beavers were able to block water passage through the pipes. The beaver pipes were ultimately removed completely, and a much larger 20" culvert pipe was installed through the dam and encased with hog wire fencing to prevent beavers from stuffing the pipe full of timber to block water passage. Over the course of a single year, beavers were able to dam the area around the hog wire fencing and again gain control of the water level. Work is ongoing to try and reach a permanent solution to water level control on Hunt Lake.

Nehmer Lake is also accessible from the sanctuary. It is approximately 8 acres (32,000 m^{2}) in size, and although shallower than Hunt Lake, it has a littoral zone of flooded timber along its margins. The maximum depth is unknown.

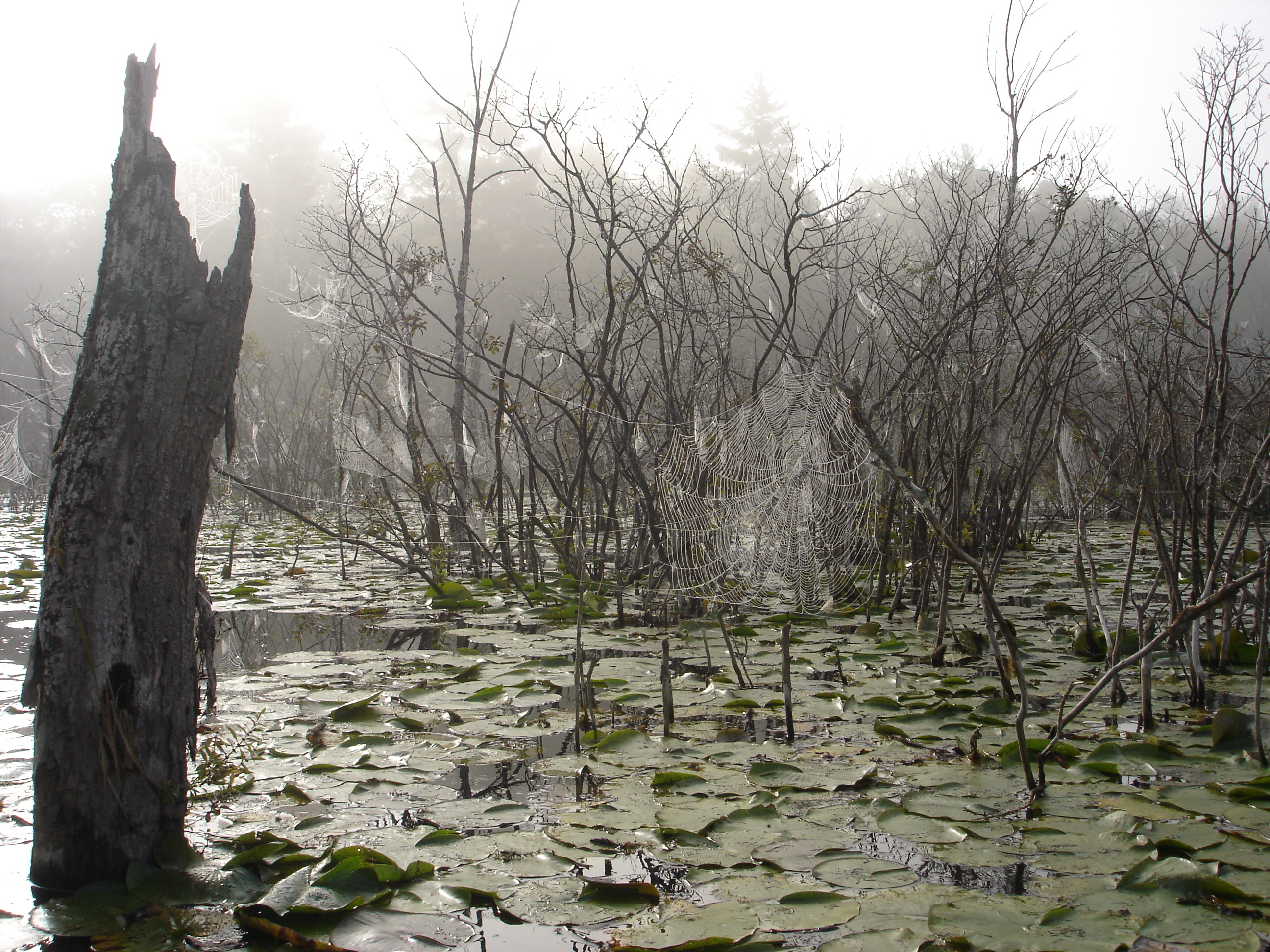
Spider webs in Hunt Marsh

== Flora ==
The flora found at Enzo Creek have yet to be comprehensively inventoried, as the project would be a colossal undertaking. Tree types include deciduous species such as pin oak, white oak, red oak, sugar maple, aspen, ash, birch, cherry, apple, sassafras, American hornbeam, ironwood, and walnut trees. Coniferous species include jack pine, red pine, eastern white pine, eastern hemlock, arborvitae, Scots pine, and blue spruce.

Selective harvest of aspen was done in 2003 to improve habitat for ruffed grouse and other upland birds such as the wild turkey. Low impact selective harvest proved to be a successful project.

Since 2006, several stands of conifers have been planted for future economic timber value and also to provide dense cover for several wildlife species. Approximately 8,000 red pines were planted in a 2-acre (8,100 m^{2}) stand primarily for future economic timber value and 1500 jack pine were planted in a fallow area with poor soil types suitable for jack pine but not conducive to forage plants to serve as a future area of dense cover for wildlife.

There are several other tree species including tamarack larch which is known as a deciduous conifer and hence loses its needles each autumn. Staghorn sumac is abundant in many areas of the sanctuary.

Elaeagnus umbellata (autumn olive) was planted in the 1950s under the recommendation of the then Michigan Department of Conservation (now the Michigan Department of Natural Resources), as the shrub was believed to be very beneficial to wildlife. It is now known to be invasive, and an 8-acre (32,000 m^{2}) area was cut back in 2006 and converted to a hayland.

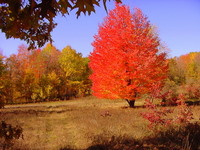
Enzo Creek in October

Wildflowers are found in every season except winter. Cardinal flower, Indian paintbrush, touch-me-not, multiflora rose and trout lily serve only as examples.

Aquatic flora is abundant and diverse. Wetland species such as narrow leaf cattails, horsetail, and giant reed are abundant. The Hunt Marsh is covered with duckweed for several months in the summer where patches of white water lily can also be found. Poison sumac is common in Hunt Marsh. Winterberry (also known as Michigan holly) is a colorful addition to Hunt Marsh in the winter when the marsh's greenery subsides in late fall. It also provides an abundant forage base for many wild birds.

== Fauna ==
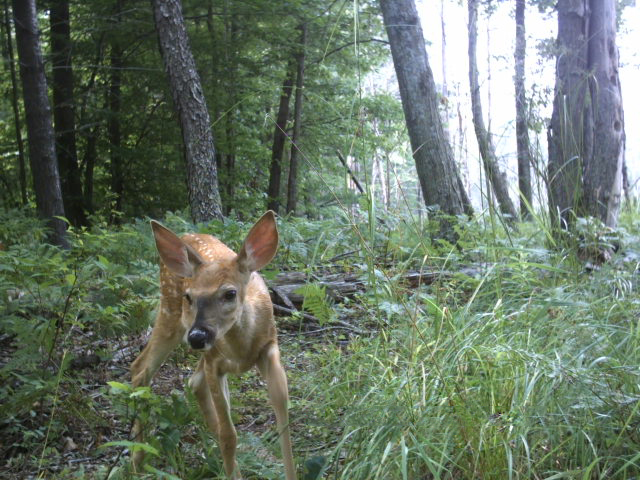
A whitetail fawn at Enzo Creek

The fauna found at Enzo Creek Nature Sanctuary is as diverse as its flora. It is the abundance of appropriate habitat which makes it possible to view wildlife within the sanctuary. On any given day, one may see white-tailed deer, fox, bobcat, wild turkey, cottontail rabbit, squirrels (eastern, red, and fox), coyote, raccoon, porcupine, ruffed grouse, and ring-necked pheasant.

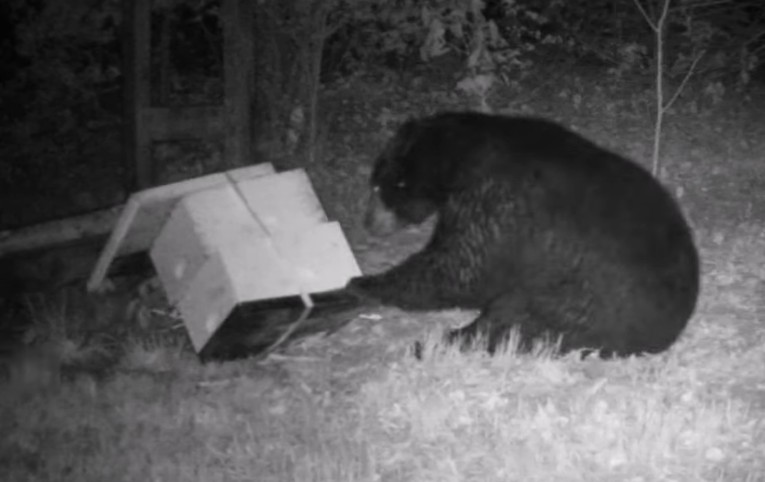
Black Bear Destroys Honey Bee Hive

A black bear sighting is not impossible, as black bear have been observed on the sanctuary on multiple occasions. Most recently, in May 2023, a black bear became a regular visitor and was observed on trail cameras taking a fondness to a honey bee hive causing several hundred dollars damage and destroying multiple colonies. In 2007, the Michigan Department of Natural Resources extended the range for bear hunting to include Mecosta County due in part to their sustainable abundance. .

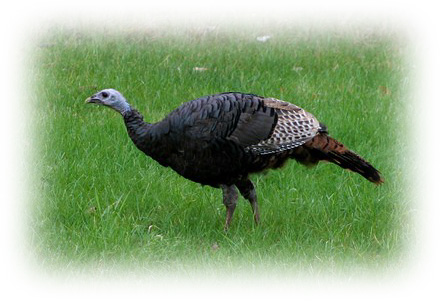
A hen wild turkey at Enzo Creek

The most recent species of interest to be identified at Enzo Creek is the northern flying squirrel as a pair was seen gliding from tree to tree in November 2011.

The abundance of wildlife is spectacular at the Sanctuary. It is the waterfowl habitat that makes Enzo Creek so unique. In autumn, when waterfowl are migrating, Hunt Marsh and Hunt Lake are home to many species of waterfowl. Most abundant are wood duck, mallards, Canada geese, and teal. Loons also take up residence on Hunt Lake, and their presence is known by their unique cry at twilight, although the birds prefer Townline Lake (located 600 ft (180 m) to the east of Enzo Creek) due to its size.

Due to the abundance of waterfowl, Ducks Unlimited conducted extensive research on mallard nesting success at Enzo Creek in 2003. As part of the study, 60 mallard hens were decoy trapped in the early spring and surgically implanted with transmitters. Hens were followed via telemetry from the time of implantation to either 30 days after their brood hatch, complete brood loss, or death. Data from this study was instrumental in helping Ducks Unlimited revise their management plan for Great Lakes mallard populations.

In 2006 one wood duck nesting box was installed at Enzo Creek, and a resident hen successfully hatched two ducklings while taking up residence. In 2007, two additional nesting boxes were installed to help provide optimal nesting habitat. In October 2007 a check was made on one of the nesting boxes installed in the spring, and there was no sign of nesting activity. It is speculated that the abundance of other natural nesting habitat precluded it from use.

Hunt Marsh is also home to the great blue heron, the largest in the heron family with a wing span of seven feet. Kingfishers are observed on a frequent basis as they ambush fish, a staple in their diet.

Hunt Marsh would not exist without the activity of the world's second-largest rodent: the beaver. Beaver remain very active in the marsh and any novice can identify their trademark "stump" left behind. Muskrat are also abundant and seen traveling throughout the lakes, ponds, marsh and even Enzo Creek.

The northern river otter is also prevalent on Hunt Lake and Hunt Marsh. Able to swim for nearly a mile underwater when disturbed, they often seem to disappear without a trace..

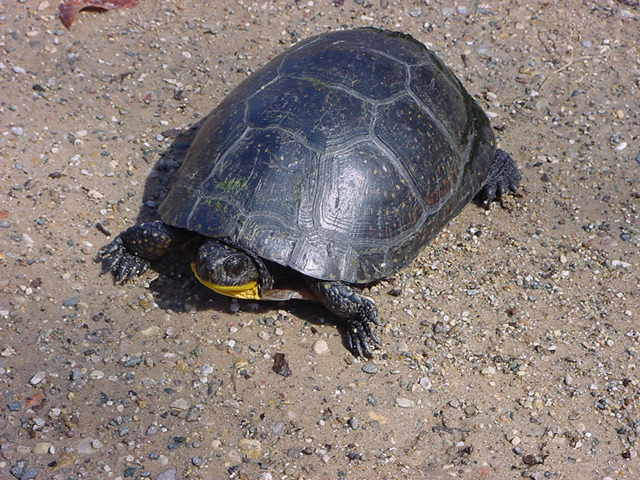
Blanding's turtle is a threatened species.

When observed, they are without question one of the most amazing creatures to observe as they are often socially playful with one another. Of special note is the river otter's acute sensitivity to any form of environmental pollution, as it generally vacates any area with tainted water quality very quickly. Their existence at Enzo Creek is a testament to the water quality within the nature sanctuary

Enzo Creek is home to the Blanding's turtle, which is threatened and even endangered within its range. These turtles do not reach sexual maturity until they are 18–20 years old and may live to be as old as 70 years.

The common snapping turtle can be found in the spring nesting in sandy areas of the preserve. Rarely do they pose a threat if encountered in water, but on land they can be very aggressive if disturbed.

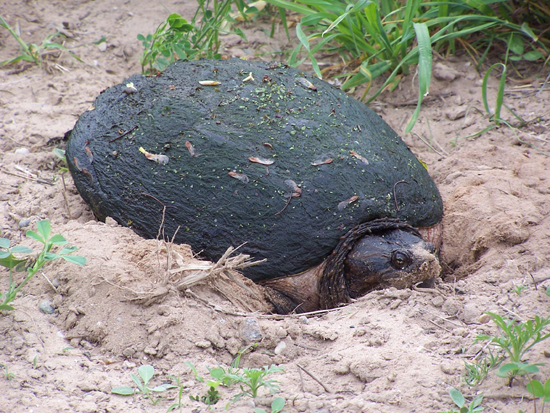
Snapping turtle nesting at Enzo Creek

Another common amphibian is the Blue-spotted salamander which often uses leaf litter and underbrush as a hideout.

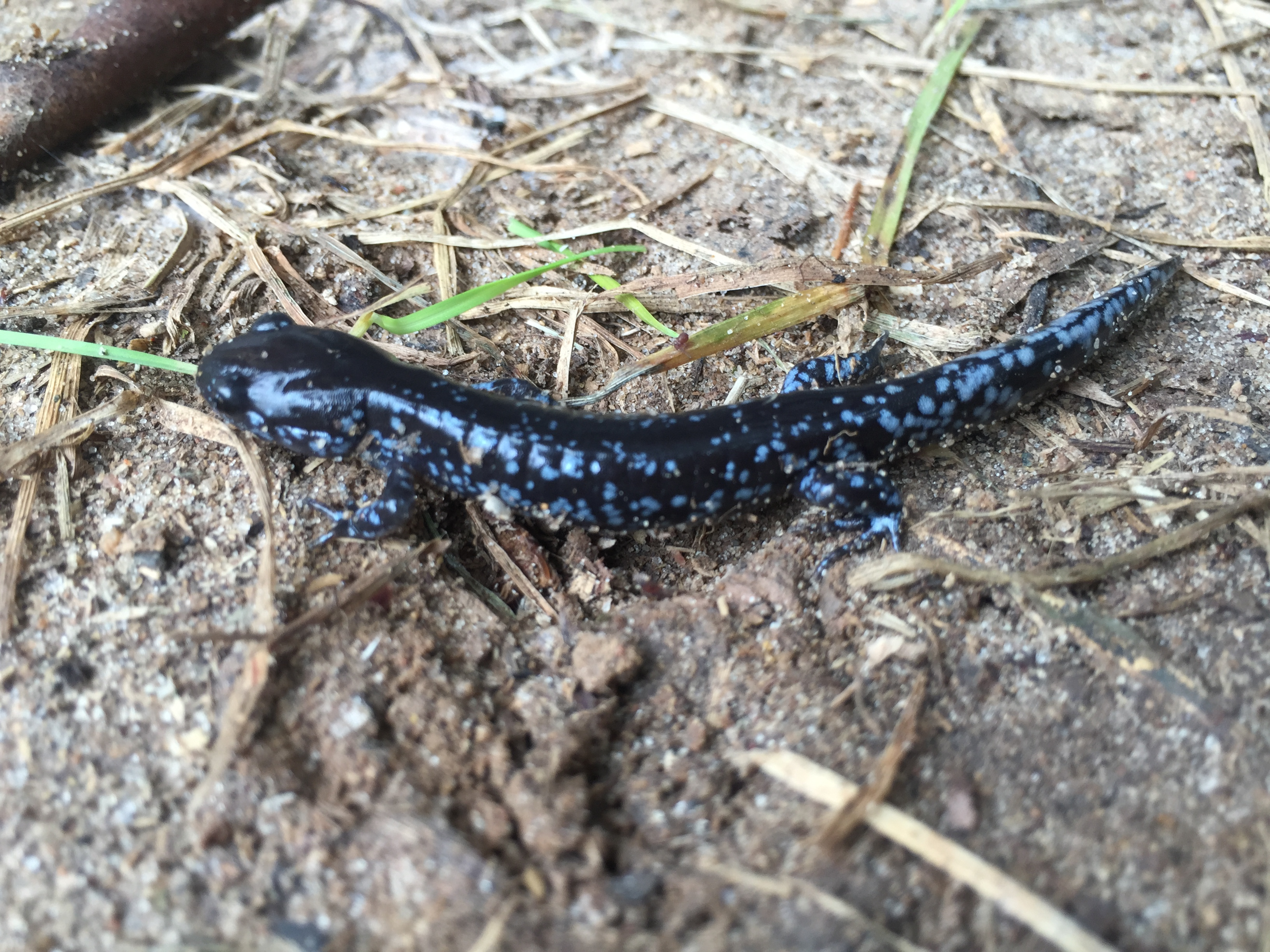
Blue-spotted Salamander

Hunt Lake harbors a vibrant fishery. The northern pike is at the top of the food chain, and considering it is such a small body of water, Hunt's pike are in balance with the forage available in the lake. Most are in the 3–5 year class, but much older fish are also found. Largemouth bass are also part of the food pyramid, but to a much lesser extent. Bluegill, yellow perch, and emerald shiner make up the bulk of the forage base. A complete fishery survey had not yet been completed as of 2007. Strangely, a four-year-old muskellunge was identified in Hunt Lake in 2006, and it unclear if this fish was the sole representative of its species or if a small reproductive population exists.

Nehmer Lake is similar in resources as Hunt Lake. Hybrid sunfish have been stocked on several occasions. However, their survival in abundance has been curtailed due to predation by northern pike.

It is not uncommon to view an American bald eagle soaring low over Hunt Lake or Hunt Marsh. Bald eagles often hunt over the Muskegon River, which is located approximately 1-mile (1.6 km) west of Enzo Creek. Evidence of nesting activity at Enzo Creek was recently observed with the first sighting of a nest under construction in August 2009.

In this same survey, several migratory bufflehead were viewed waddling in a pool below one of Hunt Marsh's several beaver dams. Bufflehead are arguably one of the most colorful species of waterfowl which pass through Enzo Creek each spring and fall. En route from the bird's southern winter range to Canada's boreal forest to nest, they are vulnerable to predation by the bald eagle.
