= Sumac-ade =

Tart drink made from sumac

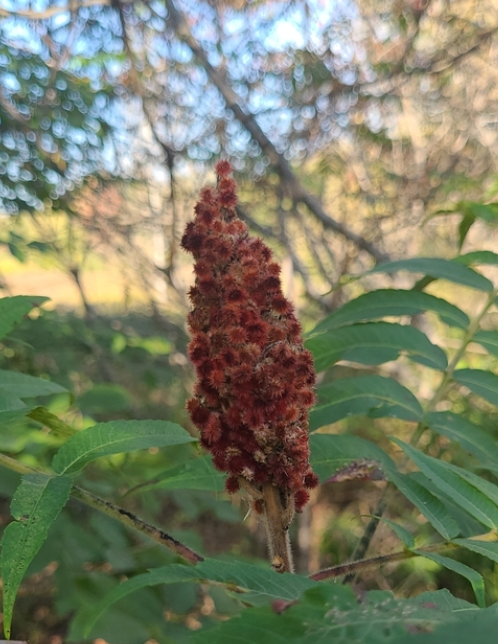
The fruits of Rhus typhina, a species commonly used in sumac-ade

Sumac-ade, also known as bush-lemonade or Indian lemonade, is a drink normally made with Rhus typhina or Rhus coriaria, chilled water, and frequently added, but not always added, sugar. With the taste normally described as tart, yet sweet, the taste bears a shocking resemblance to pink lemonade.

== Process ==
Rhus fruits are briskly rinsed, as they are removed from their stem. The berries are then dunked into a jar of cold or chilled water. After 5 minutes of vigorous shaking to the jar, the concoction is left alone for around 25 minutes. After that, it is shaken and a potato masher is used on the fruit.

Rhus vernix and Rhus radicans are not used as they are highly toxic due to their urushiol content.

== History ==
In the Americas, sumac-ade wasn't created by any modern inventor, but was passed down generations through Native American peoples of the Cahokian tribes of central United States. However, it is now drank by many people in the Northeast United States, and in the Midwestern United States by others, due to widespread trade of the main recipe.

While there was a sumac "drink" commonly made in the Middle East, said "drink" was normally used as a souring agent for jellies and other sweet treats, rather than as its own drink.
