= Tec Laboratories =

Manufacturer of over-the-counter pharmaceutical dermatological preparations

Tec Laboratories, Inc.
- Company type: Private
- Industry: Manufacturing; pharmaceuticals
- Founded: 1977
- Headquarters: Albany, Oregon, United States
- Key people: Robert L. Smith (Founder); Steven D. Smith (CEO); Vern W. Smith (Vice President)
- Owner: Quest Products, LLC
- Website: www.teclabsinc.com

Tec Laboratories, Inc. is a manufacturer of over-the-counter pharmaceutical dermatological preparations. The company was founded in 1977 by a former Mead Johnson executive, chemical engineer Robert L. Smith, and is headquartered in Albany, Oregon. The company's products, including its flagship poison oak scrub, Tecnu, are sold in approximately 47,000 retail outlets which have sold over 53 million units, as of 2014.

== History ==
In the early 1950s, during the Cold War, chemist Dr. Robert Smith invented a waterless skin cleanser for the removal of radioactive dust. In 1962, Smith relocated his family from Indiana to Oregon, where his wife Evelyn Smith, discovered that the cleanser, by then named Tecnu (for “technically new”), had another use. After an exposure to poison oak, to which she knew she was allergic, she washed the affected areas with Tecnu and did not get a rash. After more testing the cleanser was proven successful at removing the rash-causing oil found in the resin urushiol of the native plants poison oak, poison ivy, and poison sumac from skin, clothing, and pets’ fur. Smith also learned that the cleanser removed grease, pitch, sap and even skunk odor. Additional testing was conducted by the Oregon State University Forestry Department.

In 1977, Dr. Smith established Tecnu Enterprises to manufacture his Tecnu scrub for commercial distribution. Initially housed in the family's garage in Corvallis, Oregon, the firm soon moved to a more permanent manufacturing facility in neighboring Albany.

In the mid-1980s, the company name was changed to Tec Laboratories, Inc. As of March 2014, Tec Laboratories occupies a 58,000 square foot building in Albany, employing 35 people on a year-round basis, with additional workers hired during the busy summer season. The company estimates that it has sold 53.3 million units of its various products from the company's establishment in 1977 through the spring of 2014, with some 47,000 retail outlets carrying the company's wares.

In 2024, the company was acquired by Quest Products, LLC, a portfolio company based out of Pleasant Prairie Wisconsin.

== Products ==
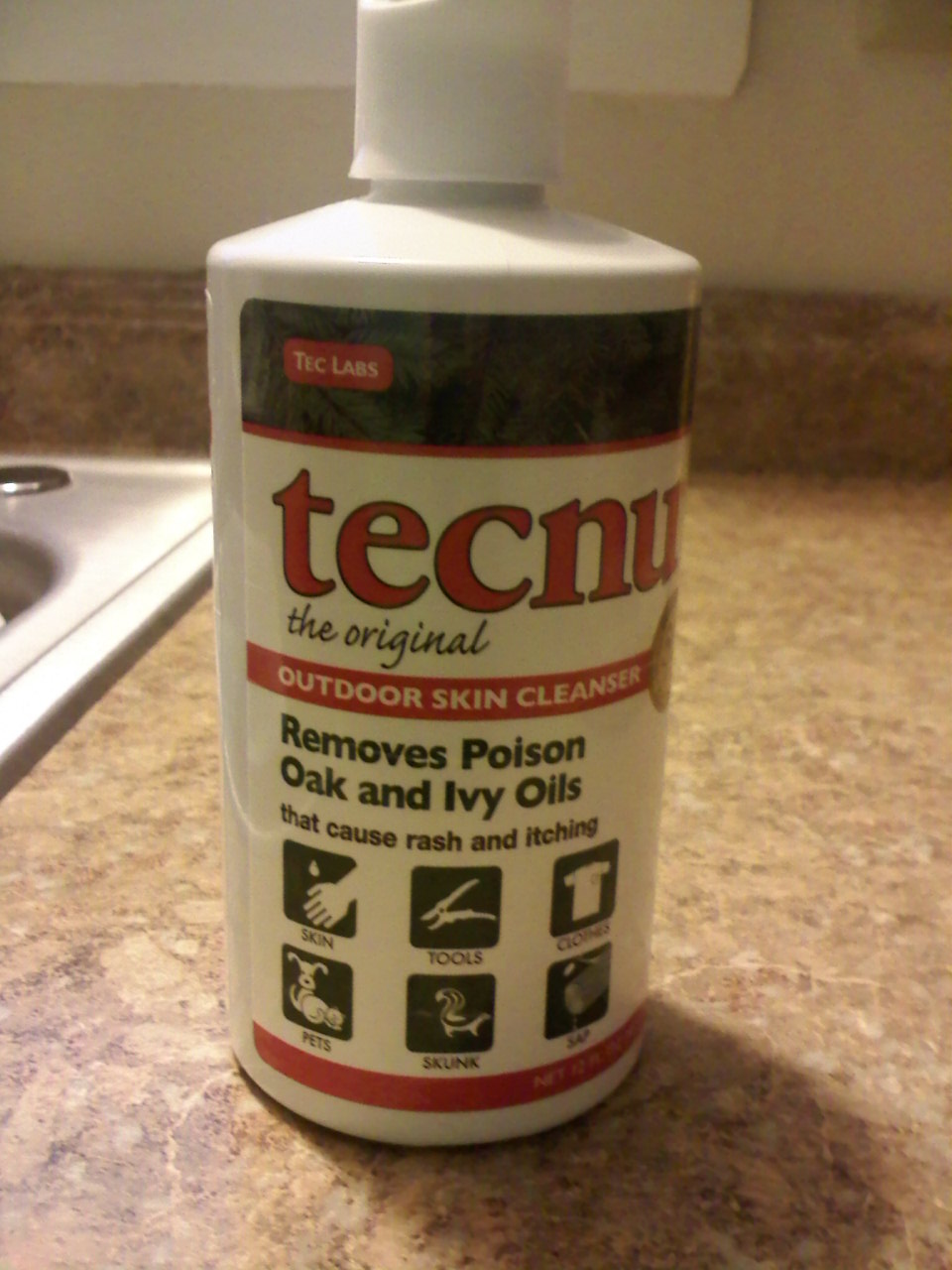
The company's flagship product is Tecnu, a cleanser which prevents the oils which cause poison oak rash from bonding to the skin.

The product line of Tec Laboratories has gradually grown to include additional over-the-counter skin preparations, insect repellents, head lice treatments, and wound care preparations. The firm has expanded from a manufacturer of specialty lines sold mainly to safety suppliers to products that are now available in chain drug stores and other outlets throughout the United States.

The company's products, all manufactured in Albany, include Tecnu Outdoor Skin Cleanser, Tecnu Extreme Poison Ivy Scrub, Tecnu Rash Relief Spray, Licefreee! Non-toxic Lice Killing Hair Gel, Calagel Medicated Anti-itch Gel, 10-Hour Repellent, and Corticool 1% Hydrocortisone Gel. Licefreee was launched in 2011 and was developed by an employee of Tec after she was displeased with the "bug spray" smell emitted by an existing product to treat head lice. By 2013, Licefreee's sales increased to become more than 35 percent of Tec's total sales, resulting in a 48 percent increase in size for the company.

In April 2011, one of the company's products, StaphAseptic First Aid Antiseptic/Pain Relieving Gel, a topical disinfectant and pain reliever found by an Oregon State University study to be more effective than two more common products against community-associated MRSA, was the subject of a warning letter from the United States government's Food and Drug Administration. The letter charged that "as presently formulated, labeled and promoted, this over-the-counter (OTC) product violates provisions of the Federal Food, Drug, and Cosmetic Act" and was "an unapproved new drug" owing to claims made about the effectiveness of some of its ingredients. The company was given 15 days to respond to the warning letter. A product recall was not anticipated. By 2014, Tec Labs' trademarked StaphAseptic name had been discontinued from the company's product roster and a product called Tecnu First Aid Gel introduced.

== Company culture ==
The firm's mission statement is "Tec Labs is a pharmaceutical institution that fosters a culture of innovation, trust, joie de vivre and esprit de corps." Its supervisors are called "coaches", a change made in 1997 when the company moved away from "traditional top-down management" and toward "self-directed work team", and it practices open-book financial management. The company makes use of a so-called "Appreciation Station" in its main hallway to which employees can post thank-you notes for their co-workers. The firm also designates a percentage of its pre-tax profits for its employee profit-sharing plan, paying out $9,000 per worker during calendar year 2013.

The firm has received the Hall of Fame Award from Oregon Business magazine for making that publication's "Oregon Top 100 Small Businesses" list for 12 years. The company is selected frequently as one of Oregon's "100 Best Companies to Work For," including one of the "100 Best Green Companies to Work For in Oregon", and has won numerous business and industry awards.
