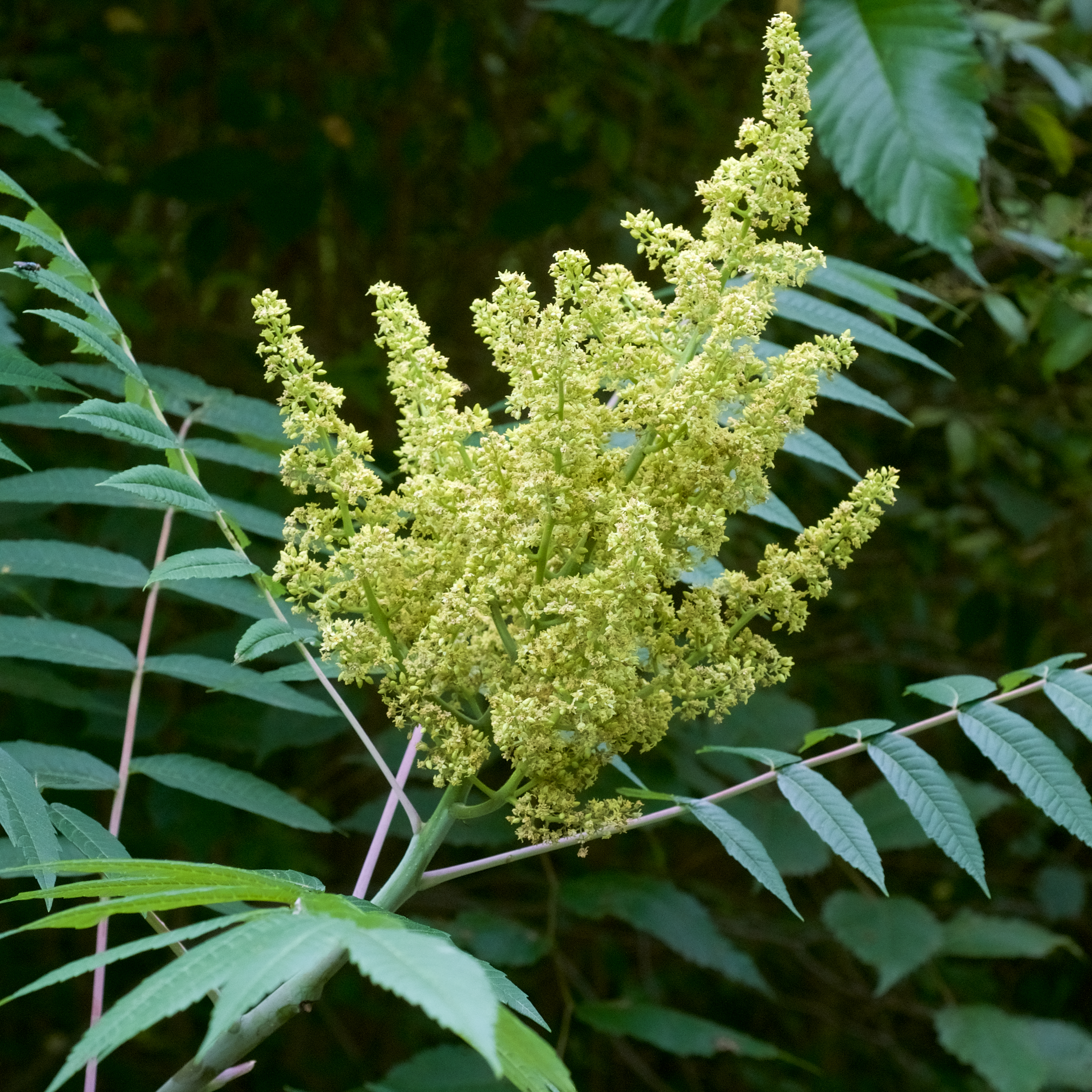
- Rhus glabra flowers

Conservation status
- Least Concern (IUCN 3.1)

Scientific classification
- Kingdom: Plantae
- Clade: Tracheophytes
- Clade: Angiosperms
- Clade: Eudicots
- Clade: Rosids
- Order: Sapindales
- Family: Anacardiaceae
- Genus: Rhus
- Species: R. glabra

Binomial name
- Rhus glabra L.
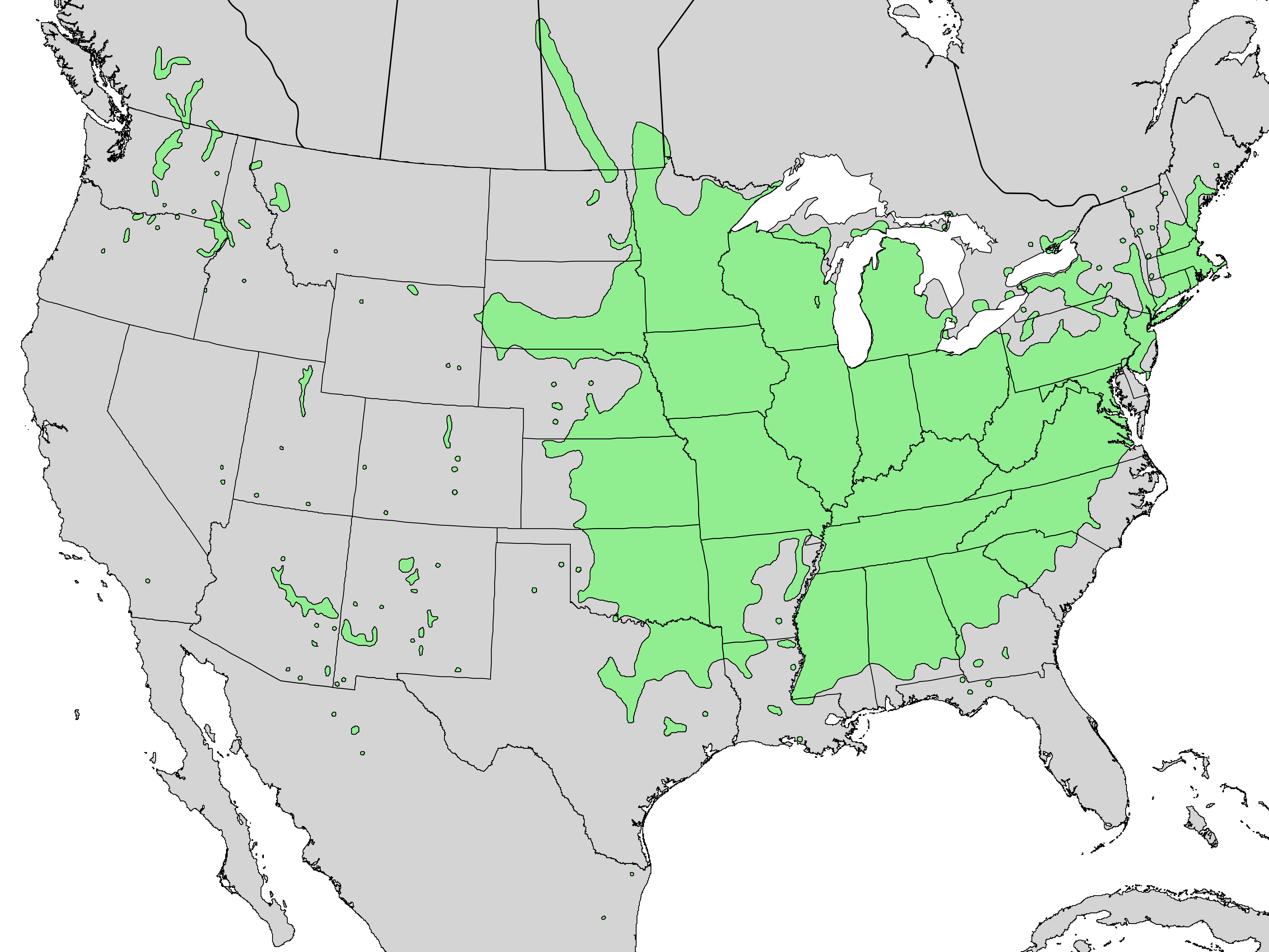
- Natural range of Rhus glabra

= Rhus glabra =

Species of flowering plant

Rhus glabra, the smooth sumac (also known as white sumac, upland sumac, or scarlet sumac), is a North American species of sumac in the family Anacardiaceae.

== Description ==
Smooth sumac has a spreading, open habit, growing up to 3 metres (10 ft) tall. The bark is smooth and gray to brown.

The leaves are alternate, 30–50 centimetres (12–20 in) long, compound with 11–31 oppositely paired leaflets. Each leaflet is 5–13 cm (2–5 in) long, with a serrated margin. The leaves turn scarlet in the fall.

The species is dioecious. The flowers are tiny, green, produced in dense erect panicles 10–25 cm (4–10 in) tall, in the spring, later followed by large panicles of edible crimson berries that remain throughout the winter. The buds are small, covered with brown hair and borne on fat, hairless twigs.

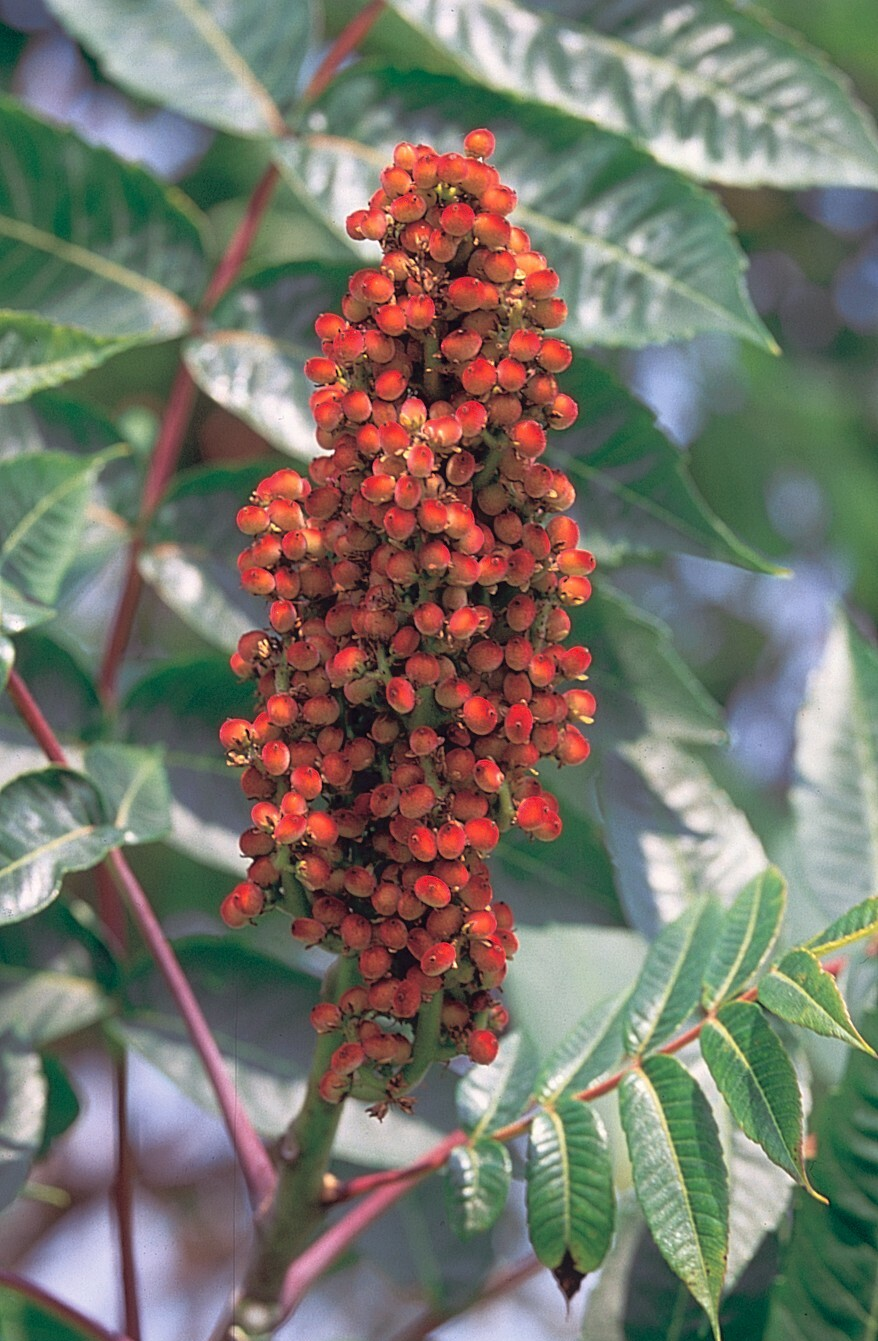
Fruit

== Distribution and habitat ==
It is native to North America, from southern Quebec west to southern British Columbia in Canada, and south to northern Florida and Arizona in the United States and Tamaulipas in northeastern Mexico.

It can be found in a wide variety of habitats, from streambanks to dry and montane slopes.

== Ecology ==
In late summer it sometimes forms galls on the underside of leaves, caused by the parasitic sumac leaf gall aphid, Melaphis rhois. The galls are not harmful to the tree.

== Uses ==
Native Americans ate the young sprouts as a salad. The fruit is sour and contains a large seed, but can be chewed (to alleviate thirst) and made into a lemonade-like drink. Deer forage the twigs and fruit.

In 2020, archaeologists unearthed a pipe at a dig in Central Washington state, showing chemical evidence that a Native American tribe had smoked R. glabra either alone or in a blend with tobacco, perhaps "for its medicinal qualities and to improve the flavor of smoke".
