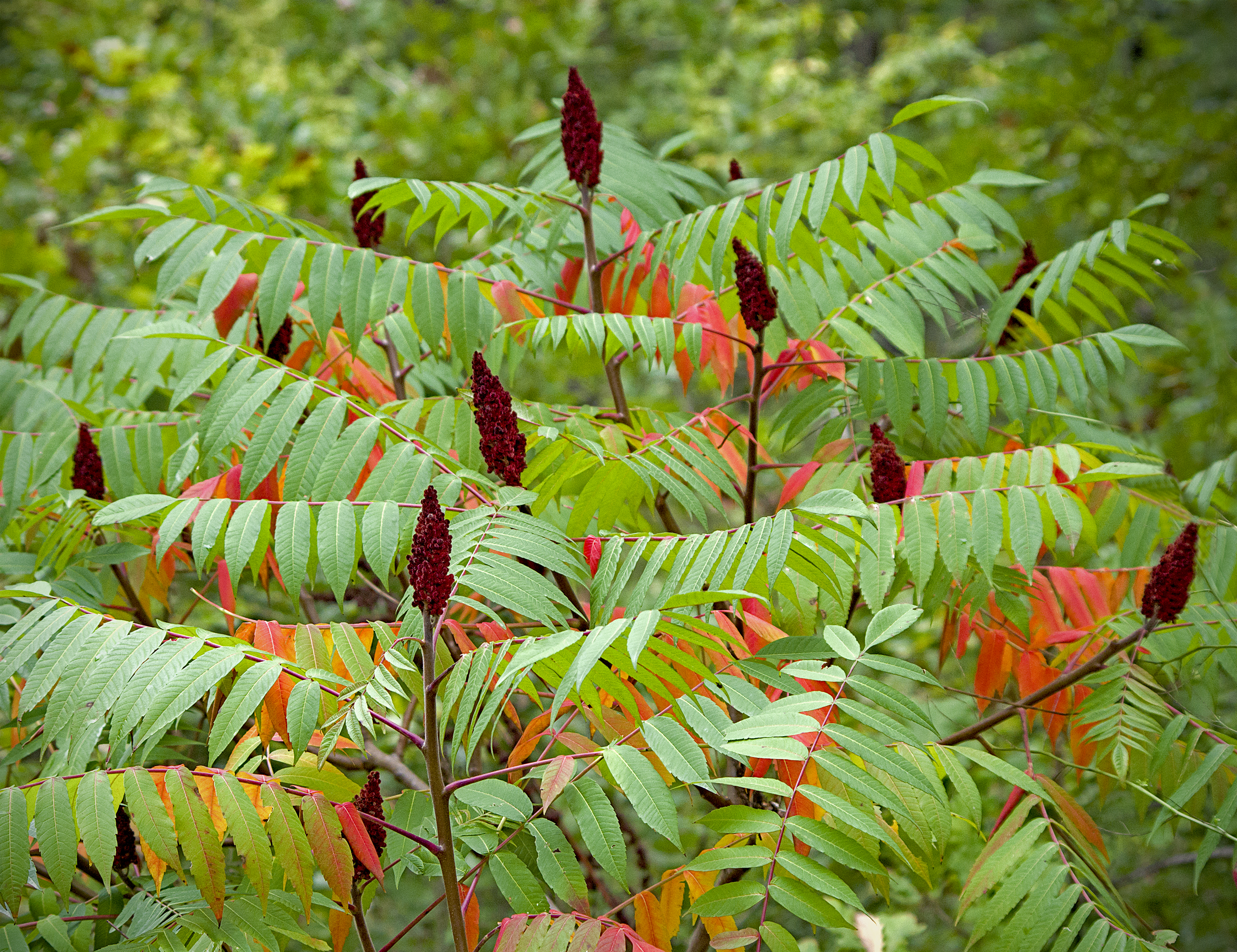

Conservation status
- Least Concern (IUCN 3.1)

- Secure (NatureServe)

Scientific classification
- Kingdom: Plantae
- Clade: Tracheophytes
- Clade: Angiosperms
- Clade: Eudicots
- Clade: Rosids
- Order: Sapindales
- Family: Anacardiaceae
- Genus: Rhus
- Species: R. typhina

Binomial name
- Rhus typhina L., 1756
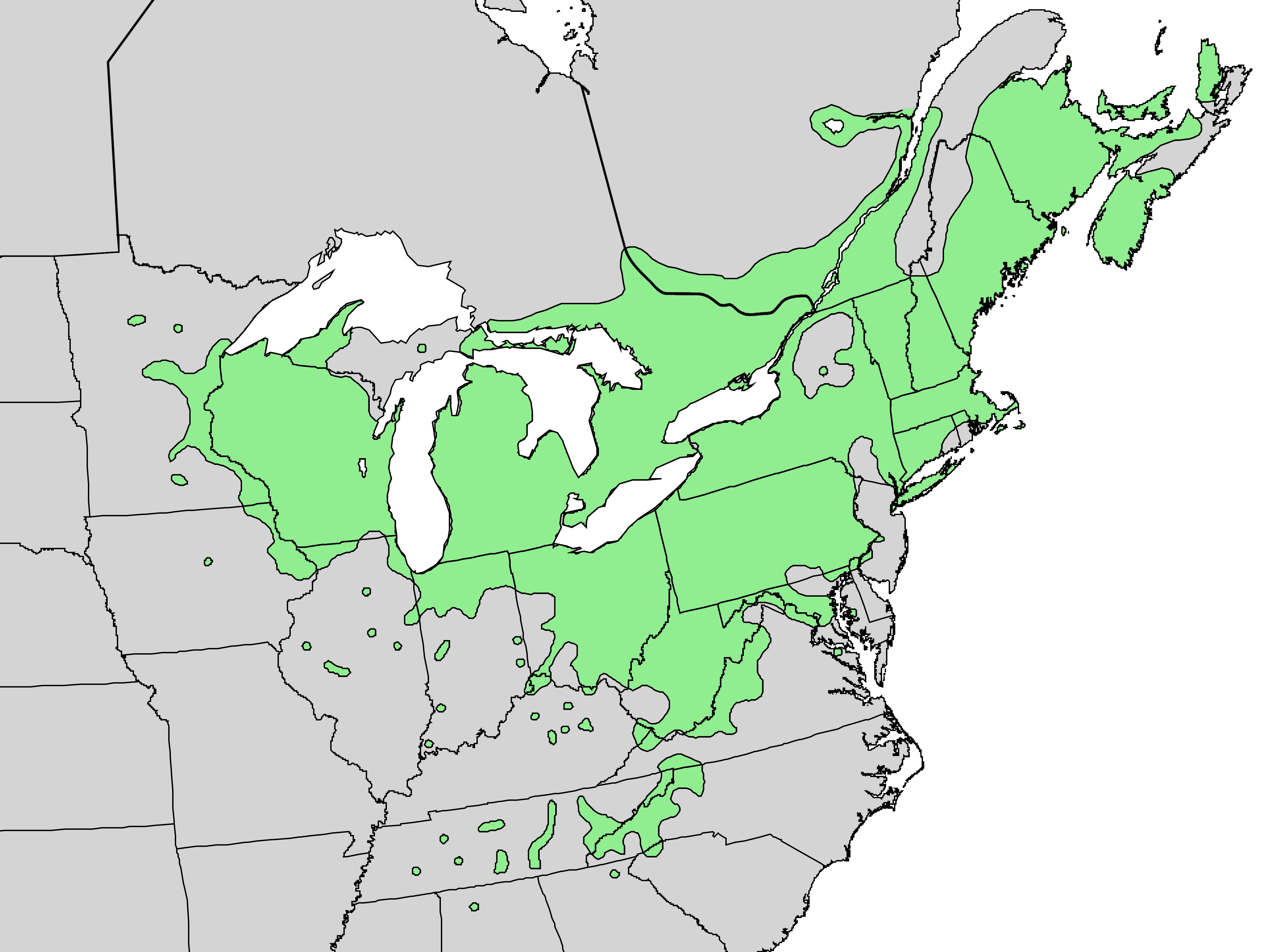

Synonyms
- 27 Synonyms: Datisca hirta L.; Rhus americana Dippel; Rhus canadensis Mill.; Rhus filicifolia Demcker; Rhus frutescens G.Nicholson; Rhus gracilis Engl.; Rhus hirta (L.) Sudw.; Rhus hirta f. dissecta (Rehder) Reveal; Rhus hirta f. typhina (L.) Reveal; Rhus hirta var. dissecta (Rehder) Nash; Rhus hirta var. laciniata C.K.Schneid.; Rhus hirta var. typhina (L.) Farw.; Rhus hypselodendrum Moench; Rhus typhia Crantz; Rhus typhina var. arborescens Willd.; Rhus typhina f. dissecta Rehder; Rhus typhina var. filicifolia Demcker; Rhus typhina var. filicina Sprenger; Rhus typhina var. frutescens Willd.; Rhus typhina var. laciniata Alph.Wood; Rhus typhina f. laciniata (Alph.Wood) Rehder; Rhus typhina var. viridiflora Engl.; Rhus virginiana Garsault; Rhus viridiflora Duhamel; Rhus viridiflora var. canadensis (Mill.) Poir.; Schmaltzia hirta (L.) Small; Toxicodendron typhinum (L.) Kuntze

= Rhus typhina =

Species of flowering plant

Rhus typhina, commonly known as the staghorn sumac or velvet sumac, is a species of flowering plant in the family Anacardiaceae. It is native to eastern North America and widely cultivated as an ornamental throughout the temperate world.

== Description ==
Rhus typhina is a dioecious and deciduous shrub or small tree growing up to 5 m (16 ft) tall by 6 m (20 ft) broad. The shoots and twigs are densely covered in a velvet of rust-colored hairs. The leaves are alternate, pinnately compound, and 25–60 cm (10–24 in) long, each with 9–31 serrate leaflets that are 6–11 cm (2 1/4–4 1/4 in) long. The leaves turn brilliant orange-red in autumn.

Blooming from May to June, small, greenish-white through yellowish flowers occur in dense terminal panicles up to 20 cm (8 in) long. Small, green then reddish drupes occur in panicles that are 15–20 cm (6–8 in) long and 5–7 1/2 cm (2–3 in) broad; these ripen through summer, maturing around October and remaining on the plant through winter.

Staghorn sumac spreads by seeds and rhizomes and forms female or male clones, often with the older shoots in the center and younger shoots around central older ones. Large clones can grow from ortets in several years.

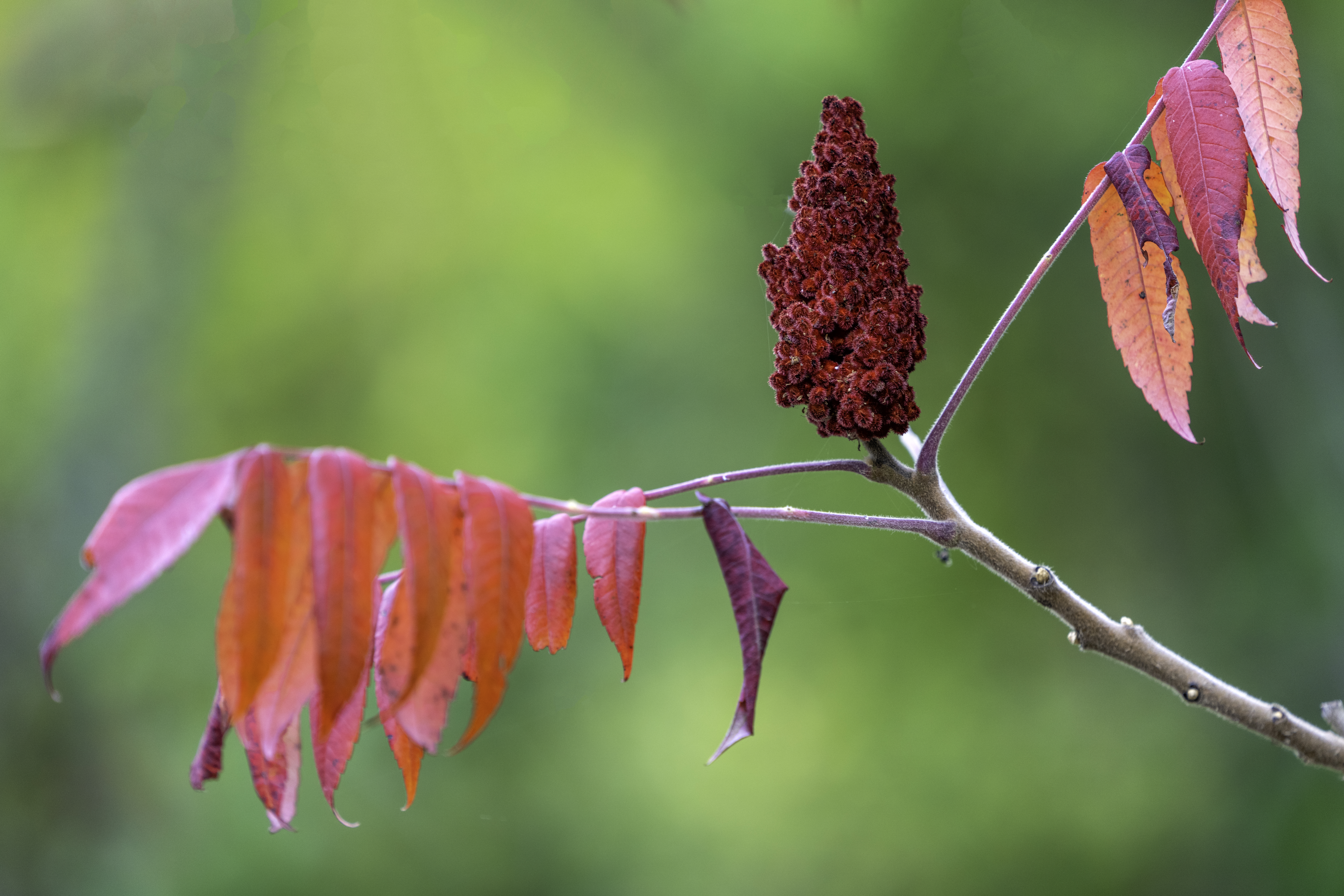
Foliage in autumn

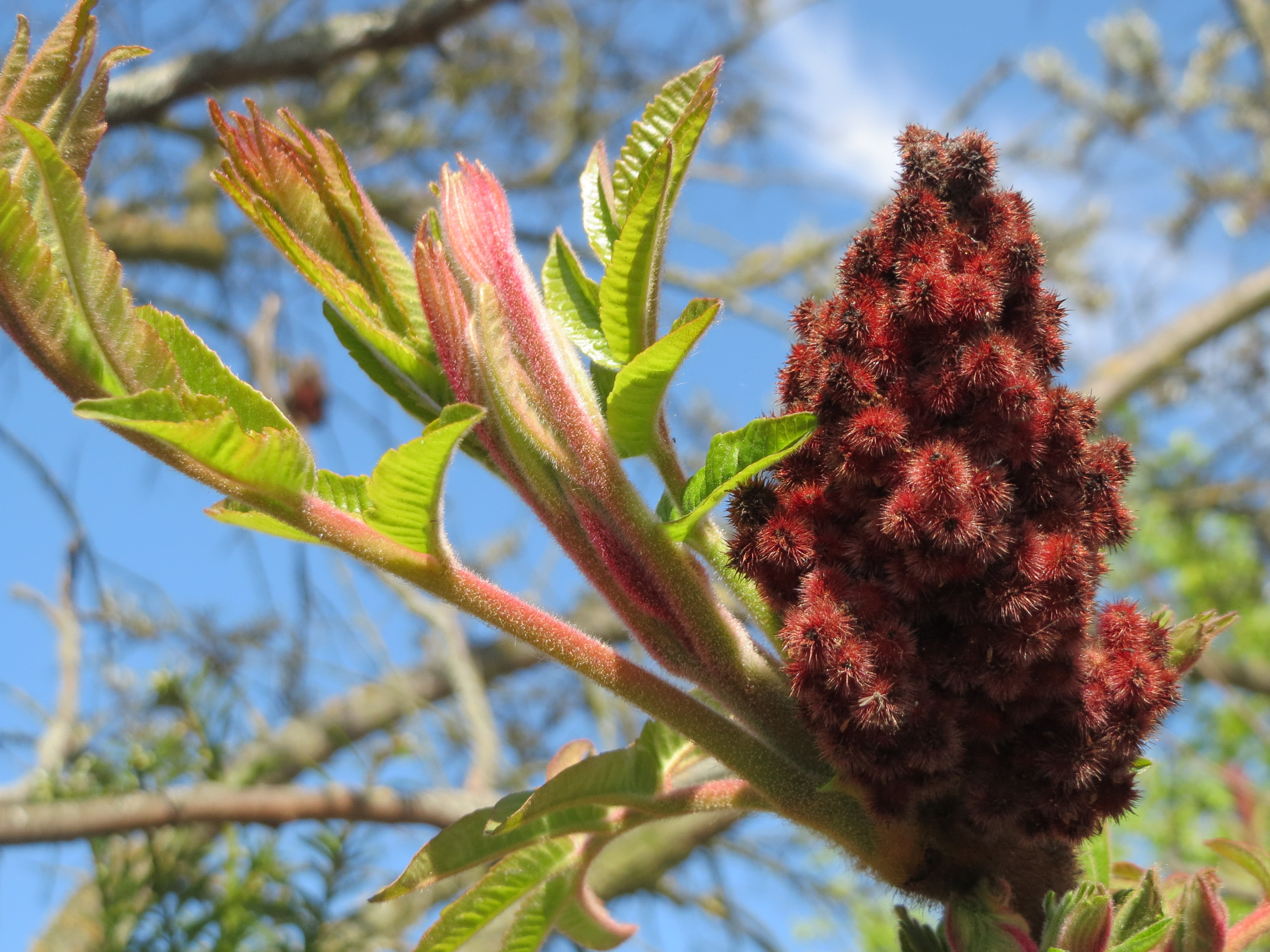
Fruit in spring

=== Similar species ===
The range of the species overlaps with that of Toxicodendron vernix (poison sumac), though despite its name this is a relative of poison ivy and is not related to sumacs and is easily visually distinguishable.

== Etymology ==
The Latin specific epithet typhina is explained in Carl Linnaeus and Ericus Torner's description of the plant with the phrase "Ramis hirtis uti typhi cervini", meaning "the branches are hairy like antlers in velvet".

The texture of the shoots (and possibly the branching of the leafless branches) are reminiscent of antlers, leading to the common name "staghorn sumac" or "stag's horn sumac".

== Distribution and habitat ==
It is primarily found in southeastern Canada, the northeastern and midwestern United States, and the Appalachian Mountains.

== Ecology ==
In late summer, some shoots have galls on leaf undersides, caused by the sumac leaf gall aphid, Melaphis rhois. The galls are not markedly harmful to the tree.

The fruits are eaten by many birds in winter and sumac foliage provides browse for various mammals.

The species easily escapes cultivation and is an invasive species in some parts of the world.

== Cultivation ==
Staghorn sumac is an ornamental plant which provides interest throughout the year; though its vigorous suckering habit makes it unsuitable for smaller gardens. It can grow under a wide array of conditions, but is most often found in dry and poor soil on which other plants cannot survive. Some landscapers remove all but the top branches to create a "crown" effect in order to resemble a small palm tree. Numerous cultivars have been developed for garden use, of which the following have gained the Royal Horticultural Society's Award of Garden Merit:

- Rhus typhina 'Dissecta' (cutleaf staghorn sumac)
- Rhus typhina Radiance = 'Sinrus'

== Uses ==
The fruits of sumacs are edible. They can be soaked and washed in cold water, strained, sweetened and made into a lemonade-like drink called sumac-ade. The drink extract can also be used to make jelly. The shoots can be peeled and eaten raw. The fruit has been found to have certain natural antioxidant and antimicrobial properties.

All parts of the staghorn sumac, except the roots, can be used as both a natural dye and as a mordant. The plant is rich in tannins and can be added to other dye baths to improve light fastness. The leaves may be harvested in the summer and the bark all year round.

The timber provides high chatoyance, with an average value above 20 PZC.
