= Beaver pipe =

Technique for outsmarting beavers

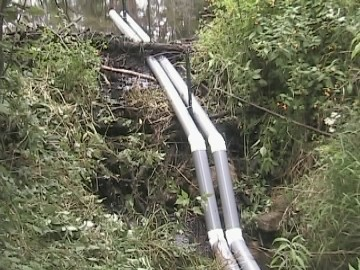
Beaver Pipes used to control water levels in Hunt Marsh, Mecosta County, Michigan. These pipes divert water downstream while allowing beavers to continue to build their dams to whatever size they choose. This photo shows beaver pipes constructed at Enzo Creek Nature Sanctuary, a private nature sanctuary near Big Rapids, Michigan.

Beaver pipes are a non-destructive flow devices, a way of controlling beaver activity in an ecosystem. The process of building beaver pipes is quite simple, and often serves as a permanent way to prevent beavers from damming water.

== Enzo Creek Nature Sanctuary ==
Managers of the watershed of the Enzo Creek Nature Sanctuary experienced the all too common problem with beavers: their tenacious desire to dam water. The water level at Enzo Creek Nature Sanctuary had been growing year after year, impacting the fauna in Hunt Marsh, an 18-acre (73,000 m^{2}) wetland which serves as both a waterfowl nesting area and refuge. Managers physically removed the dams from Enzo Creek, the only outlet to the watershed; however, beavers would quickly work to rebuild them. Lethal removal of beavers from the marsh was contrary to the mission of the sanctuary, so the non-lethal method of beaver pipes was approved and adopted.

== Overview ==
The construction of these beaver pipes at Enzo Creek Nature Sanctuary was a two-day project for one person and involved the following steps:

1. Slowly lower the water level behind the dam.
2. Insert pipes across the notch.
3. Allow beavers to complete the project.
