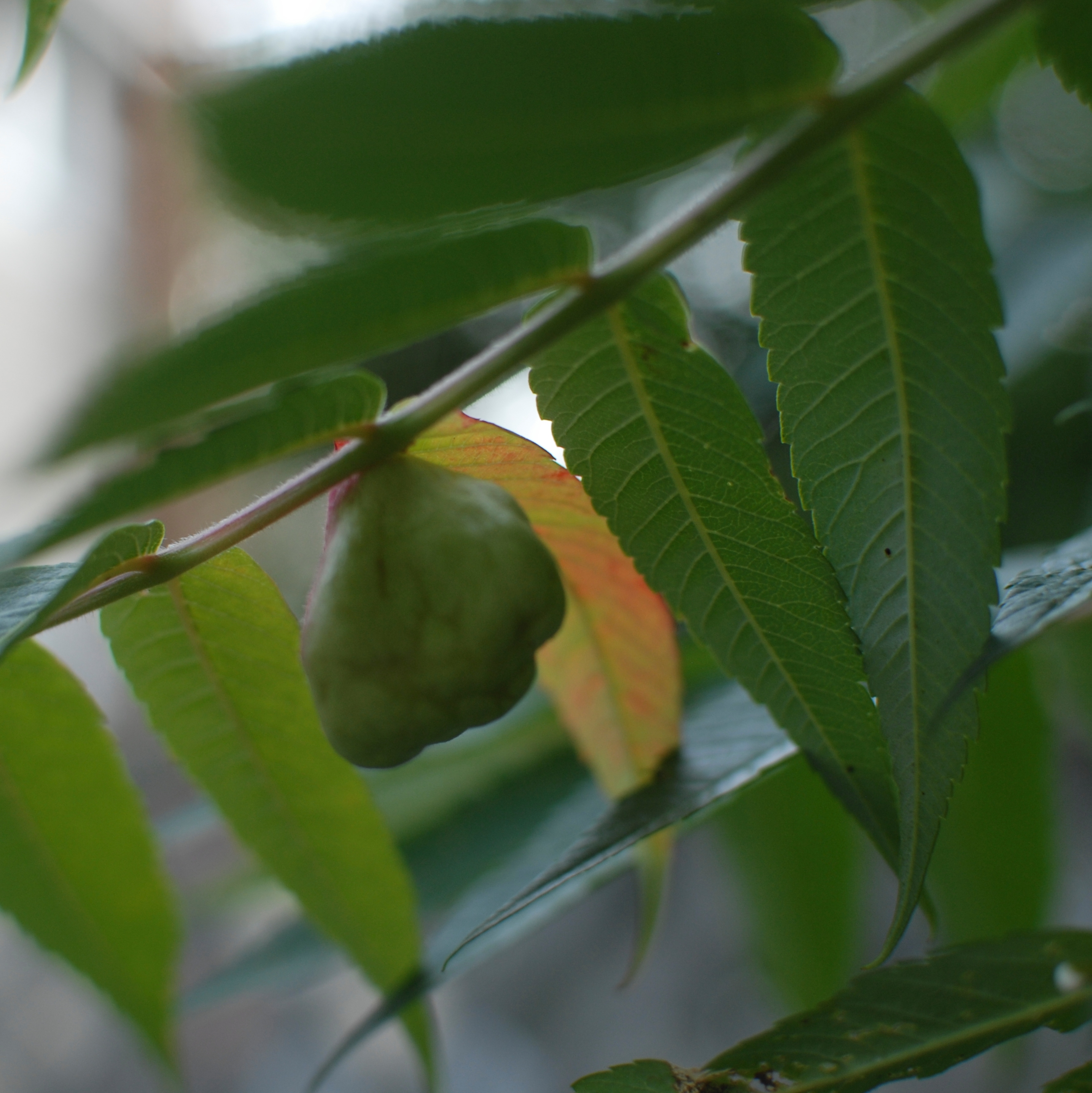
- Sumac leaf gall, feeding site of Melaphis rhois

Scientific classification
- Kingdom: Animalia
- Phylum: Arthropoda
- Clade: Pancrustacea
- Class: Insecta
- Order: Hemiptera
- Suborder: Sternorrhyncha
- Family: Aphididae
- Subfamily: Pemphiginae
- Tribe: Fordini
- Genus: Melaphis; Walsh, 1867

= Melaphis =

Genus of true bugs

Melaphis is a genus of aphids.

Species accepted as of April 2025:

- Melaphis asafitchi Foottit & Maw, 2018
- Melaphis minuta Baker, 1919
- Melaphis rhois (Fitch, 1866)
