= Tecnu =

Over-the-counter skin cleanser

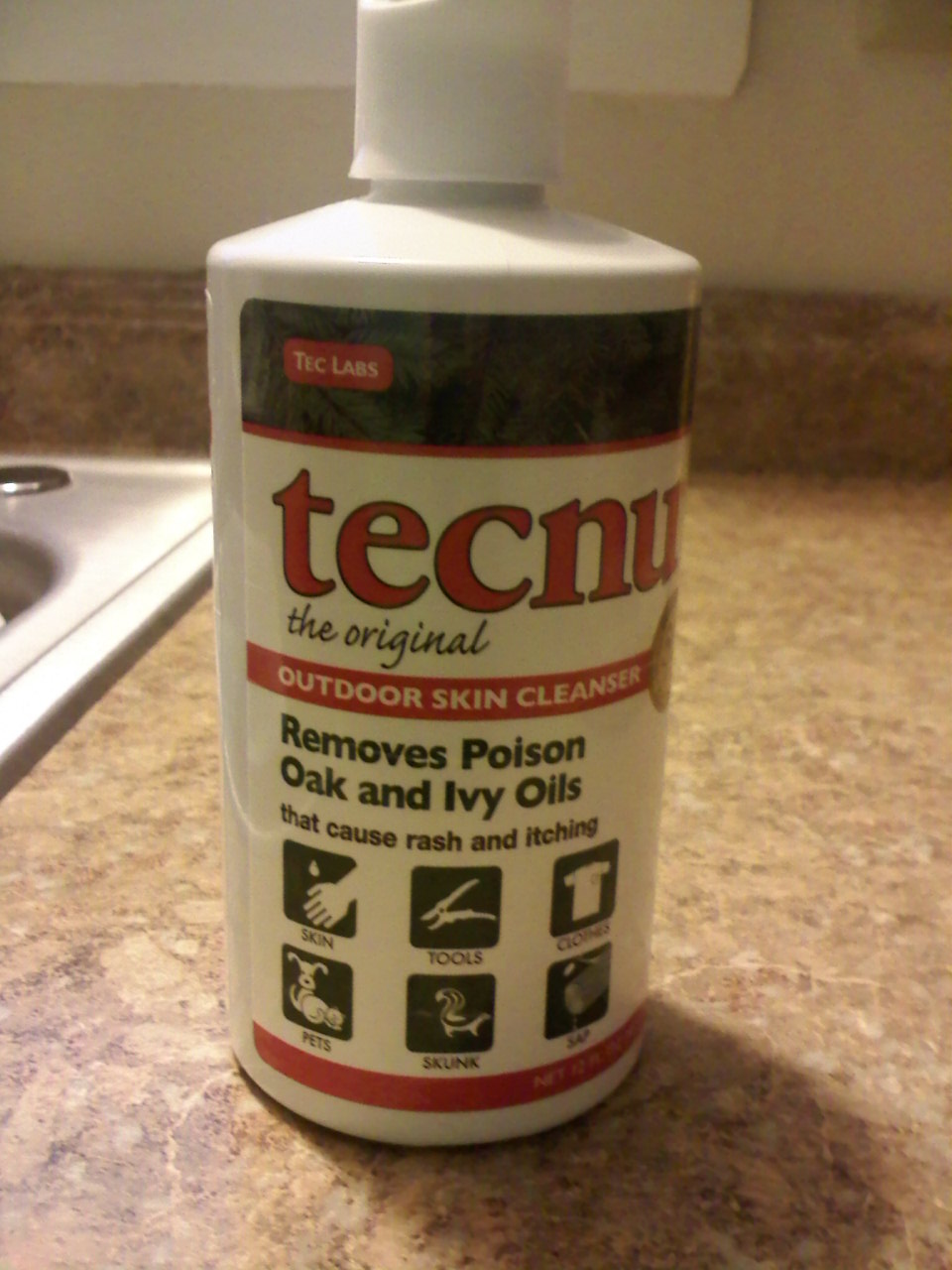
A bottle of Tecnu, a cleanser which prevents the oils which cause poison oak rash from bonding to the skin.

Tecnu is an over-the-counter skin cleanser manufactured by Tec Laboratories, a pharmaceutical company based in Albany, Oregon. It is intended for use by humans and pets after topical exposure to urushiol, the active ingredient in poison oak, poison ivy, and poison sumac. Tecnu is made from deodorized mineral spirits, water, propylene glycol, octylphenoxy-polythoxethanol, mixed fatty acid soap, and fragrance.

== History ==
The cleanser was invented by former Mead Johnson executive and chemist Robert Smith during the early 1960s. Tecnu, for "Technically New," was intended to remove radioactive fallout dust from skin. Several years later, his wife discovered another use for the cleanser. After an exposure to poison oak, she washed with Tecnu and did not get urushiol-induced contact dermatitis.

In 1977, the company began to market Tecnu to foresters, firefighters, surveyors, and utility crews. It has since become a popular remedy for gardeners and others who live and work around poison ivy.

== Effectiveness ==
Tecnu's effectiveness for postexposure treatment has been supported in a nonrandomized study, in which Tecnu and two other cleansers were compared to an untreated positive control. Tecnu provided the greatest protection against dermatitis symptoms at 70%; however, there was no statistically significant advantage in effectiveness over the other two cleansers, both of which were less expensive.
