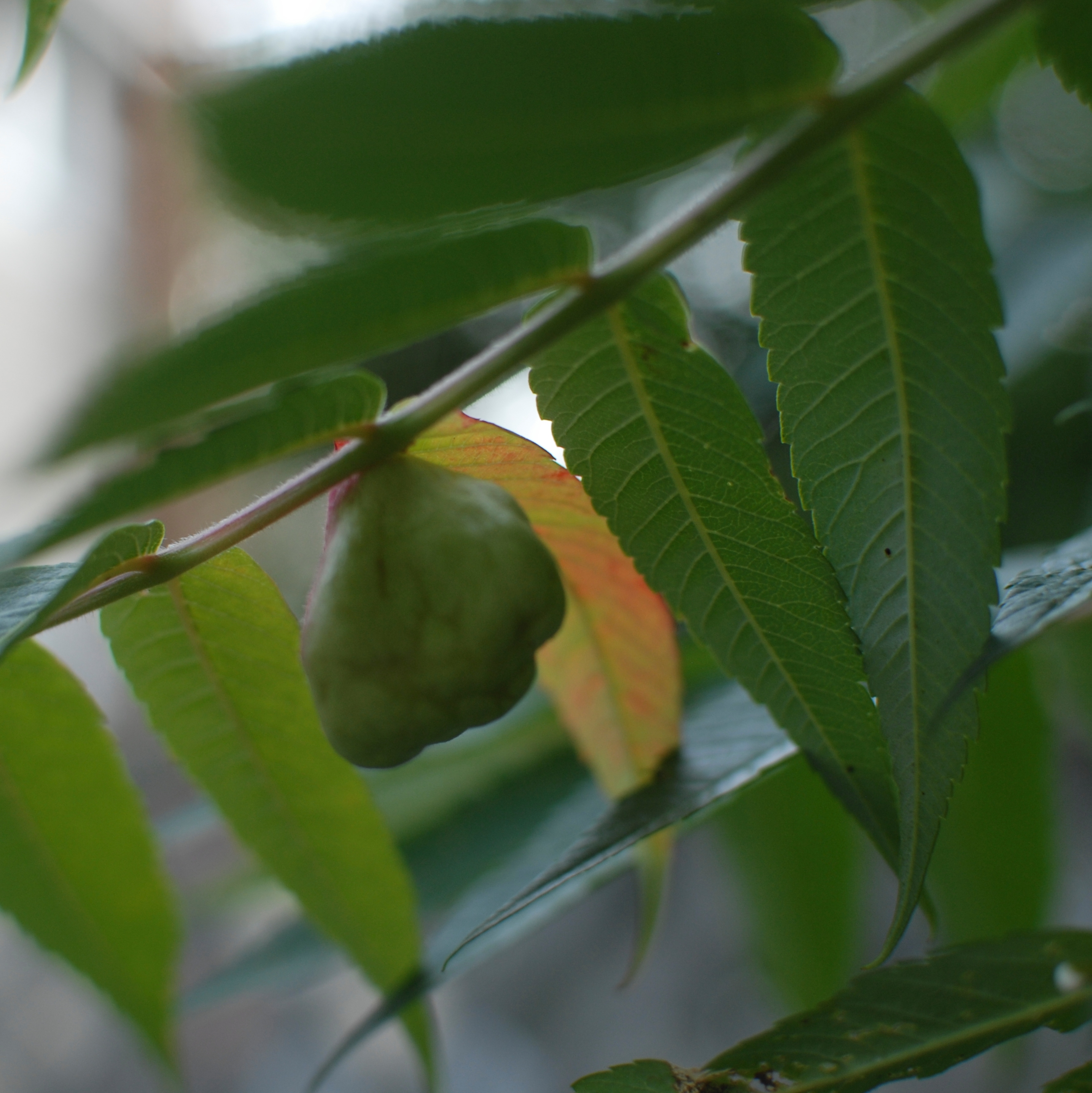
- Sumac leaf gall, feeding site of Melaphis rhois

Scientific classification
- Kingdom: Animalia
- Phylum: Arthropoda
- Clade: Pancrustacea
- Class: Insecta
- Order: Hemiptera
- Suborder: Sternorrhyncha
- Family: Aphididae
- Genus: Melaphis
- Species: M. rhois

Binomial name
- Melaphis rhois (Fitch, 1866)

= Melaphis rhois =

Species of true bug

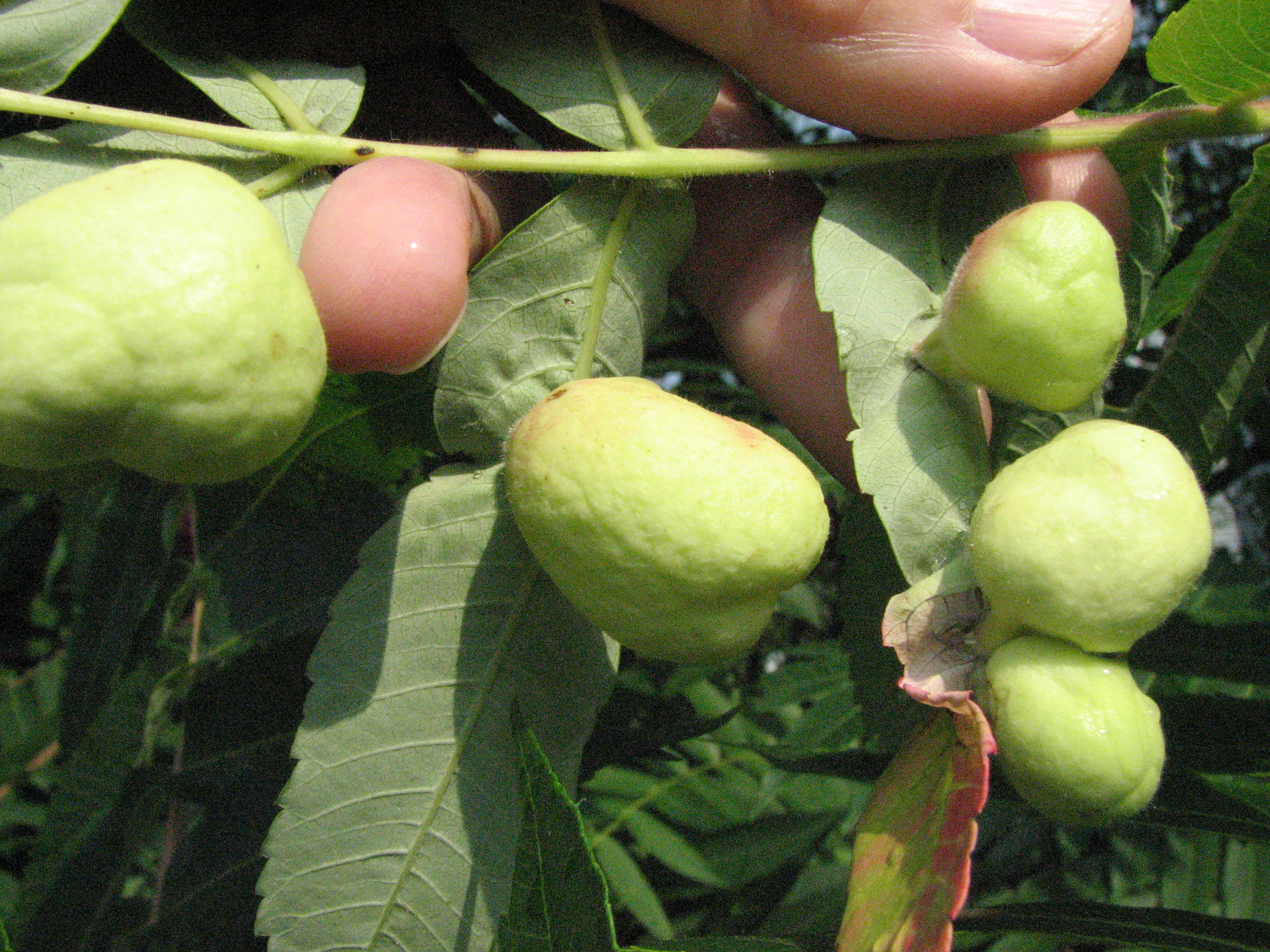
Galls

Melaphis rhois is an aphid species first identified by Asa Fitch in 1866. Known as the staghorn sumac aphid, it is in the genus Melaphis. It is a type of woolly aphid and one of the few aphids that induce the formation of galls.

== Ecology ==
The species produce galls on the staghorn sumac (Rhus typhina), an eastern North American variety of sumac, and they are also found on the smooth sumac (Rhus glabra). The gall is variously called "sumac leaf gall" and "red pouch gall" as it sometimes appears red. The galls occur when female aphids lay a single egg on the underside of the sumac leaf, inducing the leaf to form a sac over the egg. According to Hebert et al, the eggs "give rise to a series of parthenogenetic generations, which remain within the gall. Winged females leave the gall in late summer and fly to moss, where they establish asexually reproducing colonies. The colonies produce the males and sexual females responsible for recolonizing sumac each spring." In 1989, it was reported that the use of alternate plant hosts by the aphids dates from 48 million years before present. When identified, this was the oldest known documented insect-plant relationship; much older relationships have subsequently been discovered. See more at Paleoparasitology.

== Relation to plant mortality ==
Though parasitic, the aphids are considered inconsequential to the health of the host plant. Unlike the Chinese gall, sumac leaf galls have no commercial value.

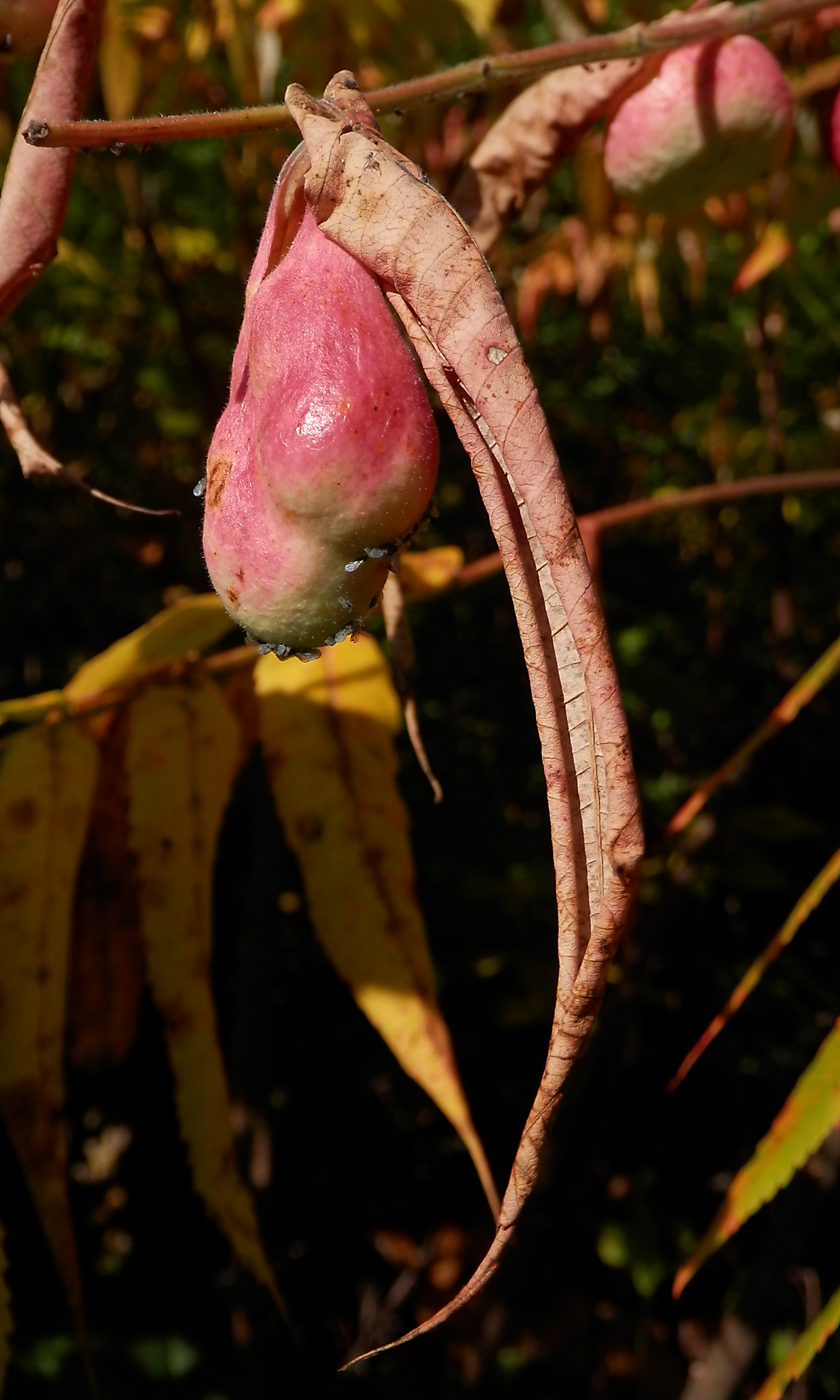
Red pouch gall
