= Townline Lake =

Lake in the state of Michigan, United States

- Location within Michigan Location within the United States
- Location: Mecosta County, Michigan, United States
- Coordinates: 43°43′13″N 85°26′31″W
- Type: Lake
- Basin countries: United States
- Surface area: 73 acres (30 ha)
- Max. depth: 50 ft (15 m)
- Surface elevation: 932 ft (284 m)

Townline Lake is a 73-acre (300,000 m^{2}) lake located in Mecosta County near the City of Big Rapids, Michigan. It is located in Colfax Township and Big Rapids Township. It has a maximum depth of 50 feet (15 m). Grass Lake (Private-approximately 6 acres (2.4 ha)) is located in the NW section of Townline Lake and has an outlet which feeds Townline Lake. The outlet from Townline feeds Enzo Creek, which ultimately feeds into Ryan Creek. Fish species include bass, bluegill, northern pike, and crappie. Loons can be seen on the lake, as well as herons in the shallow zones.

This lake is likely a glacial kettle lake, with at least two deep kettles, as indicated by the steep drop offs in depth from 3 feet down to 20-30 feet within a short distance. These lakes formed from tall large chunks of ice that melted after glacial retreat, leaving deep kettles where the ice scoured the landscape. The drop offs are great habitat for bass and pike. The lake is also home to the rarely seen freshwater jellyfish, which have been observed late in the season, including September and October.

== See also ==
- List of lakes in Michigan
