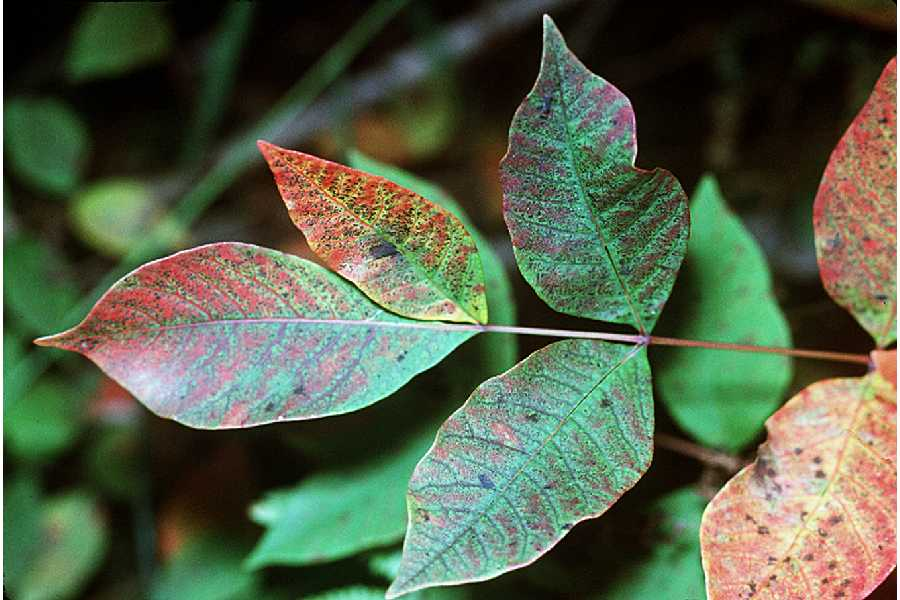
- Poison sumac leaves

Conservation status
- Least Concern (IUCN 3.1)

- Secure (NatureServe)

Scientific classification
- Kingdom: Plantae
- Clade: Embryophytes
- Clade: Tracheophytes
- Clade: Spermatophytes
- Clade: Angiosperms
- Clade: Eudicots
- Clade: Rosids
- Order: Sapindales
- Family: Anacardiaceae
- Genus: Toxicodendron
- Species: T. vernix

Binomial name
- Toxicodendron vernix (L.) Kuntze
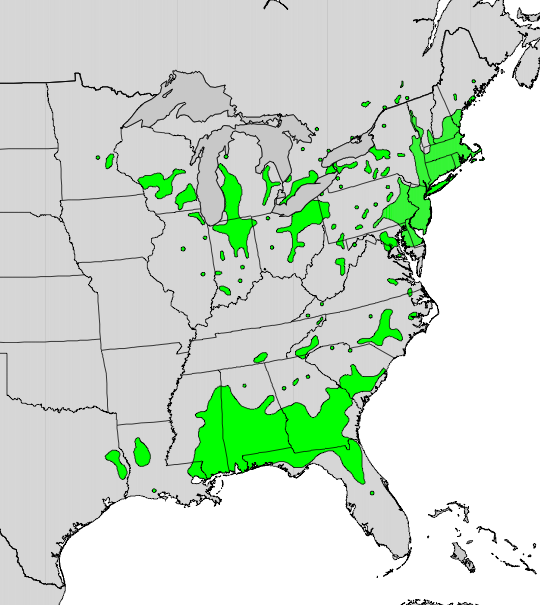

Synonyms
- List: Rhus aequalis Pers.; Rhus venenata DC.; Rhus vernix L.

= Toxicodendron vernix =

Poison sumac

Species of plant

Toxicodendron vernix, commonly known as poison sumac, or swamp-sumach, is a woody shrub or small tree growing to 9 metres (30 feet) tall. It was previously known as Rhus vernix. This plant is also known as thunderwood, particularly where it occurs in the southern United States.

Like its toxic relatives poison ivy and poison oak, all parts of the plant contain a resin called urushiol, which causes skin and mucous membrane irritation to humans. When the plant is burned, inhalation of the smoke may cause the rash to appear on the lining of the lungs, causing extreme pain and possibly fatal respiratory difficulty.

== Description ==
Poison sumac is a shrub or small tree, growing up to nearly 9 metres (30 feet) in height. Each pinnate leaf has 7–13 leaflets, each of which is 5–10 centimetres (2–4 inches) long. These are oval-to-oblong; acuminate (tapering to a sharp point); cuneate (wedge-shaped) at the base; undulate (wavy-edged); with an underside that is glabrous (hairless) or slightly pubescent (down-like hair) beneath. The stems along the leaflets are red and the leaves can have a reddish tint to them, particularly at the top of the plant. New bark for a poison sumac tree is lightish gray, and as the bark ages, it becomes darker.

Its flowers are greenish, growing in loose axillary panicles (clusters) 8–20 cm (3–8 in) long. The fruits are subglobose (not quite spherical), whitish-gray, flattened, and about 0.5 cm (1/4 in) across; these are eaten by birds.

Poison sumac fruit are creamy white and part of a cluster. Typically, they are around 4 to 5 millimetres (5/32 to 3/16 in) in size.

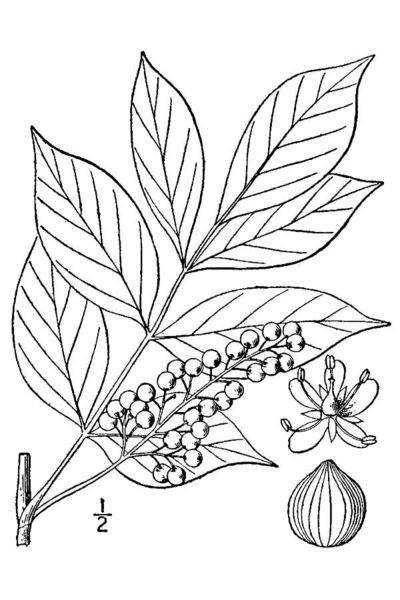
Illustration

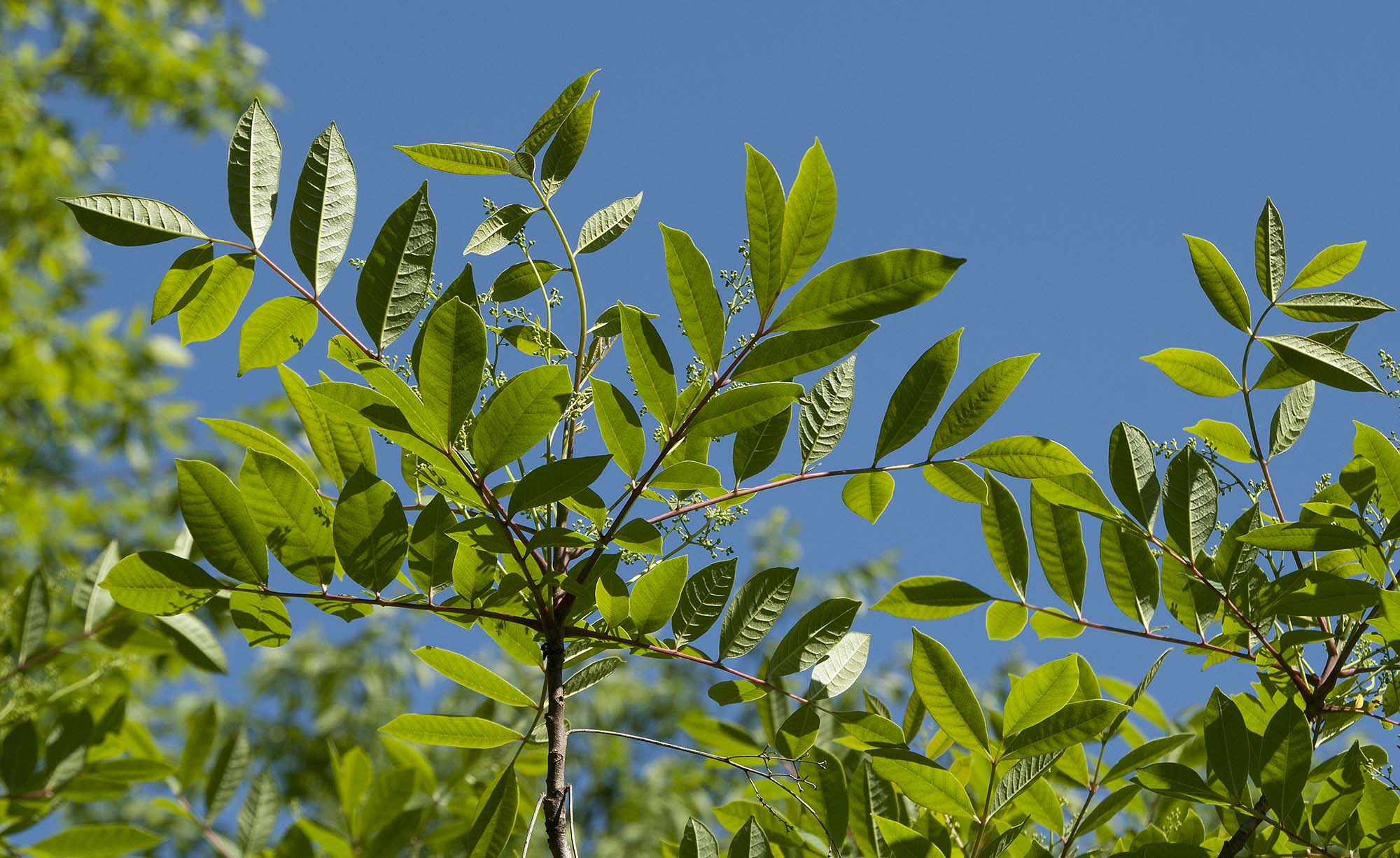
Foliage, Ozaukee County, Wisconsin

== Distribution and habitat ==
Poison sumac grows exclusively in wet and clay soils, usually in swamps and peat bogs, in the eastern United States and extreme southeast Canada.

== Ecology ==
The fruit and leaves of the poison sumac plant contain urushiol, an oil that causes an allergic rash upon contact with skin. They are, however, not toxic to birds or other animals, and eaten by them when other food is scarce, especially in winter.

== Toxicity ==
In terms of its potential to cause urushiol-induced contact dermatitis, poison sumac is more toxic than its relatives poison ivy and poison oak.

The differences in toxicity in poison ivy, poison oak, and poison sumac are due to differences in the side chains of the chemicals in these plants. In general, poison ivy has a C_{15} side chain, poison oak has a C_{17} side chain and poison sumac has a C_{13} side chain.

The dermatitis shows itself in painful and long continued swellings and eruptions. In the worst case, smoke inhaled by burning poison sumac leads to life-threatening pulmonary edema whereby fluid enters the alveoli.

== Historical account ==
In 1836, a teenage Frederick Law Olmsted, the future landscape designer of Central Park, accidentally rubbed poison sumac into his eyes. The resulting reaction affected his vision, which limited his ability to read and attend school. This interruption in his education influenced his eventual career path.

== See also ==
- Tecnu - skin cleanser
