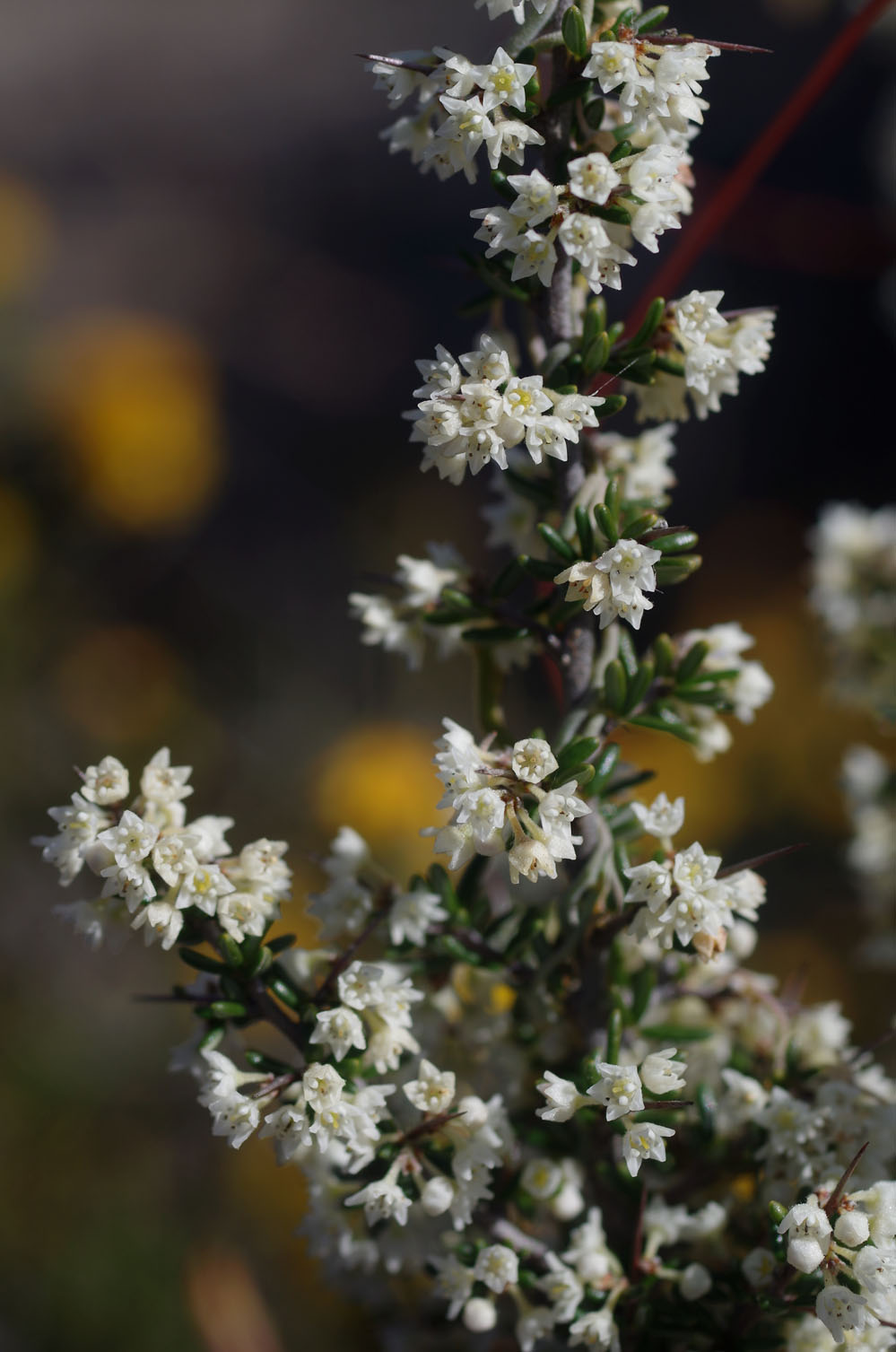
- In Wongan Hills

Scientific classification
- Kingdom: Plantae
- Clade: Tracheophytes
- Clade: Angiosperms
- Clade: Eudicots
- Clade: Rosids
- Order: Rosales
- Family: Rhamnaceae
- Genus: Cryptandra
- Species: C. pungens

Binomial name
- Cryptandra pungens Steud.

= Cryptandra pungens =

Species of flowering plant

Cryptandra pungens is a species of flowering plant in the family Rhamnaceae and is endemic to the southwest of Western Australia. It is an erect, slender, spiny shrub that typically grows to a height of 0.2–1 m (7.9 in – 3 ft 3.4 in) with many short branches ending with thin spines. Its leaves mostly in bundles and are 4–6 mm (0.16–0.24 in) long. The flowers are white, each on a pedicel 1–2 mm (0.039–0.079 in) long with minute, overlapping brown bracts at the base. The sepals are about 1.6 mm (0.063 in) long and joined at the base to form a broadly bell-shaped tube, with lobes half as long as the tube. Flowering occurs from May to November. The species was first formally described in 1845 by Ernst Gottlieb von Steudel in Lehmann's Plantae Preissianae from specimens collected in sandy forest near Perth. The specific epithet (pungens) means "ending in a sharp, hard point".

Cryptandra pungens grows on coastal limestone, granite outcrops, sandplains and hills in the Avon Wheatbelt, Coolgardie, Esperance Plains, Geraldton Sandplains, Jarrah Forest, Mallee and Swan Coastal Plain bioregions of south-western Western Australia. It is listed as "not threatened" by the Western Australian Government Department of Biodiversity, Conservation and Attractions.
