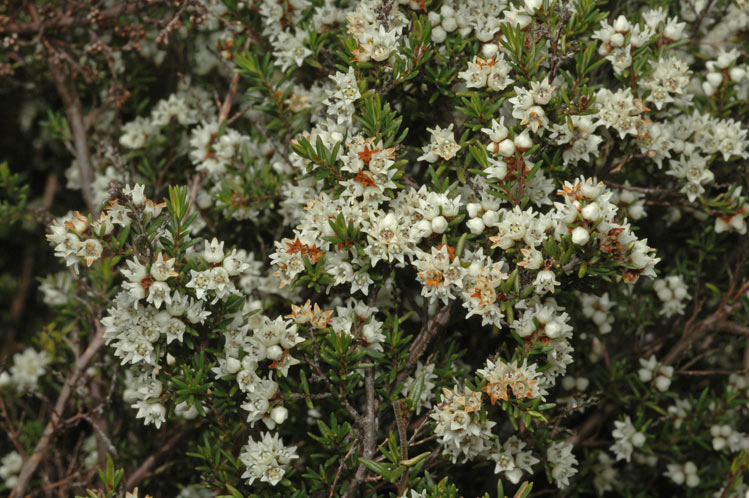

Scientific classification
- Kingdom: Plantae
- Clade: Tracheophytes
- Clade: Angiosperms
- Clade: Eudicots
- Clade: Rosids
- Order: Rosales
- Family: Rhamnaceae
- Genus: Cryptandra
- Species: C. tomentosa

Binomial name
- Cryptandra tomentosa Lindl.

Synonyms
- Cryptandra behriana Reissek; Cryptandra divaricata Reissek; Cryptandra erubescens .Muell. ex Reissek; Cryptandra tomentosa var. 1; Cryptandra tomentosa Lindl. var. tomentosa

= Cryptandra tomentosa =

Species of plant

Cryptandra tomentosa, commonly known as prickly cryptandra, is a species of flowering plant in the family Rhamnaceae and is endemic to the southern continental Australia. It is a small, straggling, erect to low-lying shrub sometimes with spiny branches, and has cylindrical leaves and loose clusters of white, bell-shaped flowers that turn pink to red as they age.

== Description ==
Cryptandra tomentosa is a small, straggling, erect to low-lying shrub that typically grows to a height of 25–30 cm (9.8–11.8 in), its branchlets sometimes ending in a spine. The leaves are cylindrical, mostly 2–5 mm (0.079–0.197 in) long and about 0.5 mm (0.020 in) wide, on a short petiole 0.6–0.8 mm (0.024–0.031 in) long with stipules up to 1.5 mm (0.059 in) long at the base. The edges of the leaves are rolled under, usually concealing most of the lower surface. The flowers are borne in sessile, spike-like clusters of a few flowers with broadly egg-shaped bracts up to 1 mm (0.039 in) long at the base. The floral tube is broadly bell-shaped, 1.5–2.5 mm (0.059–0.098 in) long and white, ageing to pink or red, the sepals about the same length as the floral tube, and the petals about 0.5 mm (0.020 in) long. Flowering occurs from May to October.

== Taxonomy ==
Cryptandra tomentosa was formally described in 1838 by botanist John Lindley in Thomas Livingstone Mitchell's Three Expeditions into the interior of Eastern Australia. The specific epithet (tomentosa ) means "tomentose".

== Distribution and habitat ==
Prickly cryptandra grows in heath and woodland west of Port Phillip Bay in Victoria and in south-eastern South Australia, including on Kangaroo Island.
