= Cryptandra exserta =

Conservation status
- Priority One — Poorly Known Taxa (DEC)

Scientific classification
- Kingdom: Plantae
- Clade: Tracheophytes
- Clade: Angiosperms
- Clade: Eudicots
- Clade: Rosids
- Order: Rosales
- Family: Rhamnaceae
- Genus: Cryptandra
- Species: C. exserta

Binomial name
- Cryptandra exserta Rye

Species of flowering plant

Cryptandra exserta is a flowering plant in the family Rhamnaceae and is endemic to inland Western Australia. It is a shrub with narrowly oblong leaves and clusters of white, tube-shaped flowers.

== Description ==
Cryptandra exserta is a shrub that typically grows to a height of up to about 50 cm (20 in), its young stems densely covered with matted hairs. The leaves are narrowly oblong, 2.3–2.5 mm (0.091–0.098 in) long and 0.5–0.7 mm (0.020–0.028 in) wide, on a petiole about 0.3 mm (0.012 in) long with stipules 0.6–1.0 mm (0.024–0.039 in) long at the base. The edges of the leaves are turned down or rolled under, sometimes concealing the hairy white lower surface. The flowers are borne in spike-like clusters of 2 to 5, sometimes up to 10, on the ends of branchlets. The flowers are surrounded by about 10 broadly egg-shaped to oblong bracts. The floral tube is about 2.5 mm (0.098 in) long, the sepals 2.0–2.5 mm (0.079–0.098 in) long and densely hairy. Flowering occurs from July to September.

== Taxonomy and naming ==
Cryptandra exserta was first formally described in 2007 by Barbara Lynette Rye in the journal Nuytsia from specimens collected north of Norseman in 2001. The specific epithet (exserta ) means "protruding", referring to the flowers' protruding from the bracts.

== Distribution and habitat ==
This cryptandra mainly grows on plains in the Coolgardie and Mallee bioregions of inland Western Australia.

== Conservation status ==
This cryptandra is listed as "Threatened" by the Western Australian Government Department of Biodiversity, Conservation and Attractions, meaning that it is in danger of extinction.
