= Cryptandra multispina =

Scientific classification
- Kingdom: Plantae
- Clade: Tracheophytes
- Clade: Angiosperms
- Clade: Eudicots
- Clade: Rosids
- Order: Rosales
- Family: Rhamnaceae
- Genus: Cryptandra
- Species: C. multispina

Binomial name
- Cryptandra multispina Rye

Species of flowering plant

Cryptandra multispina is a species of flowering plant in the family Rhamnaceae and is endemic to the southwest of Western Australia. It is an erect, compact, spiny shrub that typically grows to a height of 10–70 cm (3.9–27.6 in).

== Taxonomy and naming ==
This species was first formally described in 1863 by George Bentham, who gave it the name Cryptandra scoparia var. microcephala in Flora Australiensis from specimens collected by Augustus Oldfield near the Murchison River. In 2007, Barbara Rye raised the variety to species status as C. multispina, since the name Cryptandra microcephala had already been used for a species now known as Spyridium microcephalum. The specific epithet (multispina ) means "many spines".

== Distribution ==
This cryptandra grows in sand or clayey sand over sandstone and limestone on ridges and plains, flats, hills and road verges in the Avon Wheatbelt, Geraldton Sandplains and Mallee bioregions of south-western Western Australia.

== Conservation status ==
Cryptandra multispina is listed as "not threatened" by the Western Australian Government Department of Biodiversity, Conservation and Attractions.
