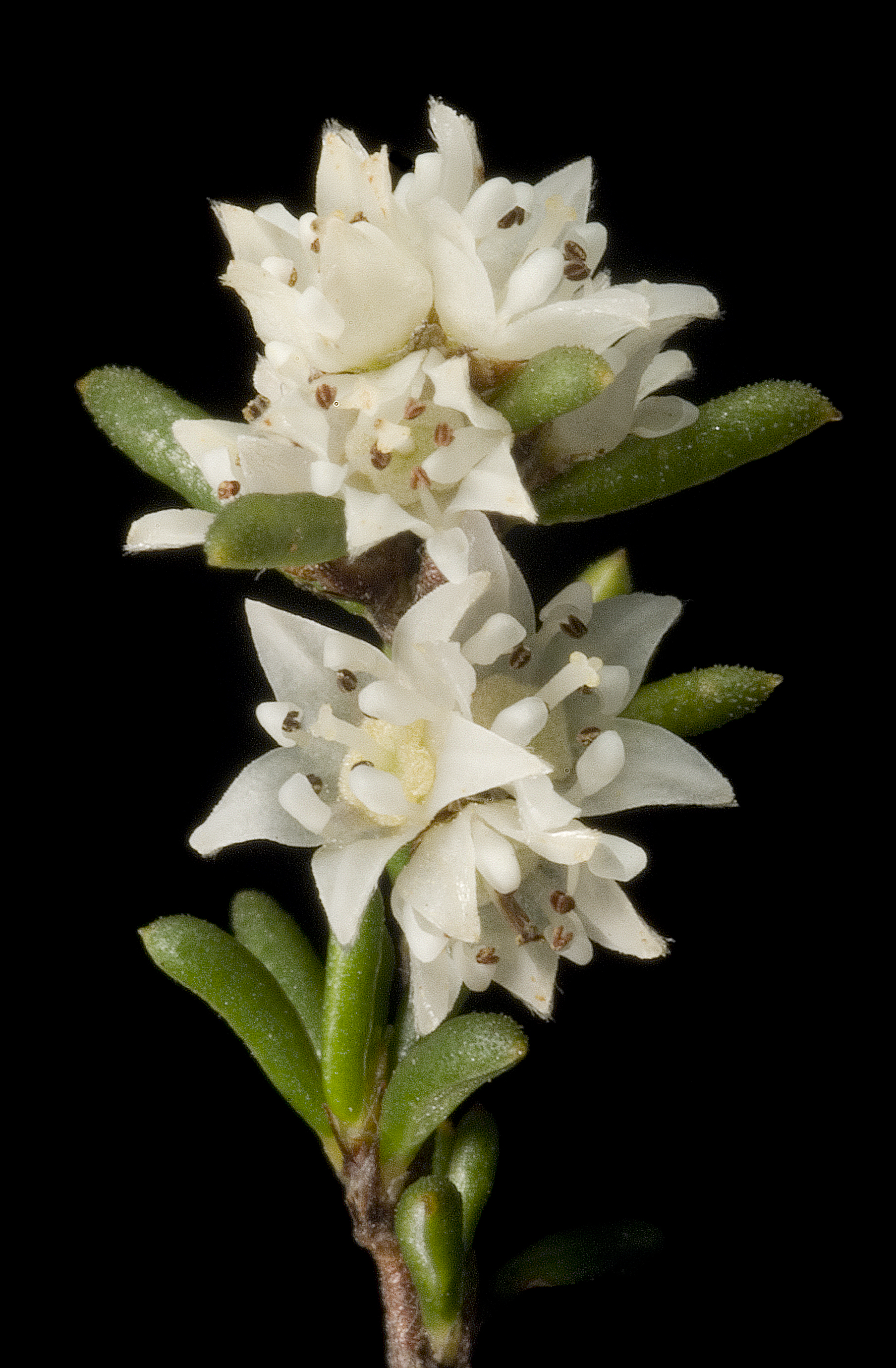

Scientific classification
- Kingdom: Plantae
- Clade: Tracheophytes
- Clade: Angiosperms
- Clade: Eudicots
- Clade: Rosids
- Order: Rosales
- Family: Rhamnaceae
- Genus: Cryptandra
- Species: C. myriantha

Binomial name
- Cryptandra myriantha Diels

= Cryptandra myriantha =

Species of flowering plant

Cryptandra myriantha is a flowering plant in the family Rhamnaceae and is endemic to southern continental Australia. It is a slender, erect or straggling shrub with cylindrical leaves and more or less sessile clusters of creamy-white to pink flowers.

== Description ==
Cryptandra myriantha is a slender, erect or straggling shrub that typically grows to a height of 10–60 cm (3.9–23.6 in) and has branchlets lacking spines. The leaves are mostly cylindrical, mostly 2–5 mm (0.079–0.197 in) long and 0.5–1 mm (0.020–0.039 in) in diameter on a short petiole with egg-shaped stipules up to 1.7 mm (0.067 in) long at the base. The upper surface of the leaves is glabrous and the lower surface is covered with minute pimples. The flowers are creamy-white to pink and arranged singly or in a raceme of up to 10 on a short pedicel with brown, egg-shaped bracts 1.0–2.2 mm (0.039–0.087 in) long at the base. The floral tube is bell-shaped, 1.5–2.5 mm (0.059–0.098 in) long and white, the sepals 1–2 mm (0.039–0.079 in) long and softly-hairy, the petals 0.7–1 mm (0.028–0.039 in) long. Flowering occurs from May to September.

== Taxonomy and naming ==
Cryptandra myriantha was first formally described in 1904 by Ludwig Diels in Botanische Jahrbücher für Systematik, Pflanzengeschichte und Pflanzengeographie from specimens collected near Moora. The specific epithet (myriantha) means "countless-flowered".

== Distribution ==
This cryptandra grows in sandy and gravelly soils in the Avon Wheatbelt, Coolgardie, Esperance Plains, Geraldton Sandplains, Jarrah Forest, Mallee and Swan Coastal Plain bioregions of south-west of Western Australia, and in the south-east of South Australia. In Victoria it is only known from a single collection in the Little Desert region in 1979.

== Conservation status ==
Cryptandra myriantha is listed as "not threatened" by the Western Australian Government Department of Biodiversity, Conservation and Attractions, but as "critically endangered" in Victoria under the Flora and Fauna Guarantee Act 1988.
