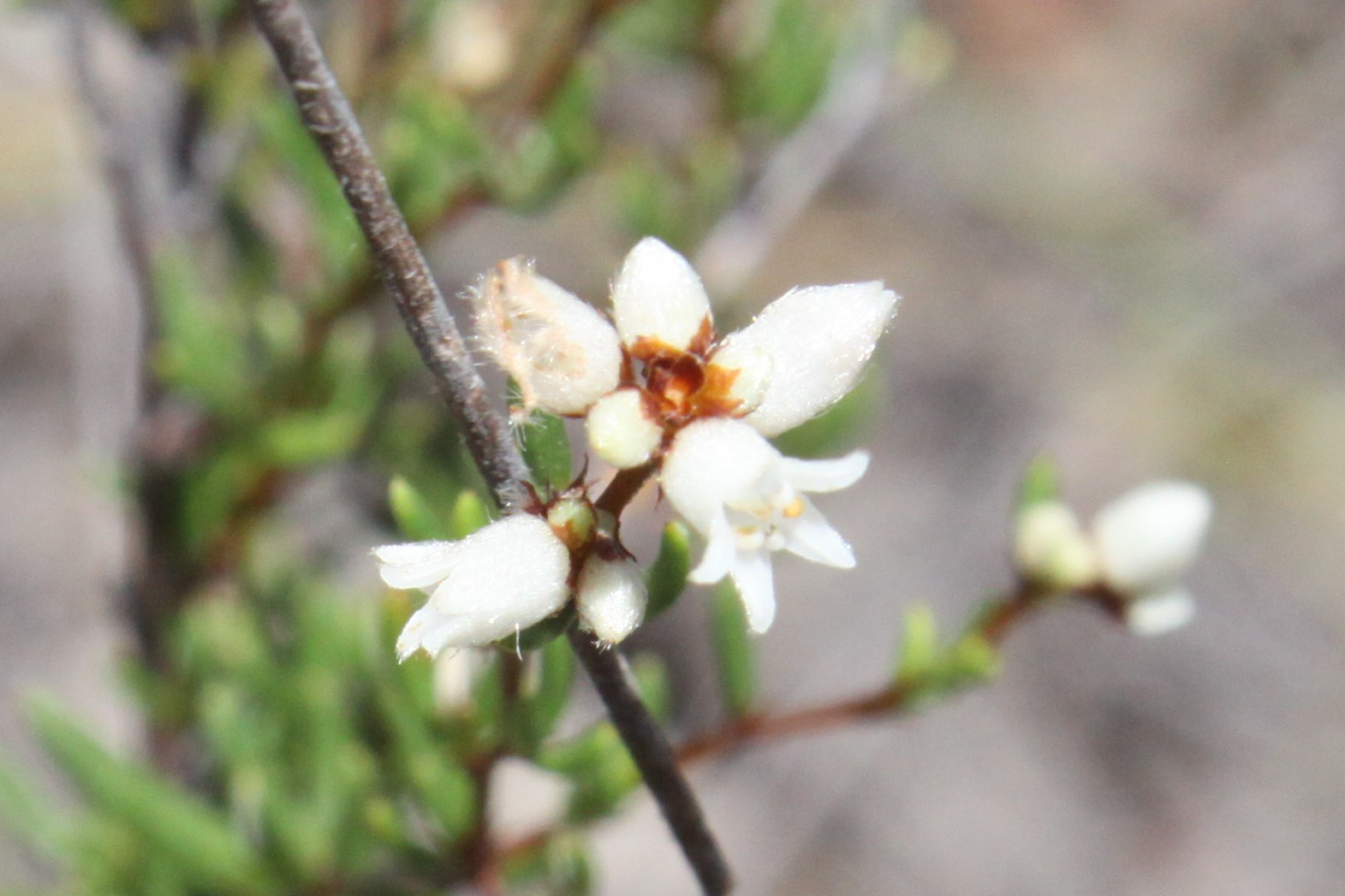
- Near Irvinebank

Scientific classification
- Kingdom: Plantae
- Clade: Tracheophytes
- Clade: Angiosperms
- Clade: Eudicots
- Clade: Rosids
- Order: Rosales
- Family: Rhamnaceae
- Genus: Cryptandra
- Species: C. debilis

Binomial name
- Cryptandra debilis A.R.Bean

= Cryptandra debilis =

Species of flowering plant

Cryptandra debilis is a species of flowering plant in the family Rhamnaceae and is endemic to north Queensland. It is a small shrub with clustered, linear leaves and densely-hairy, white, tube-shaped flowers.

== Description ==
Cryptandra debilis is a shrub that typically grows to a height of up to 30 cm (12 in), its branchlets hairy at first. Its leaves are arranged in clusters of up to 8, linear and clustered, mostly 2.5–6.5 mm (0.098–0.256 in) long and 0.5–0.7 mm (0.020–0.028 in) wide on a petiole 0.3–0.5 mm (0.012–0.020 in) long, with stipules 1.3–1.6 mm (0.051–0.063 in) long at the base. The upper surface of the leaves is glabrous and the edges are rolled under, obscuring the lower surface. The flowers are white and borne singly in leaf axils in groups of up to four with 3 to 6 bracts at the base. The floral tube is 1.2–1.5 mm (0.047–0.059 in) long, the sepal lobes 1.0–1.2 mm (0.039–0.047 in) long and densely hairy. The petals are 0.4–0.5 mm (0.016–0.020 in) long, forming a hood over the stamens and protruding beyond the sepal tube. Flowering mostly occurs from April to July, and the fruit is about 2.6 mm (0.10 in) long.

== Taxonomy and naming ==
Cryptandra debilis was first formally described in 2004 by Anthony Bean in the journal Austrobaileya from specimens collected near Watsonville in 1997. The specific epithet (debilis) means "weak" or "feeble", referring to the stature of the plant.

== Distribution and habitat ==
This cryptandra grows in shrubland on sandstone and granite ridges on parts of the Atherton Tableland and nearby Mount Mulligan in far north Queensland.
