= Cryptandra intonsa =

Scientific classification
- Kingdom: Plantae
- Clade: Tracheophytes
- Clade: Angiosperms
- Clade: Eudicots
- Clade: Rosids
- Order: Rosales
- Family: Rhamnaceae
- Genus: Cryptandra
- Species: C. intonsa

Binomial name
- Cryptandra intonsa Rye

Species of flowering plant

Cryptandra intonsa is a flowering plant in the family Rhamnaceae and is endemic to inland Western Australia. It is an erect or spreading shrub with linear to narrowly oblong leaves and white or cream-coloured, tube-shaped flowers arranged in head-like clusters.

== Description ==
Cryptandra intonsa is a shrub that typically grows to a height of 30–60 cm (12–24 in), its branchlets not spiny, its young stems densely covered with star-shaped hairs. The leaves are linear to narrowly oblong, 5–7 mm (0.20–0.28 in) long and 0.6–1 mm (0.024–0.039 in) wide, on a petiole 0.5–0.8 mm (0.020–0.031 in) long with stipules 4–6.5 mm (0.16–0.26 in) long at the base. The upper surface of the leaves is minutely pimply, the lower surface mostly concealed, and there is a prominent, downcurved point on the tip. The flowers are white or cream-coloured and borne in head-like clusters of 7 to 15, 9–14 mm (0.35–0.55 in) wide with 6 to 9 egg-shaped floral bracts at the base of each flower. The floral tube is 3.0–3.5 mm (0.12–0.14 in) long and joined at the base for 0.7–0.9 mm (0.028–0.035 in). The sepals are 1.8–2.3 mm (0.071–0.091 in) long and densely hairy, the style about 4 mm (0.16 in) long. Flowering occurs from September to December, and the fruit is a schizocarp 2.5–3 mm (0.098–0.118 in) long.

== Taxonomy and naming ==
Cryptandra intonsa was first formally described in 1995 by Barbara Lynette Rye in the journal Nuytsia from specimens collected in 1993. The specific epithet (intonsa ) means "unshaved" or "bristly", referring to the appearance of the young stems.

== Distribution and habitat ==
This cryptandra grows in heath with scattered mallees and is found from near Middle Iron Cap to near Hatters Hill in the Coolgardie and Mallee bioregions of inland Western Australia.

== Conservation status ==
Cryptandra intonsa is listed as "not threatened" by the Government of Western Australia Department of Biodiversity, Conservation and Attractions.
