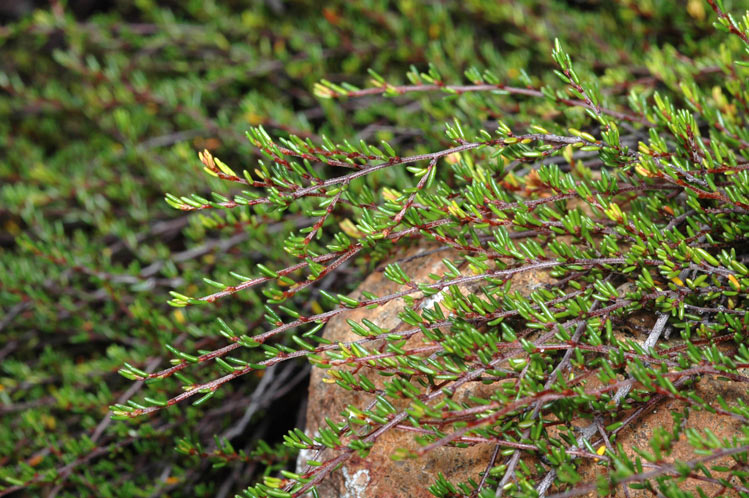

Scientific classification
- Kingdom: Plantae
- Clade: Tracheophytes
- Clade: Angiosperms
- Clade: Eudicots
- Clade: Rosids
- Order: Rosales
- Family: Rhamnaceae
- Genus: Cryptandra
- Species: C. alpina

Binomial name
- Cryptandra alpina Hook.f.

= Cryptandra alpina =

Species of flowering plant

Cryptandra alpina, commonly known as alpine pearlflower, is a species of flowering plant in the family Rhamnaceae and is endemic to Tasmania. It is a small, prostrate shrub with slender branches, linear leaves, and tube-shaped white flowers arranged singly on the ends of branches.

== Description ==
Cryptandra alpina is a prostrate shrub that typically grows to a height of up to 20 cm (7.9 in) and has many slender, wiry branches usually less than 15 cm (5.9 in) long. Its leaves are linear, cylindrical and glabrous, 2–4 mm (0.079–0.157 in) long and 0.5 mm (0.020 in) wide. The flowers are arranged singly on the ends of branches with broad, overlapping brown bracts at the base, the inner bracts often nearly as long as the sepal tube. The sepals are white and joined at the base, forming a tube more than 4 mm (0.16 in) long and woolly hairy on the outside with egg-shaped lobes slightly shorter than the sepal tube. The petals are white, tube-shaped and form a hood over the stamens.

== Taxonomy ==
Cryptandra alpina was first formally described in 1855 by Joseph Dalton Hooker in The botany of the Antarctic voyage of H.M. Discovery ships Erebus and Terror from specimens collected by Ronald Campbell Gunn. The specific epithet (alpina) means "alpine".

== Distribution and habitat ==
Alpine pearlflower grows in alpine and subalpine areas in the Central Plateau area of Tasmania at an altitude of about 3,800 ft (1,200 m).
