= Cryptandra intratropica =

Scientific classification
- Kingdom: Plantae
- Clade: Tracheophytes
- Clade: Angiosperms
- Clade: Eudicots
- Clade: Rosids
- Order: Rosales
- Family: Rhamnaceae
- Genus: Cryptandra
- Species: C. intratropica

Binomial name
- Cryptandra intratropica W.Fitzg.

Species of flowering plant

Cryptandra intratropica is a flowering plant in the family Rhamnaceae and is endemic to the Kimberley region of Western Australia. It is a slender, erect or spreading shrub with wedge-shaped to oblong or egg-shaped leaves and clusters of yellow to cream-coloured, tube-shaped flowers arranged in head-like clusters.

== Description ==
Cryptandra intratropica is a slender, erect or spreading shrub that typically grows to a height of 0.5–2.5 m (1 ft 8 in – 8 ft 2 in), its branchlets not spiny, its young stems covered with rust-coloured, shaggy hairs. The leaves are wedge-shaped to oblong or egg-shaped with the narrower end towards the base, 6.5–11 mm (0.26–0.43 in) long with the edges turned down. The upper surface of the leaves is woolly-hairy, the lower surface shaggy-hairy, and there brown stipules at the base of each leaf. The flowers are yellow or cream-coloured and borne in head-like clusters in leaf axils, each flower on a pedicel much shorter than the sepals and with 5 or more overlapping brown bracts at the base. The sepals are about 2 mm (0.079 in) long, increasing to 4 mm (0.16 in) long in the fruit, and are woolly-hairy, joined to form a top-shaped tube with pale-coloured lobes shorter than the sepal tube. Flowering occurs from March to June.

== Taxonomy and naming ==
Cryptandra intratropica was first formally described in 1918 by William Vincent Fitzgerald in the Journal and Proceedings of the Royal Society of Western Australia from specimens he collected "1,000ft. or more above the base of Mt. Broome". The specific epithet (intratropica ) means "within the Tropics".

== Distribution and habitat ==
This cryptandra grows in a variety of sandstone habitats, mostly in near-coastal areas, mainly between the Bonaparte Archipelago and Talbot Bay in the Central Kimberley, Northern Kimberley and Victoria Bonaparte bioregions of inland Western Australia.

== Conservation status ==
Cryptandra intratropica is listed as "not threatened" by the Government of Western Australia Department of Biodiversity, Conservation and Attractions.
