= Cryptandra inconspicua =

Conservation status
- Priority Two — Poorly Known Taxa (DEC)

Scientific classification
- Kingdom: Plantae
- Clade: Tracheophytes
- Clade: Angiosperms
- Clade: Eudicots
- Clade: Rosids
- Order: Rosales
- Family: Rhamnaceae
- Genus: Cryptandra
- Species: C. inconspicua

Binomial name
- Cryptandra inconspicua Rye

Species of flowering plant

Cryptandra inconspicua is a flowering plant in the family Rhamnaceae and is endemic to the southwest of Western Australia. It is a small, spreading shrub with narrowly elliptic to egg-shaped leaves and head-like clusters of white, tube-shaped flowers.

== Description ==
Cryptandra inconspicua is a spreading, sometimes almost prostrate shrub that typically grows to a height of 10–20 cm (3.9–7.9 in) and unlike others in the genus, lacks spiny branchlets. The leaves are narrowly elliptic to egg-shaped with the narrower end towards the base, 2.0–3.7 mm (0.079–0.146 in) long and 0.7–1.5 mm (0.028–0.059 in) wide, on a petiole 0.3–0.4 mm (0.012–0.016 in) long with stipules 0.7–1.5 mm (0.028–0.059 in) long at the base. The edges of the leaves are rolled under, often concealing the densely hairy lower surface. The flowers are white, borne in head-like clusters of 3 to 8, 2.0–3.5 mm (0.079–0.138 in) wide. The flowers are surrounded by 2 to 4 hairy, egg-shaped bracts. The floral tube is about 0.9 mm (0.035 in) long and densely hairy, the sepals 0.5–0.6 mm (0.020–0.024 in) long and moderately hairy, and the petals are about 0.3 mm (0.012 in) long. Flowering occurs from July to October.

== Taxonomy and naming ==
Cryptandra inconspicua was first formally described in 2007 by Barbara Lynette Rye in the journal Nuytsia from specimens collected by William Blackall between Pingrup and Lake Grace in 1933. The specific epithet (inconspicua ) means "inconspicuous", referring to the size of the plant and its tiny leaves and flowers.

== Distribution ==
This cryptandra has been recorded near Dumbleyung, between Pingrup and Lake Grace, and in the Fitzgerald River National Park in the Avon Wheatbelt, Esperance Plains and Mallee bioregions of south-western Western Australia.

== Conservation status ==
Cryptandra inconspicua is listed as "Priority Two" by the Western Australian Government Department of Biodiversity, Conservation and Attractions, meaning that it is poorly known and from only one or a few locations.
