= Cryptandra triplex =

Scientific classification
- Kingdom: Plantae
- Clade: Tracheophytes
- Clade: Angiosperms
- Clade: Eudicots
- Clade: Rosids
- Order: Rosales
- Family: Rhamnaceae
- Genus: Cryptandra
- Species: C. triplex

Binomial name
- Cryptandra triplex K.R.Thiele ex Kellermann

Species of flowering plant

Cryptandra triplex is a species of flowering plant in the family Rhamnaceae and is endemic to the north of the Northern Territory. It is a hairy shrub with narrowly elliptic to lance-shaped or egg-shaped leaves and white to cream-coloured or yellowish, tube-shaped flowers arranged singly or in groups of up to 5 in leaf axils, near the ends of branches.

== Description ==
Cryptandra triplex is a shrub that typically grows to a height of up to 1.2 m (3 ft 11 in), its young stems, leaves and flowers densely covered with greyish, star-shaped hairs. Its leaves are narrowly elliptic to egg-shaped or lance-shaped with the narrower end towards the base, mostly 10–22 mm (0.39–0.87 in) long and 3–6 mm (0.12–0.24 in) wide on a petiole 0.5–2 mm (0.020–0.079 in) long with linear or narrowly triangular stipules 2.0–3.5 mm (0.079–0.138 in) long at the base. The flowers are borne singly or in groups of up to 5 in leaf axils near the ends of branches with egg-shaped bracts 0.6–1 mm (0.024–0.039 in) long at the base. The flowers are white to cream-coloured or yellowish, the sepals 1.0–1.2 mm (0.039–0.047 in) long and the floral tube 0.4–0.6 mm (0.016–0.024 in) long. The petals are 0.8–1 mm (0.031–0.039 in) long and hooded, the stamens 0.8–0.9 mm (0.031–0.035 in) long. Flowering occurs from February to April, and the fruit is an oval schizocarp 1.6–2.2 mm (0.063–0.087 in) long.

== Taxonomy and naming ==
Cryptandra triplex was first formally described in 2006 by Jürgen Kellermann in the journal Austrobaileya from an unpublished description by Kevin Thiele of specimens collected by Lyndley Craven near east Jabiru in 1981. The specific epithet (triplex) means "threefold", referring to the 3 carpels in the ovary.

== Distribution and habitat ==
This cryptandra grows in shrubland and woodland on sandstone plateaux and rock outcrops, and is only known from Nitmiluk and Kakadu National Parks.
