= Cryptandra leucopogon =

Scientific classification
- Kingdom: Plantae
- Clade: Tracheophytes
- Clade: Angiosperms
- Clade: Eudicots
- Clade: Rosids
- Order: Rosales
- Family: Rhamnaceae
- Genus: Cryptandra
- Species: C. leucopogon

Binomial name
- Cryptandra leucopogon Meisn. ex Reissek

Species of flowering plant

Cryptandra leucopogon is a species of flowering plant in the family Rhamnaceae and is endemic to the southwest of Western Australia. It is a shrub that typically grows to a height of 5–20 cm (2.0–7.9 in) and has white to cream-coloured flowers from July to October. It was first formally described in 1848 by Siegfried Reissek in Plantae Preissianae from an unpublished description by Carl Meissner. The specific epithet (leucopogon) means "white beard".

This cryptandra grows on undulating plains in the Avon Wheatbelt, Coolgardie, Esperance Plains, Jarrah Forest and Mallee bioregions of south-western Western Australia.
