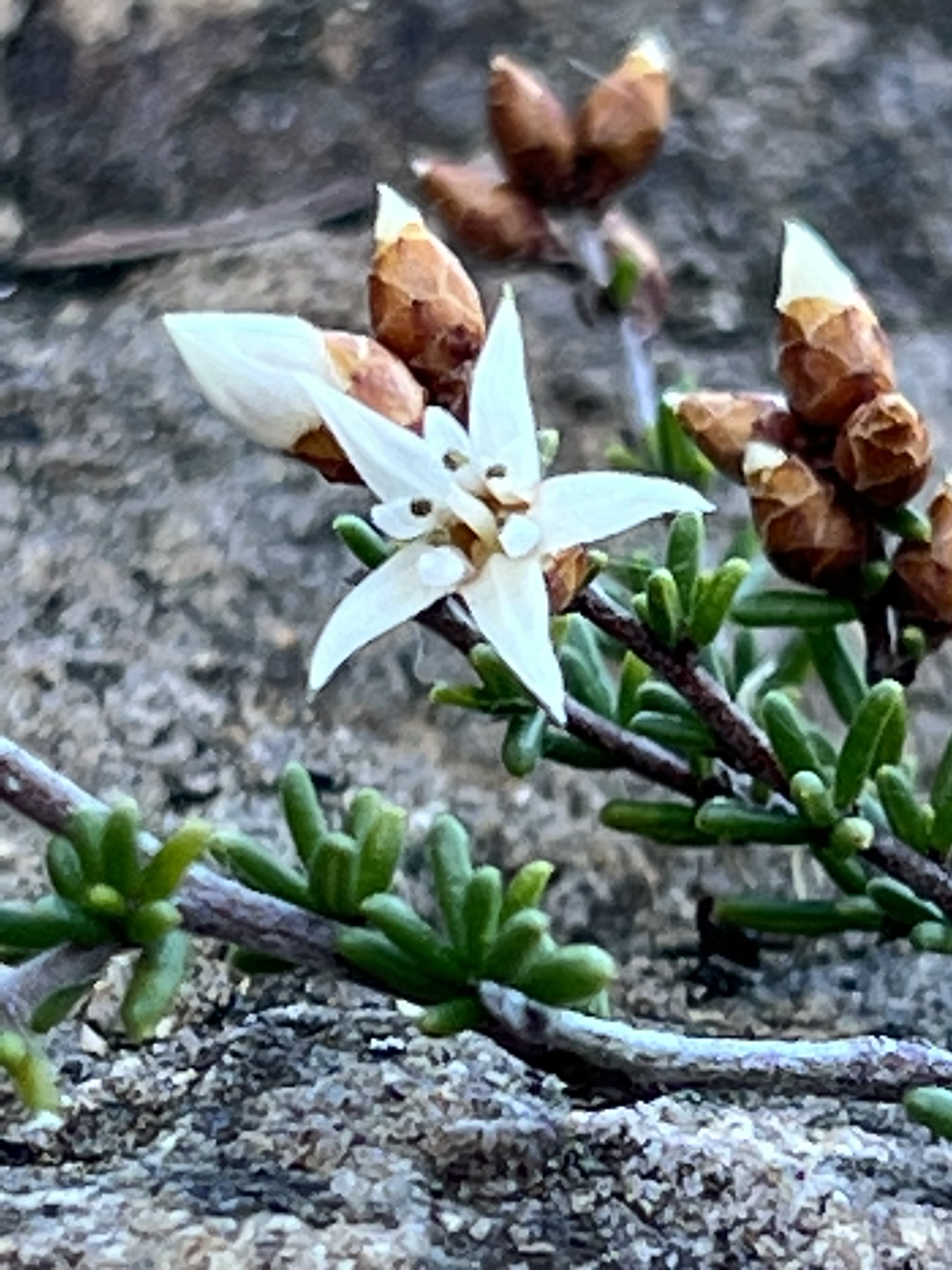

Scientific classification
- Kingdom: Plantae
- Clade: Tracheophytes
- Clade: Angiosperms
- Clade: Eudicots
- Clade: Rosids
- Order: Rosales
- Family: Rhamnaceae
- Genus: Cryptandra
- Species: C. aridicola

Binomial name
- Cryptandra aridicola Rye

= Cryptandra aridicola =

Species of flowering plant

Cryptandra aridicola is a flowering plant in the family Rhamnaceae and is endemic to inland areas of Western Australia. It is a small, spreading shrub with white or pink flowers.

== Description ==
Cryptandra aridicola is usually a spreading shrub to 0.3–0.8 m (1 ft 0 in – 2 ft 7 in) high. The young stems are thickly covered initially with white, matted hairs but soon becoming smooth. The leaves are narrowly elliptic-oblong shaped, 1.4–3.6 mm (0.055–0.142 in) long, 0.6–0.7 mm (0.024–0.028 in) wide, petiole 0.2–0.3 mm (0.0079–0.0118 in) long, upper surface smooth or with minute protuberances, and ending in a recurved point. The flowers are borne singly or in groups of 2-7 per branchlet in a cluster 10–18 mm (0.39–0.71 in) wide, white or sometimes pink. The floral tube is 2.5–3.5 mm (0.098–0.138 in) long, fused portion 0.4–0.6 mm (0.016–0.024 in) long, base half thickly covered with star-shaped hairs, smooth or occasional star-shaped hairs, free section 2.1–2.9 mm (0.083–0.114 in) long, smooth or almost so on base half. Flowering occurs from July to September and the dry fruit is moderately or thickly hairy.

== Taxonomy and naming ==
Cryptandra aridicola was first formally described in 1995 by Barbara Lynette Rye and the description was published in the journal Nuytsia. The specific epithet (aridicola ) means "arid inhabitant".

== Distribution and habitat ==
This cryptandra grows in sandy location over limestone or granite on stoney ridges, hills and plains in the Coolgardie, Great Victoria Desert and Murchison bioregions of inland Western Australia.
