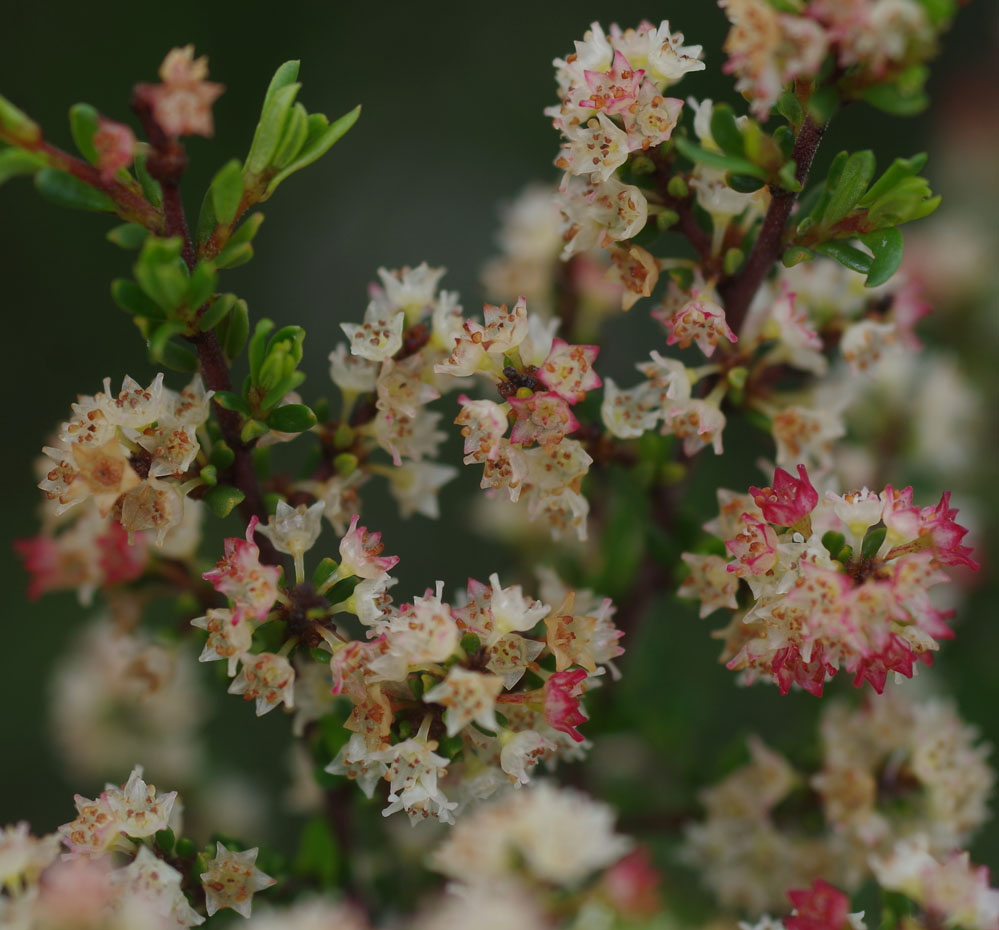

Scientific classification
- Kingdom: Plantae
- Clade: Tracheophytes
- Clade: Angiosperms
- Clade: Eudicots
- Clade: Rosids
- Order: Rosales
- Family: Rhamnaceae
- Genus: Cryptandra
- Species: C. mutila

Binomial name
- Cryptandra mutila Nees ex Reissek

= Cryptandra mutila =

Species of flowering plant

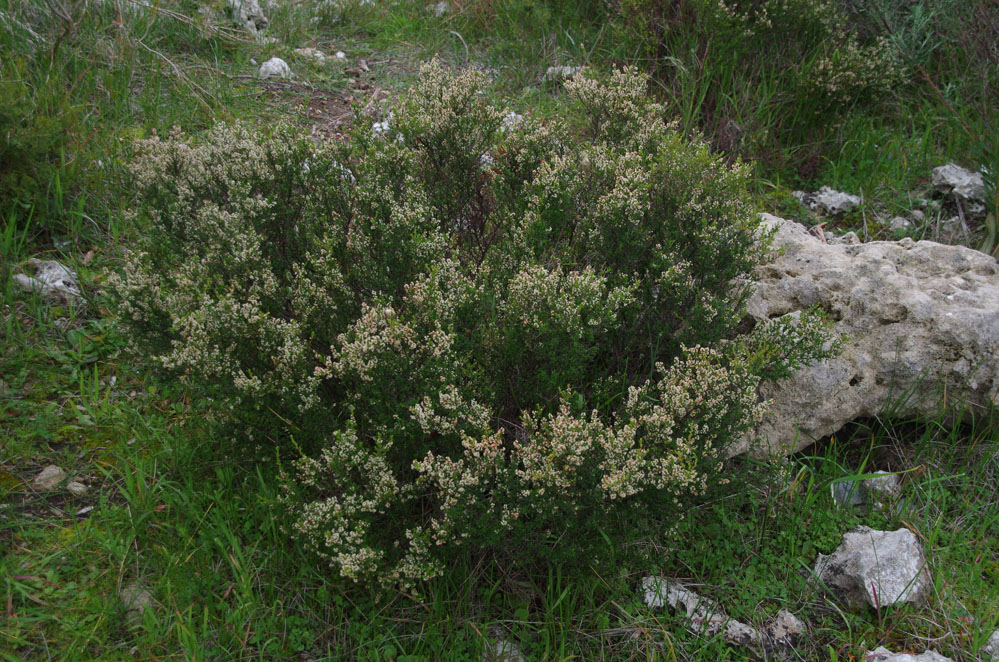
Habit in Beeliar Regional Park

Cryptandra mutila is a flowering plant in the family Rhamnaceae and is endemic to the west coast of Western Australia. It is a rigid, prickly, much-branched shrub with linear leaves and small sessile clusters of white flowers.

== Description ==
Cryptandra mutila is a rigid, prickly, much-branched shrub that typically grows to a height of up to 60 cm (24 in) and has sometimes spiny, wand-like branches covered with stiff hairs. The leaves are mostly linear, 3–5 mm (0.12–0.20 in) long with the edges rolled under. The flowers are arranged in small, dense, sessile clusters in upper leaf axils or on the ends of branches, each flower on a pedicel 2–3 mm (0.079–0.118 in) long with 3 or more minute bracts at the base. The sepals are about 1.5 mm (0.059 in) long with spreading lobes. Flowering occurs in July and August.

== Taxonomy and naming ==
Cryptandra mutila was first formally described in 1848 by Siegfried Reissek in Lehmann's Plantae Preissianae from an unpublished description by Christian Gottfried Daniel Nees von Esenbeck. The specific epithet (mutila) means "maimed" or "mutilated", possibly referring to the twisted appearance of the stamens.

== Distribution ==
This cryptandra grows in sand or sandy clay over limestone on river flats and near salt lakes, in coastal areas of the Geraldton Sandplains, Jarrah Forest, Swan Coastal Plain and Yalgoo bioregions of Western Australia.

== Conservation status ==
Cryptandra mutila is listed as "not threatened" by the Western Australian Government Department of Biodiversity, Conservation and Attractions.
