= Cryptandra scoparia =

Scientific classification
- Kingdom: Plantae
- Clade: Tracheophytes
- Clade: Angiosperms
- Clade: Eudicots
- Clade: Rosids
- Order: Rosales
- Family: Rhamnaceae
- Genus: Cryptandra
- Species: C. scoparia

Binomial name
- Cryptandra scoparia Reissek

Species of flowering plant

Cryptandra scoparia is a species of flowering plant in the family Rhamnaceae and is endemic to the southwest of Western Australia. It is a shrub that typically grows to a height of 20–90 cm (7.9–35.4 in) and has white to cream-coloured flowers from May to June or August. It was first formally described in 1848 by Siegfried Reissek in Plantae Preissianae. The specific epithet (scoparia) means "sweeper", hence "broom-like".

This cryptandra grows in sandy soil over laterite in the Avon Wheatbelt, Geraldton Sandplains, Jarrah Forest and Swan Coastal Plain bioregions of south-western Western Australia.
