= Cryptandra craigiae =

Conservation status
- Priority One — Poorly Known Taxa (DEC)

Scientific classification
- Kingdom: Plantae
- Clade: Tracheophytes
- Clade: Angiosperms
- Clade: Eudicots
- Clade: Rosids
- Order: Rosales
- Family: Rhamnaceae
- Genus: Cryptandra
- Species: C. craigiae

Binomial name
- Cryptandra craigiae Rye

Species of flowering plant

Cryptandra craigiae is a flowering plant in the family Rhamnaceae and is endemic to a restricted area of southern Western Australia. It is a shrub with linear leaves and dense clusters of white or cream-coloured, tube-shaped flowers.

== Description ==
Cryptandra craigiae is a spreading shrub that typically grows to 10–25 cm (3.9–9.8 in) high and up to 35 cm (14 in) wide, its branchlets becoming spiny as the plant matures. The leaves are narrowly oblong to linear, 4–5 mm (0.16–0.20 in) long and 0.6–0.8 mm (0.024–0.031 in) wide, on a petiole 0.4–0.5 mm (0.016–0.020 in) long with stipules 1.5–2.5 mm (0.059–0.098 in) long at the base. The upper surface of the leaves is more or less glabrous and the edges are turned down or rolled under, often concealing the densely hairy lower surface. The flowers are borne in dense clusters of 4 to 6, 4–5 mm (0.16–0.20 in) in diameter, on the ends of branchlets. The floral tube is about 1 mm (0.039 in) long, the sepals 0.8–0.9 mm (0.031–0.035 in) long and hairy. Flowering occurs from May to June.

== Taxonomy and naming ==
Cryptandra craigiae was first formally described in 2007 by Barbara Lynette Rye in the journal Nuytsia from specimens collected by Gillian Craig north-north-east of Hopetoun in 2005. The specific epithet (craigiae ) honours the collector of the type specimens.

== Distribution and habitat ==
This cryptandra mainly grows on sand dunes in or near swampy areas, but is only known from a small area near Hopetoun in the Esperance Plains bioregion of southern Western Australia.

== Conservation status ==
This cryptandra is listed as "Threatened" by the Western Australian Government Department of Biodiversity, Conservation and Attractions, meaning that it is in danger of extinction.
