= Cryptandra distigma =

Scientific classification
- Kingdom: Plantae
- Clade: Tracheophytes
- Clade: Angiosperms
- Clade: Eudicots
- Clade: Rosids
- Order: Rosales
- Family: Rhamnaceae
- Genus: Cryptandra
- Species: C. distigma

Binomial name
- Cryptandra distigma Rye

Species of flowering plant

Cryptandra distigma is a flowering plant in the family Rhamnaceae and is endemic to inland Western Australia. It is a shrub with oblong or narrowly egg-shaped leaves and clusters of white to cream-coloured, tube-shaped flowers.

== Description ==
Cryptandra distigma is a shrub that typically grows to a height of 0.5–1.5 cm (0.20–0.59 in), its young stems densely covered with fine, matted hairs. The leaves are oblong to narrowly egg-shaped with the narrower end towards the base, 1.3–2.4 mm (0.051–0.094 in) long and 0.5–0.6 mm (0.020–0.024 in) wide, on a petiole 0.1–0.3 mm (0.0039–0.0118 in) long with stipules 0.7–1.5 mm (0.028–0.059 in) long at the base. The upper surface of the leaves is glabrous and the edges are rolled under, concealing the lower surface. The flowers are white to cream-coloured and borne in clusters of 3 to 15, 3–8 mm (0.12–0.31 in) wide. The floral tube is 0.8–1.3 mm (0.031–0.051 in) long and joined at the base for 0.4–0.7 mm (0.016–0.028 in). The sepals are 0.9–1.3 mm (0.035–0.051 in) long and hairy, and the style is 0.7–1.3 mm (0.028–0.051 in) long. Flowering mainly occurs from June to September.

== Taxonomy and naming ==
Cryptandra distigma was first formally described in 1995 by Barbara Lynette Rye and the description was published in the journal Nuytsia. The specific epithet (distigma ) means "double stigma", referring to the two lobes of the stigma.

== Distribution and habitat ==
This cryptandra grows in sand on sandplains and dunes from Kirgell Rocks Station to Widgiemooltha and from Wallaroo to the Queen Victoria Spring Nature Reserve in the Coolgardie, Esperance Plains, Great Victoria Desert, Mallee and Murchison bioregions of Western Australia.

== Conservation status ==
Cryptandra distigma is listed as "not threatened" by the Government of Western Australia Department of Biodiversity, Conservation and Attractions.
