= Cryptandra pendula =

Conservation status
- Priority One — Poorly Known Taxa (DEC)

Scientific classification
- Kingdom: Plantae
- Clade: Tracheophytes
- Clade: Angiosperms
- Clade: Eudicots
- Clade: Rosids
- Order: Rosales
- Family: Rhamnaceae
- Genus: Cryptandra
- Species: C. pendula

Binomial name
- Cryptandra pendula Rye

Species of flowering plant

Cryptandra pendula is a flowering plant in the family Rhamnaceae and is endemic to the southwest of Western Australia. It is a shrub with linear leaves and clusters of 5 to 15 pendulous, white, tube-shaped flowers.

== Description ==
Cryptandra pendula is a shrub that typically grows to a height of up to 75 cm (30 in), its branchlets lacking spines. The leaves are linear, 8–10 mm (0.31–0.39 in) long and 0.8–1.3 mm (0.031–0.051 in) wide, on a petiole 0.7–1.1 mm (0.028–0.043 in) long with stipules 0.8–1.3 mm (0.031–0.051 in) long at the base. The edges of the leaves are rolled under, concealing most of the lower surface that is densely covered with white, star-shaped hairs. The flowers are borne in spike-like clusters of 5 to 15 on densely hairy peduncles. The floral tube is 4.0–4.5 mm (0.16–0.18 in) long and joined at the base, the lobes 3.0–3.5 mm (0.12–0.14 in) long. The sepals are about 1.6 mm (0.063 in) long and glabrous. Flowering occurs in July and August.

== Taxonomy and naming ==
Cryptandra pendula was first formally described in 2007 by Barbara Lynette Rye in the journal Nuytsia from specimens collected in 2005 near Allanooka, south-east of Geraldton in the Shire of Irwin. The specific epithet (pendula ) means "drooping", referring to the flowers and fruit.

== Distribution ==
This cryptandra is only known from the type location, where it grows in lateritic gravel on a hillside with several species of Melaleuca in the Geraldton Sandplains bioregion of south-western Western Australia.

== Conservation status ==
Cryptandra pendula is listed as "Priority One" by the Government of Western Australia Department of Biodiversity, Conservation and Attractions, meaning that it is known from only one or a few locations that are potentially at risk.
