= Cryptandra ciliata =

Scientific classification
- Kingdom: Plantae
- Clade: Tracheophytes
- Clade: Angiosperms
- Clade: Eudicots
- Clade: Rosids
- Order: Rosales
- Family: Rhamnaceae
- Genus: Cryptandra
- Species: C. ciliata

Binomial name
- Cryptandra ciliata A.R.Bean

Species of flowering plant

Cryptandra ciliata is a species of flowering plant in the family Rhamnaceae and is endemic to south-eastern Queensland. It is a shrub with clustered linear leaves and densely-hairy, white, tube-shaped flowers.

== Description ==
Cryptandra ciliata is a shrub that typically grows to a height of up to 50 cm (20 in), its branchlets hairy at first but soon glabrous. Its leaves are linear and clustered, mostly 1.7–2.6 mm (0.067–0.102 in) long and 0.4–0.5 mm (0.016–0.020 in) wide on a petiole 0.1–0.2 mm (0.0039–0.0079 in) long, with stipules 1.3–1.8 mm (0.051–0.071 in) long at the base. The upper surface of the leaves is glabrous and the edges are rolled under, usually obscuring most of the lower surface. The flowers are white and borne singly in leaf axils, sometimes forming clusters of up to 10 near the ends of branchlets, each flower with 7 to 10 bracts at the base. The floral tube is 0.7–1.2 mm (0.028–0.047 in) long, the sepals 1.5–2.2 mm (0.059–0.087 in) long and densely covered with both simple and star-shaped hairs. The petals are 0.7–0.8 mm (0.028–0.031 in) long, forming a hood over the stamens 0.5–0.7 mm (0.020–0.028 in) long. Flowering occurs from May to August, and the fruit is brown and 2.7–3.0 mm (0.11–0.12 in) long.

== Taxonomy and naming ==
Cryptandra ciliata was first formally described in 2004 by Anthony Bean in the journal Austrobaileya from specimens collected near Cracow by Paul Irwin Forster in 1990. The specific epithet (ciliata) means "fringed with fine hairs", referring to the bracts.

== Distribution and habitat ==
This cryptandra grows in woodland on sandstone ridges and slopes from the Barakula State Forest to near Theodore in south-east Queensland.
