= Cryptandra wilsonii =

Scientific classification
- Kingdom: Plantae
- Clade: Tracheophytes
- Clade: Angiosperms
- Clade: Eudicots
- Clade: Rosids
- Order: Rosales
- Family: Rhamnaceae
- Genus: Cryptandra
- Species: C. wilsonii

Binomial name
- Cryptandra wilsonii Rye

Species of flowering plant

Cryptandra wilsonii is a flowering plant in the family Rhamnaceae and is endemic to the south-west of Western Australia. It is a shrub with hairy young stems, oblong to narrowly oblong leaves and clusters of white, tube-shaped flowers arranged in small clusters.

== Description ==
Cryptandra wilsonii is a shrub that typically grows to a height of 15–90 cm (5.9–35.4 in), its young stems covered with both star-shaped and straight hairs, the branchlets sometimes spiny. The leaves are oblong to narrowly oblong, 1.8–3.2 mm (0.071–0.126 in) long and 0.5–0.7 mm (0.020–0.028 in) wide, on a petiole 0.3–0.5 mm (0.012–0.020 in) long with stipules 0.8–1.4 mm (0.031–0.055 in) long at the base. The upper surface of the leaves is glabrous, the lower surface is usually concealed and the tip of the leaf curves downwards. The flowers are white and arranged in spike-like or head-like clusters of 2 to 6, with about 6 or 7 broadly egg-shaped floral bracts 1.2–1.6 mm (0.047–0.063 in) long at the base. The floral tube is 1.4–1.9 mm (0.055–0.075 in) long joined at the base for about 0.5 mm (0.020 in). The sepals are 1.2–1.6 mm (0.047–0.063 in) long, the style 0.7–1.3 mm (0.028–0.051 in) long. Flowering occurs from May to August, and the fruit is a schizocarp about 3 mm (0.12 in) long and densely covered with star-shaped hairs.

== Taxonomy and naming ==
Cryptandra wilsonii was first formally described in 1995 by Barbara Lynette Rye in the journal Nuytsia from specimens collected near Cape Riche Beach in 1974. The specific epithet (wilsonii ) honours the Australian botanist, Paul G. Wilson.

== Distribution and habitat ==
This cryptandra usually grows in sandy soil, sometimes in mallee scrub, and occurs from north-east of Wialki to Cape Riche and near Gibson in the Avon Wheatbelt, Coolgardie, Esperance Plains, Jarrah Forest and Mallee bioregions of Western Australia.

== Conservation status ==
Cryptandra wilsonii is listed as "not threatened" by the Government of Western Australia Department of Biodiversity, Conservation and Attractions.
