= Cryptandra gemmata =

Scientific classification
- Kingdom: Plantae
- Clade: Tracheophytes
- Clade: Angiosperms
- Clade: Eudicots
- Clade: Rosids
- Order: Rosales
- Family: Rhamnaceae
- Genus: Cryptandra
- Species: C. gemmata

Binomial name
- Cryptandra gemmata A.R.Bean

Species of flowering plant

Cryptandra gemmata is a species of flowering plant in the family Rhamnaceae and is endemic to the far north of the Northern Territory. It is a shrub with clustered linear leaves and white to creamy-white, tube-shaped flowers.

== Description ==
Cryptandra gemmata is a shrub that typically grows to a height of 20–30 cm (7.9–11.8 in), its young branchlets covered with star-shaped hairs. Its leaves are linear and needle-shaped in clusters of 3 to 9, each leaf 0.8–1.1 mm (0.031–0.043 in) long, 0.3–0.4 mm (0.012–0.016 in) wide and sessile, with narrowly triangular stipules 1.0–1.3 mm (0.039–0.051 in) long at the base. The upper surface of the leaves is glabrous and the lower surface is rarely visible. The flowers are borne in clusters of 3 to 5 on the ends of branchlets with elliptic brown bracts 1.9–2.2 mm (0.075–0.087 in) long at the base. The sepals are white to creamy-white, forming a cylindrical to urn-shaped tube 1.6–1.7 mm (0.063–0.067 in) long with lobes 0.8–1.1 mm (0.031–0.043 in) long. The petals protrude 0.5–0.6 mm (0.020–0.024 in) beyond the sepal tube, and form a hood over the stamens. Flowering has been observed in April, and the fruit is an oval schizocarp 2.5–2.9 mm (0.098–0.114 in) long.

== Taxonomy and naming ==
Cryptandra gemmata was first formally described in 2004 by Anthony Bean in the journal Austrobaileya from specimens collected east of Jabiru in 1989. The specific epithet (gemmata) means "provided with buds", referring to the development of buds around existing flowers and fruits.

== Distribution and habitat ==
This cryptandra grows on sandstone pavement with little or no soil and is only known from near Jabiru in the far north of the Northern Territory.
