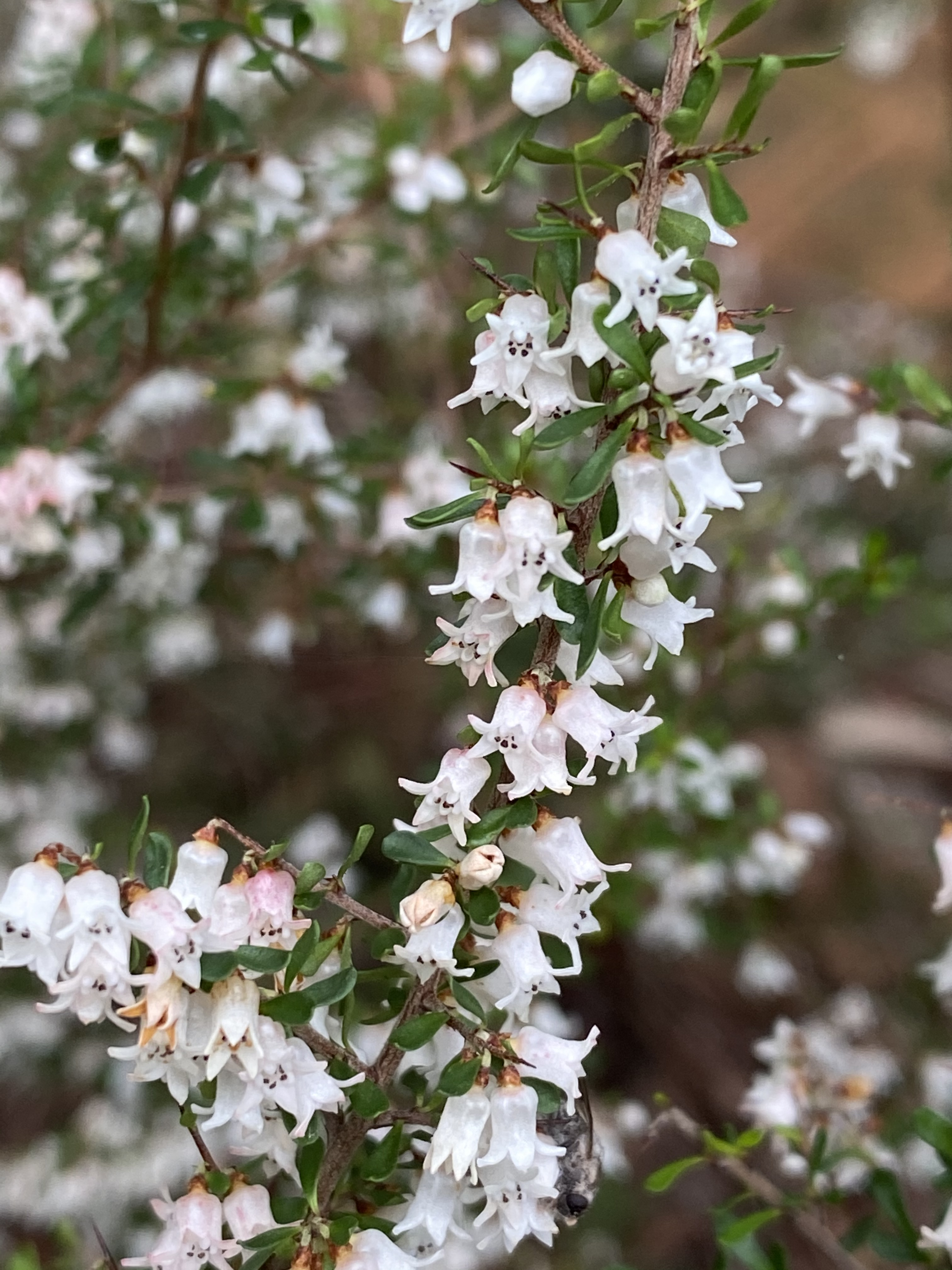
- In the Australian National Botanic Gardens

Scientific classification
- Kingdom: Plantae
- Clade: Tracheophytes
- Clade: Angiosperms
- Clade: Eudicots
- Clade: Rosids
- Order: Rosales
- Family: Rhamnaceae
- Genus: Cryptandra
- Species: C. spinescens

Binomial name
- Cryptandra spinescens Sieber ex DC.

= Cryptandra spinescens =

Species of flowering plant

Cryptandra spinescens is a species of flowering plant in the family Rhamnaceae and is endemic to New South Wales. It is a straggling, much-branched shrub with spiny side-branches, egg-shaped to lance-shaped leaves, and spike-like clusters of white, tube-shaped flowers.

== Description ==
Cryptandra spinescens is a straggling, much-branched shrub that typically grows to a height of up to 1 m (3 ft 3 in), its side branches less than 10 mm (0.39 in) long and ending in a sharp spine. The leaves are arranged in clusters, egg-shaped with the narrower end towards the base, or lance-shaped, usually 2–4 mm (0.079–0.157 in) long and 1–2 mm (0.039–0.079 in) wide with minute stipules at the base. Both surfaces of the leaves are more or less glabrous. The flowers are usually borne singly on short side-branches in spike-like clusters with bracts at the base of each flower. The floral tube is white, tube-shaped, and 3–4 mm (0.12–0.16 in) long with 5 lobes.Flowering occurs from winter to early spring.

== Taxonomy and naming ==
Cryptandra spinescens was first formally described in 1825 by Augustin Pyramus de Candolle in Prodromus Systematis Naturalis Regni Vegetabilis from an unpublished description by Franz Sieber. The specific epithet (spinescens) means "spinescent".

== Distribution and habitat ==
This cryptandra usually grows in open forest, often in rocky places, on the coast and nearby ranges between the Hunter Valley, Bungonia National Park and Tullibigeal in eastern New South Wales.
