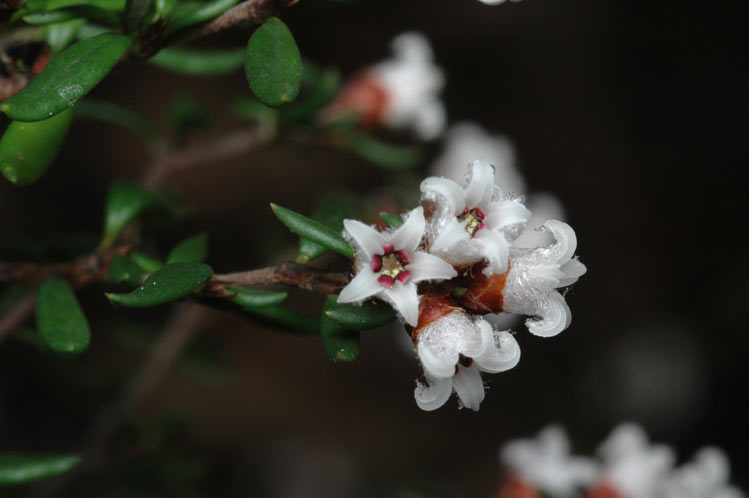
- In the Australian National Botanic Gardens

Scientific classification
- Kingdom: Plantae
- Clade: Tracheophytes
- Clade: Angiosperms
- Clade: Eudicots
- Clade: Rosids
- Order: Rosales
- Family: Rhamnaceae
- Genus: Cryptandra
- Species: C. lanosiflora

Binomial name
- Cryptandra lanosiflora F.Muell.

= Cryptandra lanosiflora =

Species of flowering plant

Cryptandra lanosiflora is a species of flowering plant in the family Rhamnaceae and is endemic to eastern Australia. It is a shrub with many branches, linear leaves, and hairy, white tube-shaped flowers.

== Description ==
Cryptandra lanosiflora is a shrub that typically grows to a height of up to 60 cm (24 in) and has many branchlets 1–3 cm (0.39–1.18 in) long and covered with hairs when young. The leaves are linear and often clustered, mostly 2–4 mm (0.079–0.157 in) long and 1–2 mm (0.039–0.079 in) wide on a petiole 0.2–0.5 mm (0.0079–0.0197 in) long. There are narrow triangular stipules 0.9–1.8 mm (0.035–0.071 in) long at the base of the petioles. The edges of the leaves are rolled under, the upper surface more or less glabrous, the lower surface white, but usually obscured. The flowers are usually borne on short side branches with dark brown, overlapping bracts 1.8–2.1 mm (0.071–0.083 in) long at the base. The floral tube is about 5 mm (0.20 in) long, the lobes 1.0–1.6 mm (0.039–0.063 in) long and the petals are white, protruding slightly beyond the end of the floral tube, and hooded. Flowering occurs in September and October and the fruit is an oval capsule 2.3–2.6 mm (0.091–0.102 in) long, the seeds with a white aril.

== Taxonomy and naming ==
Cryptandra lanosiflora was first formally described in 1862 by Ferdinand von Mueller in Fragmenta Phytographiae Australiae from specimens collected by Hermann Beckler.

== Distribution and habitat ==
This cryptandra grows in heath and open forest in exposed, rocky place from Stanthorpe in south-eastern Queensland to Werrikimbe National Park and the Liverpool Range in New South Wales.
