= Cryptandra stellulata =

Conservation status
- Priority Three — Poorly Known Taxa (DEC)

Scientific classification
- Kingdom: Plantae
- Clade: Tracheophytes
- Clade: Angiosperms
- Clade: Eudicots
- Clade: Rosids
- Order: Rosales
- Family: Rhamnaceae
- Genus: Cryptandra
- Species: C. stellulata

Binomial name
- Cryptandra stellulata Rye

Species of flowering plant

Cryptandra stellulata is a flowering plant in the family Rhamnaceae and is endemic to the southwest of Western Australia. It is a shrub with spiny branches, narrowly oblong to linear leaves and spike-like clusters of 2 to 12 white, tube-shaped flowers.

== Description ==
Cryptandra stellulata is a shrub that typically grows to a height of 0.3–1 m (1 ft 0 in – 3 ft 3 in), its branchlets usually spiny. The leaves are narrowly oblong to linear, 4–12 mm (0.16–0.47 in) long and 0.7–1.8 mm (0.028–0.071 in) wide, on a petiole 0.6–0.8 mm (0.024–0.031 in) long with stipules 0.8–1 mm (0.031–0.039 in) long at the base. The edges of the leaves are curved down or rolled under, usually concealing most of the lower surface that is densely covered with white, star-shaped hairs. The flowers are borne in spike-like clusters of 2 to 12 on densely hairy peduncles. The floral tube is 1.7–2.5 mm (0.067–0.098 in) long, the sepals 1.3–1.5 mm (0.051–0.059 in) long and glabrous, and the petals about 1 mm (0.039 in) long. Flowering occurs in August and September.

== Taxonomy and naming ==
Cryptandra stellulata was first formally described in 2007 by Barbara Lynette Rye in the journal Nuytsia from specimens collected in 1997 near Morawa. The specific epithet (stellulata ) means "with little stars", referring to the hairs on the stems.

== Distribution ==
This cryptandra grows on rocky hills between Carnamah and Yandanooka in the Avon Wheatbelt and Swan Coastal Plain bioregions of south-western Western Australia.

== Conservation status ==
Cryptandra stellulata is listed as "Priority Three" by the Government of Western Australia Department of Biodiversity, Conservation and Attractions, meaning that it is poorly known and known from only a few locations but is not under imminent threat.
