= Cryptandra apetala =

Scientific classification
- Kingdom: Plantae
- Clade: Tracheophytes
- Clade: Angiosperms
- Clade: Eudicots
- Clade: Rosids
- Order: Rosales
- Family: Rhamnaceae
- Genus: Cryptandra
- Species: C. apetala

Binomial name
- Cryptandra apetala Ewart & Jean White

Species of flowering plant

Cryptandra apetala is a species of flowering plant in the family Rhamnaceae and is endemic to the south-west of Western Australia. It is a shrub with tufted, linear to lance-shaped leaves, and urn-shaped white to creamy-white and pink flowers arranged on short side shoots.

== Description ==
Cryptandra apetala is a woody shrub that typically grows to a height of up to 15–50 cm (5.9–19.7 in). The leaves are arranged in tufts, linear to lance-shaped with the edges rolled under, so that the leaves appear cylindrical. The flowers are white to creamy-white and pink, arranged in clusters of 2 to 8 on short side shoots. The bracts are brown and shorter than the sepals lobes. The sepals are about 2 mm (0.079 in) long and joined at the base to form an urn-shaped tube, the tube and sepals lobes densely covered with soft hairs. There are no petals but the stamens have relatively large anthers. Flowering occurs from August to October.

== Taxonomy ==
Cryptandra apetala was first formally described in 1909 by Alfred James Ewart and Jean White-Haney in the Proceedings of the Royal Society of Victoria from specimens collected near Cowcowing by Max Koch. The specific epithet (apetala) means "without petals".

In 1995, Barbara Lynette Rye described two varieties of C. apetala in the journal Nuytsia, and the names are accepted by the Australian Plant Census:

- Cryptandra apetala var. anomala Rye
- Cryptandra apetala Rye var. apetala

== Distribution and habitat ==
This cryptandra grows on sandy soil in the Avon Wheatbelt, Coolgardie, Geraldton Sandplains, Mallee and Yalgoo bioregions of south-western Western Australia.

== Conservation status ==
Both varieties of C. apetala are listed as "not threatened" by the Western Australian Government Department of Biodiversity, Conservation and Attractions.
