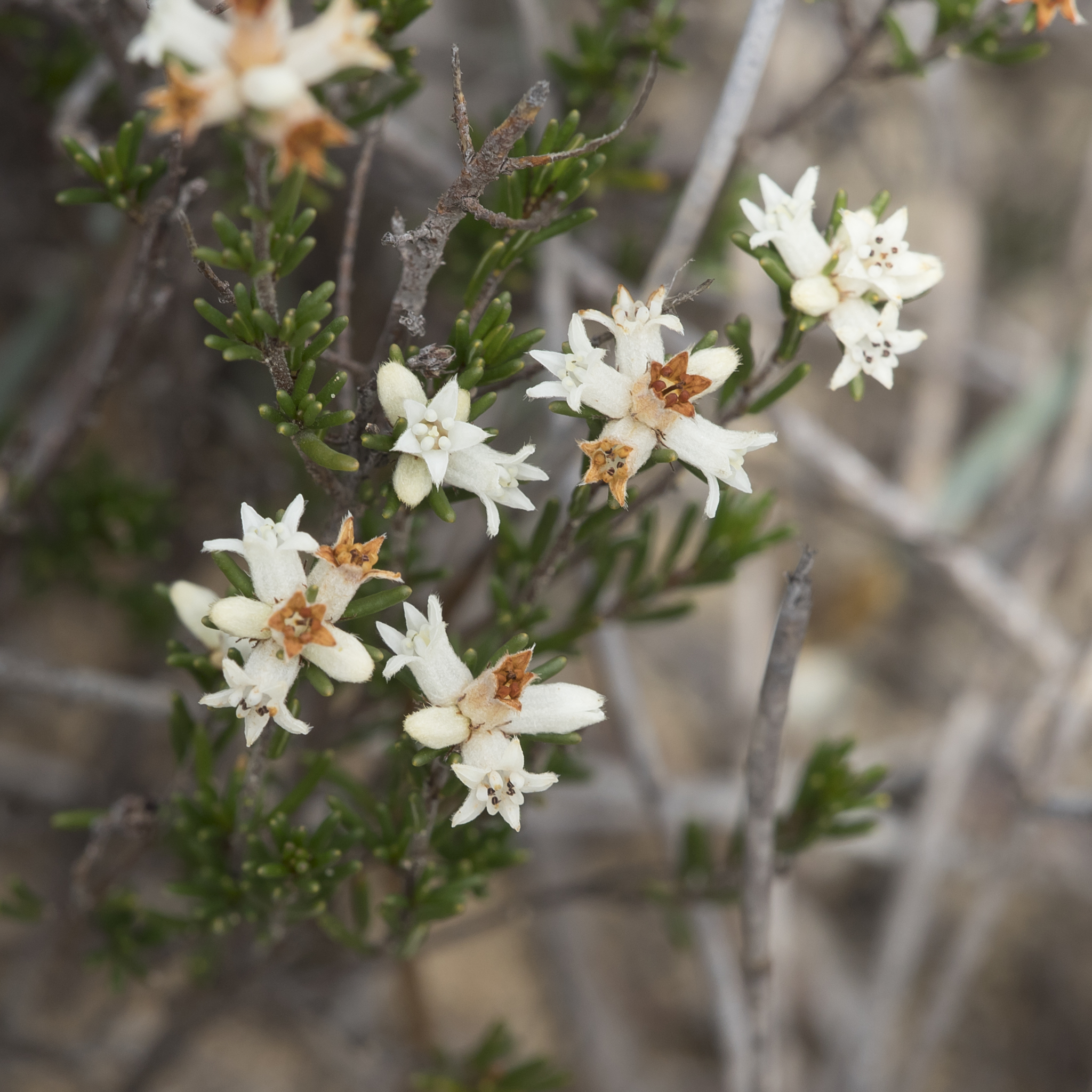
- In Cox Scrub Conservation Park

Scientific classification
- Kingdom: Plantae
- Clade: Tracheophytes
- Clade: Angiosperms
- Clade: Eudicots
- Clade: Rosids
- Order: Rosales
- Family: Rhamnaceae
- Genus: Cryptandra
- Species: C. hispidula

Binomial name
- Cryptandra hispidula Reissek & F.Muell.

= Cryptandra hispidula =

Species of flowering plant

Cryptandra hispidula, commonly known as rough cryptandra, is a species of flowering plant in the family Rhamnaceae and is endemic to South Australia. It is a small shrub with clustered, cylindrical leaves, and tube-shaped white flowers surrounded by leafy bracts.

== Description ==
Cryptandra hispidula is a shrub that typically grows to a height of 20–30 cm (7.9–11.8 in), its branchlets covered with star-shaped hairs and rough. The leaves are clustered and more or less needle-shaped, 3–6 mm (0.12–0.24 in) long and about 0.5 mm (0.020 in) wide with the edges rolled under, concealing the lower surface. The flowers are sessile, arranged in clusters of up to 8 at the ends of branches and are white, tube-shaped, 4–6 mm (0.16–0.24 in) long and surrounded by 4 or 5 hairy brown bracts about half as long as the floral tube. The sepals are 3–4 mm (0.12–0.16 in) long and silky-hairy, the style nearly as long as the floral tube. Flowering occurs in most months.

== Taxonomy ==
Cryptandra hispidula was first formally described in 1858 by Siegfried Reissek and Ferdinand von Mueller in the journal Linnaea from specimens collected by Charles Stuart. The specific epithet (hispidula) means "somewhat rough".

== Distribution and habitat ==
Rough cryptandra mainly grows in swampy country on Kangaroo Island and the southern Mount Lofty Ranges of South Australia.
