= Cryptandra glabriflora =

Conservation status
- Priority Two — Poorly Known Taxa (DEC)

Scientific classification
- Kingdom: Plantae
- Clade: Tracheophytes
- Clade: Angiosperms
- Clade: Eudicots
- Clade: Rosids
- Order: Rosales
- Family: Rhamnaceae
- Genus: Cryptandra
- Species: C. glabriflora

Binomial name
- Cryptandra glabriflora Benth.

Species of flowering plant

Cryptandra glabriflora is a flowering plant in the family Rhamnaceae and is endemic to Kalbarri National Park in Western Australia. It is a low shrub with linear or oblong leaves and clusters of white or pink, tube-shaped flowers.

== Description ==
Cryptandra glabriflora is a shrub that typically grows to a height of 10–50 cm (3.9–19.7 in), and has many rigid, glabrous, spiny branches. The leaves are linear to oblong, 2–4 mm (0.079–0.157 in) long and glabrous, with the edges rolled under. The flowers are white or pink, sessile, clustered along the branches and more or less glabrous. The floral tube is broadly bell-shaped, 2.1–2.6 mm (0.083–0.102 in) long, surrounded by broad, overlapping bracts and has spreading lobes. Flowering occurs from May to August.

== Taxonomy and naming ==
Cryptandra glabriflora was first formally described in 1863 by George Bentham in Flora Australiensis from specimens collected near the Murchison River by Augustus Oldfield. The specific epithet (glabriflora ) means "glabrous-flowered".

== Distribution and habitat ==
This cryptandra is only known from Kalbarri National Park where it grows on plains in sand or gravelly soils.

== Conservation status ==
This cryptandra is listed as "Priority Two" by the Western Australian Government Department of Biodiversity, Conservation and Attractions, meaning that it is poorly known and from only one or a few locations.
