= Cryptandra nola =

Conservation status
- Priority Three — Poorly Known Taxa (DEC)

Scientific classification
- Kingdom: Plantae
- Clade: Tracheophytes
- Clade: Angiosperms
- Clade: Eudicots
- Clade: Rosids
- Order: Rosales
- Family: Rhamnaceae
- Genus: Cryptandra
- Species: C. nola

Binomial name
- Cryptandra nola Rye

Species of flowering plant

Cryptandra nola is a flowering plant in the family Rhamnaceae and is endemic to the western region of Western Australia. It is an erect or spreading, spiny shrub with oblong to elliptic leaves and clusters of white, tube-shaped flowers.

== Description ==
Cryptandra nola is an erect or spreading shrub that typically grows to a height of 0.3–1 m (1 ft 0 in – 3 ft 3 in), and has spiny branchlets. The leaves are oblong to elliptic or narrowly elliptic, 1.2–2.2 mm (0.047–0.087 in) long and 0.4–0.5 mm (0.016–0.020 in) wide, on a petiole 0.2–0.4 mm (0.0079–0.0157 in) long with stipules 0.7–1.5 mm (0.028–0.059 in) long at the base. The upper surface of the leaves is minutely hairy to glabrous, the lower surface mostly concealed. The flowers are white and arranged singly, or in groups of up to 8, forming a cluster 7–11 mm (0.28–0.43 in) wide, with about 8 broadly egg-shaped floral bracts about 1.8 mm (0.071 in) long. The floral tube is hairy, 2.0–2.5 mm (0.079–0.098 in) long joined at the base for 0.5 mm (0.020 in). The sepals are about 1.5 mm (0.059 in) long and hairy, the style 2.0–2.5 mm (0.079–0.098 in) long. Flowering mainly occurs from June to August, and the fruit is a schizocarp.

== Taxonomy and naming ==
Cryptandra nola was first formally described in 1995 by Barbara Lynette Rye in the journal Nuytsia from specimens collected near Mullewa in 1994. The specific epithet (nola ) means "small bell", referring to the shape of the flowers.

== Distribution and habitat ==
This cryptandra grows in sandy soil over granite in the Avon Wheatbelt and Geraldton Sandplains bioregions of Western Australia.

== Conservation status ==
Cryptandra nola is listed as "Priority Three" by the Government of Western Australia Department of Biodiversity, Conservation and Attractions, meaning that it is poorly known and known from only a few locations but is not under imminent threat.
