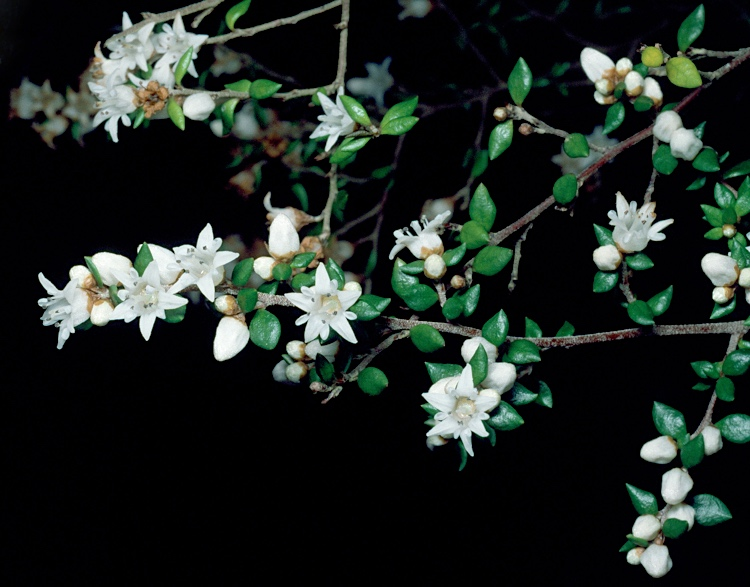
- In the Australian National Botanic Gardens

Scientific classification
- Kingdom: Plantae
- Clade: Tracheophytes
- Clade: Angiosperms
- Clade: Eudicots
- Clade: Rosids
- Order: Rosales
- Family: Rhamnaceae
- Genus: Cryptandra
- Species: C. longistaminea

Binomial name
- Cryptandra longistaminea F.Muell.

= Cryptandra longistaminea =

Species of flowering plant

Cryptandra longistaminea is a species of flowering plant in the family Rhamnaceae and is endemic to eastern Australia. It is a shrub with many branches, egg-shaped or elliptic to linear leaves, and clusters of white, tube-shaped flowers.

== Description ==
Cryptandra longistaminea is a shrub that typically grows to a height of 50–80 cm (20–31 in) and has many branchlets 10–30 cm (3.9–11.8 in) long but that are not spiny. The leaves are egg-shaped or elliptic to linear, mostly 1.8–4 mm (0.071–0.157 in) long and 0.9–1.7 mm (0.035–0.067 in) wide on a petiole 0.2–0.6 mm (0.0079–0.0236 in) long. There are narrow triangular stipules 0.6–1.1 mm (0.024–0.043 in) long at the base of the petioles. The edges of the leaves are curved downwards, the upper surface glabrous, the lower surface densely covered with white, star-shaped hairs. The flowers are usually borne in clusters on smaller branches with brown, overlapping bracts 1.0–1.2 mm (0.039–0.047 in) long at the base. The floral tube is white to creamy-white, 1.0–1.3 mm (0.039–0.051 in) long, the lobes spreading, 1.7–2.0 mm (0.067–0.079 in) long and the petals white, protruding 1.4–1.8 mm (0.055–0.071 in) beyond the end of the floral tube, and hooded. Flowering occurs from June to September.

== Taxonomy and naming ==
Cryptandra longistaminea was first formally described in 1862 by Ferdinand von Mueller in Fragmenta Phytographiae Australiae from specimens collected near the Severn River. The specific epithet (longistaminea) means "long stamens".

== Distribution and habitat ==
This cryptandra mainly grows in open forest, south from about Gladstone in south-eastern Queensland to Grafton in New South Wales. It also occurs in scattered populations north from Gilgandra on the slopes and in mallee communities north of Hillston in inland New South Wales.
