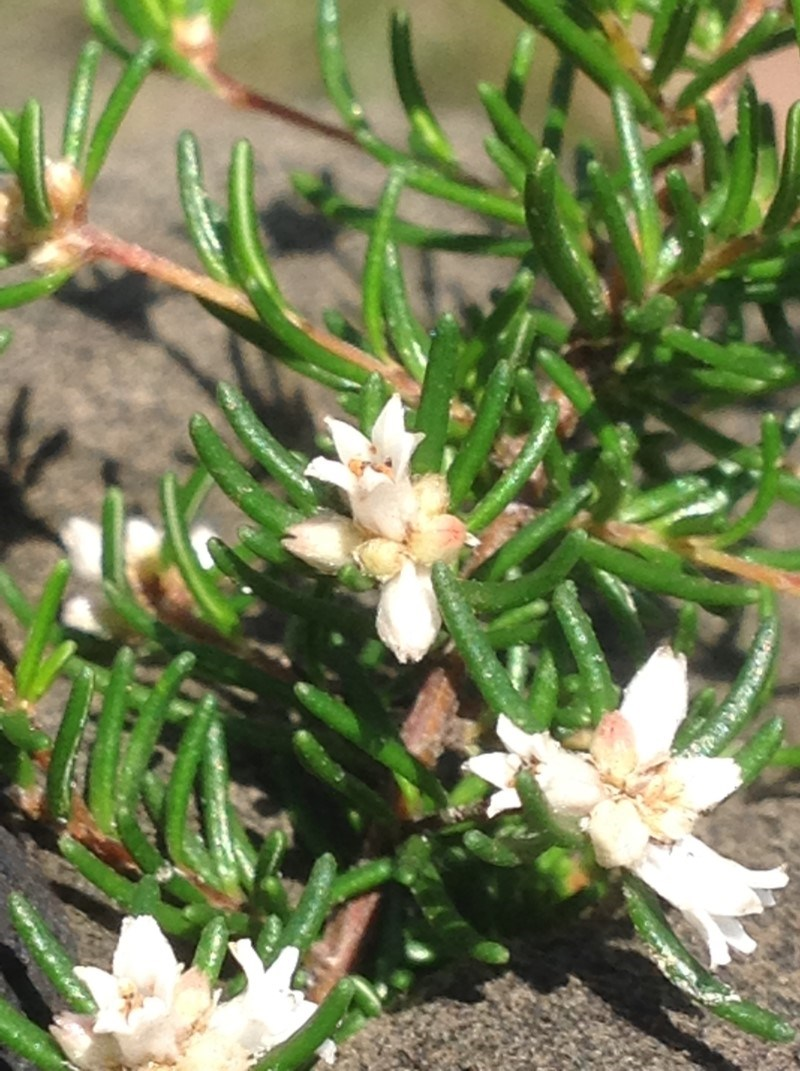
- Near Jervis Bay

Scientific classification
- Kingdom: Plantae
- Clade: Tracheophytes
- Clade: Angiosperms
- Clade: Eudicots
- Clade: Rosids
- Order: Rosales
- Family: Rhamnaceae
- Genus: Cryptandra
- Species: C. ericoides

Binomial name
- Cryptandra ericoides Sm.

Synonyms
- Cryptandra capitata Benth. nom. inval., pro syn.; Cryptandra ericifolia Rudge orth. var.

= Cryptandra ericoides =

Species of flowering plant

Cryptandra ericoides, commonly known as heathy cryptandra, is a species of flowering plant in the family Rhamnaceae and is endemic to south-eastern continental Australia. It is a wiry, low-lying to erect shrub with often clustered, cylindrical leaves, and tube-shaped white flowers arranged in clusters on the ends of branchlets.

== Description ==
Cryptandra ericoides is a wiry, low-lying to erect shrub that typically grows to a height of up to 60 cm (24 in), its young branchlets with soft hairs pressed against the surface. The leaves are more or less cylindrical but with a groove along the lower surface, 2–10 mm (0.079–0.394 in) long and 0.5–1 mm (0.020–0.039 in) wide with stipules up to 1 mm (0.039 in) long at the base. The leaves are often clustered at the ends of branchlets. The flowers are arranged in clusters of up to 10 at the ends of branches and are white, bell-shaped and 3–4 mm (0.12–0.16 in) long. The sepals are about half the length of the floral tube, the petals about 0.5 mm (0.020 in) long. Flowering mainly occurs from February to June and the fruit is a capsule about 2.5 mm (0.098 in) long.

== Taxonomy ==
Cryptandra ericoides was first formally described in 1808 by James Edward Smith in The Cyclopaedia from specimens collected by "Dr. White". The specific epithet (ericoides) means "Erica-like".

== Distribution and habitat ==
Heathy cryptandra mainly grows in heath on the coast of new South Wales south from the Sydney region. It is also found in the extreme east of Victoria.

== Conservation status ==
Cryptandra ericoides is listed as "critically endangered" in Victoria, under the Flora and Fauna Guarantee Act 1988.
