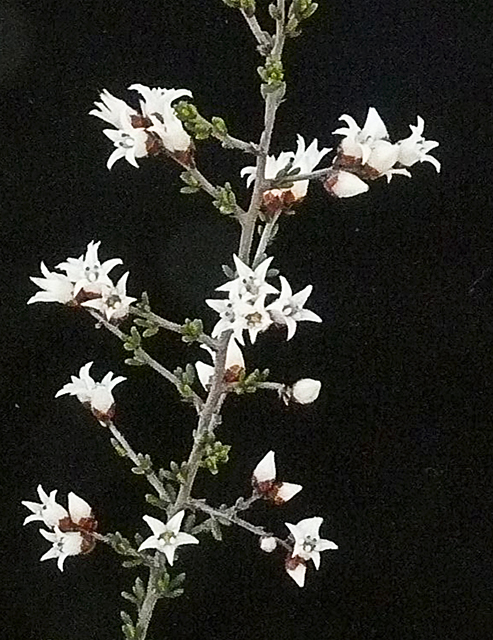
- In the Scotia Sanctuary

Scientific classification
- Kingdom: Plantae
- Clade: Tracheophytes
- Clade: Angiosperms
- Clade: Eudicots
- Clade: Rosids
- Order: Rosales
- Family: Rhamnaceae
- Genus: Cryptandra
- Species: C. magniflora

Binomial name
- Cryptandra magniflora F.Muell.

Synonyms
- Cryptandra propinqua var. grandiflora Benth.; Cryptandra propinqua auct. non A.Cunn. ex Fenzl

= Cryptandra magniflora =

Species of flowering plant

Cryptandra magniflora is a species of flowering plant in the family Rhamnaceae and is endemic to Victoria (Australia). It is a shrub with cylindrical leaves, and clusters of white, tube-shaped flowers.

== Description ==
Cryptandra magniflora is usually a twiggy, widely branched shrub that typically grows to a height of up to about 1 m (3 ft 3 in), its branches usually not spiny. The leaves are cylindrical, mostly 1.5–5 mm (0.059–0.197 in) long, 0.5–1.0 mm (0.020–0.039 in) wide and sessile or on a short petiole, and grooved on the lower side. There are triangular to egg-shaped stipules 1.2–2.0 mm (0.047–0.079 in) long at the base of the petioles. The upper surface is mostly glabrous, the lower surface hairy. The flowers are borne in clusters of up to 10 in leaf axils with dark brown to black, egg-shaped to elliptic bracts 1.6–4 mm (0.063–0.157 in) long at the base. The floral tube is white, 3.5–6 mm (0.14–0.24 in) long, the sepals 1.8–3.5 mm (0.071–0.138 in) long and the petals 0.9–1.5 mm (0.035–0.059 in) long.

== Taxonomy and naming ==
Cryptandra magniflora was first formally described in 1862 by Ferdinand von Mueller in Fragmenta Phytographiae Australiae from specimens collected near the junction of the Murray and Darling Rivers. The specific epithet (magniflora) means "large-flowered".

== Distribution and habitat ==
This cryptandra mainly grows in mallee, north of Ouyen in north-west Victoria.
