= Cryptandra imbricata =

Scientific classification
- Kingdom: Plantae
- Clade: Tracheophytes
- Clade: Angiosperms
- Clade: Eudicots
- Clade: Rosids
- Order: Rosales
- Family: Rhamnaceae
- Genus: Cryptandra
- Species: C. imbricata

Binomial name
- Cryptandra imbricata Rye

Species of flowering plant

Cryptandra imbricata is a flowering plant in the family Rhamnaceae and is endemic to the southwest of Western Australia. It is a spreading shrub with spiny, interlaced branchlets, narrowly oblong to linear leaves and spike-like clusters of white, tube-shaped flowers.

== Description ==
Cryptandra imbricata is a spreading, often dome-shaped shrub that typically grows to a height of 0.5–1.5 m (1 ft 8 in – 4 ft 11 in) and has interlaced branches and spiny branchlets 5–20 mm (0.20–0.79 in) long with leaves in clusters. The leaves are narrowly oblong to linear, 1.4–3.5 mm (0.055–0.138 in) long and 0.4–0.6 mm (0.016–0.024 in) wide, on a petiole 0.4–0.6 mm (0.016–0.024 in) long with stipules 0.5–1.3 mm (0.020–0.051 in) long at the base. The edges of the leaves are turned down or rolled under, sometimes concealing the hairy white lower surface. The flowers are usually borne in spike-like clusters of 2 to 5, 7–11 mm (0.28–0.43 in) wide. The flowers are surrounded by 11 to 14 broadly egg-shaped to oblong bracts. The floral tube is 2.5–3.1 mm (0.098–0.122 in) long and densely hairy, the sepals 2–3 mm (0.079–0.118 in) long and densely hairy, and the petals 1.3–1.6 mm (0.051–0.063 in) long. Flowering occurs from July to September, followed by fruit that is partly hidden inside the floral tube.

== Taxonomy and naming ==
Cryptandra imbricata was first formally described in 2007 by Barbara Lynette Rye in the journal Nuytsia from specimens collected by Alison Marjorie Ashby north of Mullewa in 1969. The specific epithet (imbricata ) means "overlapping", referring to the bracts at the base of the flowers.

== Distribution and habitat ==
This cryptandra mainly grows on red sandy clay in the Avon Wheatbelt, Murchison and Yalgoo bioregions of south-western Western Australia.

== Conservation status ==
This cryptandra is listed as "not threatened" by the Western Australian Government Department of Biodiversity, Conservation and Attractions.
