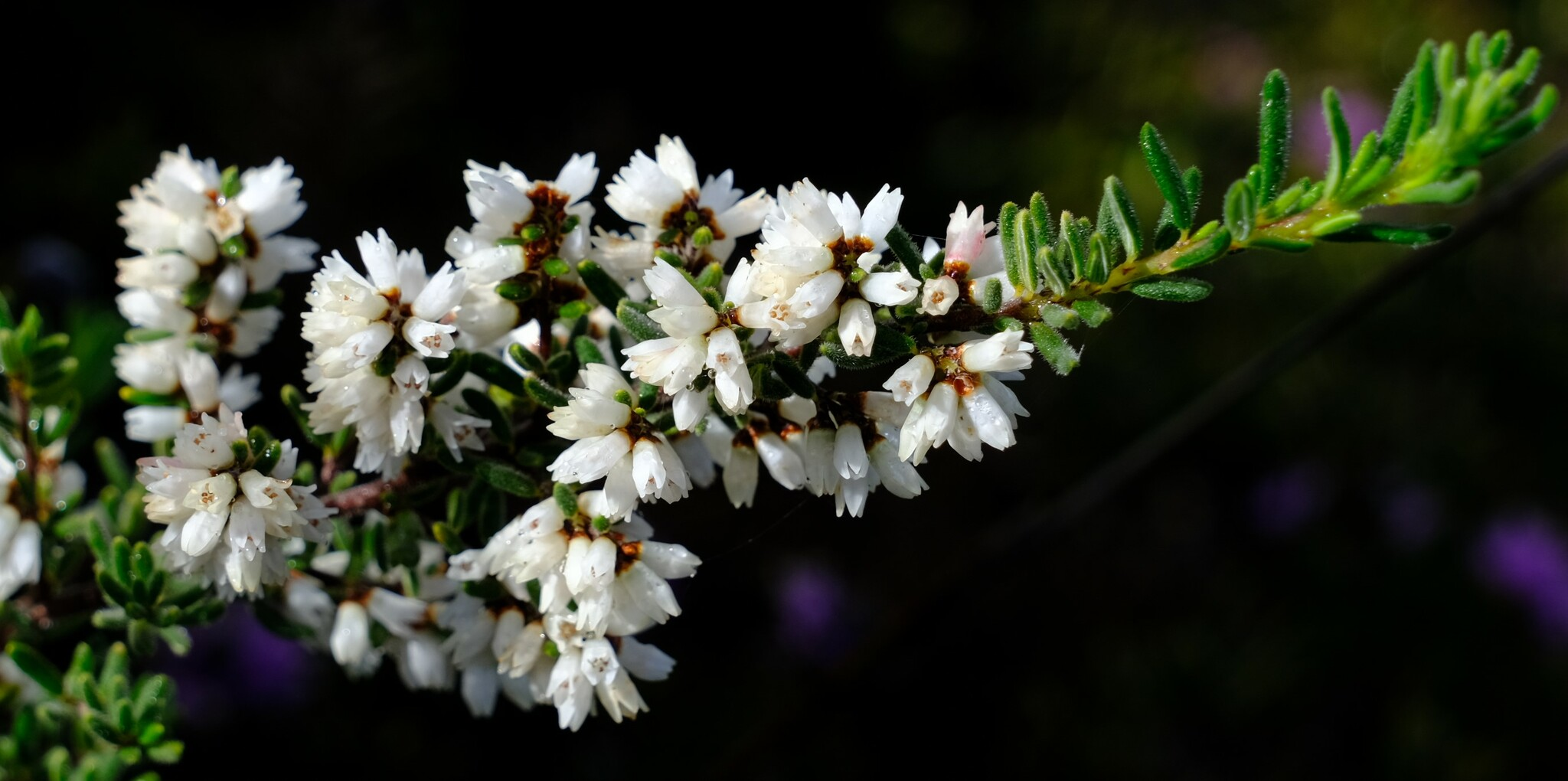

Scientific classification
- Kingdom: Plantae
- Clade: Tracheophytes
- Clade: Angiosperms
- Clade: Eudicots
- Clade: Rosids
- Order: Rosales
- Family: Rhamnaceae
- Genus: Cryptandra
- Species: C. intermedia

Binomial name
- Cryptandra intermedia Rye Rye

= Cryptandra intermedia =

Species of flowering plant

Cryptandra intermedia is a species of flowering plant in the family Rhamnaceae and is endemic to the southwest of Western Australia. It is a small shrub, usually with spiny branchlets, elliptic to linear leaves and spike-like clusters of white, tube-shaped flowers.

== Description ==
Cryptandra intermedia is a shrub that typically grows to a height of 20–70 cm (7.9–27.6 in) and usually has spiny branchlets. The leaves are elliptic to linear in outline, 3–9 mm (0.12–0.35 in) long and 0.6–2 mm (0.024–0.079 in) wide, on a petiole 0.4–1.2 mm (0.016–0.047 in) long with stipules 0.8–1.4 mm (0.031–0.055 in) long and a small sharp point on the tip. The upper surface of the leaves is glabrous, the edges turned down or rolled under, often concealing the densely hairy lower surface. The flowers are borne in head-like clusters of 2 to 10, surrounded by about 8 broadly egg-shaped to oblong bracts. The floral tube is 1.5–3 mm (0.059–0.118 in) long, the sepals 1.2–1.7 mm (0.047–0.067 in) long and glabrous, and the petals are about 0.8 mm (0.031 in) long.

== Taxonomy and naming ==
This cryptandra was first formally described in 1995 by Barbara Lynette Rye who gave it the name Cryptandra arbutiflora var. intermedia in the journal Nuytsia from specimens collected near the Jurien Bay turnoff from the Brand Highway in 1992. In 2007, Rye raised the variety to species status as Cryptandra intermedia in a later edition of Nuytsia. The specific epithet (intermedia ) means "coming between", referring to the floral morphology of this species in relation to others in the genus.

== Distribution ==
Cryptandra intermedia grows in rocky and undulating places, on slopes and hilltops, in winter-wet sites and along creeks, mostly between Cockleshell Gully, Mount Peron, Gingin and Moora in the Avon Wheatbelt, Esperance Plains, Geraldton Sandplains, Jarrah Forest and Swan Coastal Plain bioregions of south-western Western Australia.

== Conservation status ==
Cryptandra intermedia is listed as "not threatened" by the Western Australian Government Department of Biodiversity, Conservation and Attractions.
