= Cryptandra nutans =

Scientific classification
- Kingdom: Plantae
- Clade: Tracheophytes
- Clade: Angiosperms
- Clade: Eudicots
- Clade: Rosids
- Order: Rosales
- Family: Rhamnaceae
- Genus: Cryptandra
- Species: C. nutans

Binomial name
- Cryptandra nutans Steud.

Species of flowering plant

Cryptandra nutans is a species of flowering plant in the family Rhamnaceae and is endemic to the southwest of Western Australia. It is a shrub that typically grows to a height of 10–60 cm (3.9–23.6 in) and has many stems at ground level. Its leaves are up to 4 mm (0.16 in) long, and the flowers are white, pink or cream-coloured and crowded in spikes on the ends of branches. The sepals are joined at the base to form a broadly bell-shaped tube, less than 2 mm (0.079 in) long with spreading lobes. Flowering occurs in August and September. It was first formally described in 1845 by Ernst Gottlieb von Steudel in Lehmann's Plantae Preissianae from specimens collected in 1840. The specific epithet (nutans) means "nodding".

This cryptandra grows in gravelly sand or clayey soils over laterite in the Avon Wheatbelt, Coolgardie, Esperance Plains, Geraldton Sandplains, Jarrah Forest, Mallee and Swan Coastal Plain bioregions of south-western Western Australia.
