= Cryptandra graniticola =

Scientific classification
- Kingdom: Plantae
- Clade: Tracheophytes
- Clade: Angiosperms
- Clade: Eudicots
- Clade: Rosids
- Order: Rosales
- Family: Rhamnaceae
- Genus: Cryptandra
- Species: C. graniticola

Binomial name
- Cryptandra graniticola Rye

Species of flowering plant

Cryptandra graniticola is a flowering plant in the family Rhamnaceae and is endemic to southern Western Australia. It is an upright, spreading shrub with spiny branchlets, linear to narrowly egg-shaped leaves and clusters of white, tube-shaped flowers.

== Description ==
Cryptandra graniticola is a shrub that typically grows to a height of 0.4–1.5 m (1 ft 4 in – 4 ft 11 in), its branchlets tending to be spiny. The leaves are linear to narrowly egg-shaped with the narrower end towards the base, 2–4.7 mm (0.079–0.185 in) long and 0.3–0.5 mm (0.012–0.020 in) wide, on a petiole 0.3–0.6 mm (0.012–0.024 in) long with stipules 0.5–1 mm (0.020–0.039 in) long at the base. The upper surface of the leaves is glabrous and the edges are rolled under, concealing most of the lower surface. The flowers are white and borne in a spike-like or head-like cluster of 2 to 10, 5–8 mm (0.20–0.31 in) wide with 5 to 8 egg-shaped floral bracts at the base of each flower. The floral tube is 0.8–1.0 mm (0.031–0.039 in) long and joined at the base for 0.4–0.7 mm (0.016–0.028 in). The sepals are 1.1–1.6 mm (0.043–0.063 in) long and more or less glabrous, the style 1.0–1.3 mm (0.039–0.051 in) long. Flowering mainly occurs from July to October.

== Taxonomy and naming ==
Cryptandra graniticola was first formally described in 1995 by Barbara Lynette Rye in the journal Nuytsia from specimens collected near Norseman in 1951 by Robert Royce. The specific epithet (graniticola ) means "granite inhabitant".

== Distribution and habitat ==
This cryptandra grows in shallow sandy soil, often on granite outcrops or hills and is found from Mount Day to near Lake Cowan in the Coolgardie, Esperance Plains, Great Victoria Desert, Mallee and Murchison bioregions of Western Australia.

== Conservation status ==
Cryptandra graniticola is listed as "not threatened" by the Government of Western Australia Department of Biodiversity, Conservation and Attractions.
