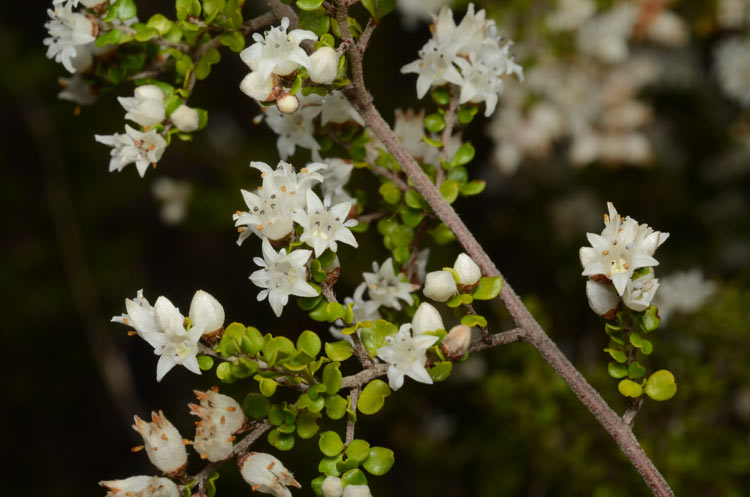
- In Expedition National Park

Scientific classification
- Kingdom: Plantae
- Clade: Tracheophytes
- Clade: Angiosperms
- Clade: Eudicots
- Clade: Rosids
- Order: Rosales
- Family: Rhamnaceae
- Genus: Cryptandra
- Species: C. orbicularis

Binomial name
- Cryptandra orbicularis A.R.Bean

= Cryptandra orbicularis =

Species of flowering plant

Cryptandra orbicularis is a species of flowering plant in the family Rhamnaceae and is endemic to south-eastern Queensland. It is a shrub with more or less round or kidney-shaped leaves and white to creamy-white, tube-shaped flowers.

== Description ==
Cryptandra orbicularis is a shrub that typically grows to a height of 30–90 cm (12–35 in), its branchlets covered with white, star-shaped hairs but not spiny. Its leaves are more or less round, kidney-shaped or sometimes egg-shaped with the narrower end towards the base, 1.3–2.5 mm (0.051–0.098 in) long and 1.3–2.2 mm (0.051–0.087 in) wide. There are narrowly triangular stipules 0.9–1.2 mm (0.035–0.047 in) long and joined to each other at the base of the petiole. Both surfaces of the leaves are more or less glabrous. The flowers are borne singly in leaf axils with several elliptic bracts at the base. The sepals are white to creamy-white, forming a cylindrical to bell-shaped tube 0.9–1.1 mm (0.035–0.043 in) long with spreading lobes 1.3–1.5 mm (0.051–0.059 in) long and hairy. The petals protrude 0.8–1.1 mm (0.031–0.043 in) beyond the sepal tube, and form a hood over the stamens. Flowering has been observed from August to October, and the fruit is a schizocarp.

== Taxonomy and naming ==
Cryptandra orbicularis was first formally described in 2004 by Anthony Bean in the journal Austrobaileya from specimens collected in Expedition National Park in 2000. The specific epithet (orbicularis) refers to the usual shape of the leaves.

== Distribution and habitat ==
This cryptandra grows in shrubby woodland between Cracow and Rolleston in south-eastern Queensland.
