= Cryptandra beverleyensis =

Conservation status
- Priority Three — Poorly Known Taxa (DEC)

Scientific classification
- Kingdom: Plantae
- Clade: Tracheophytes
- Clade: Angiosperms
- Clade: Eudicots
- Clade: Rosids
- Order: Rosales
- Family: Rhamnaceae
- Genus: Cryptandra
- Species: C. beverleyensis

Binomial name
- Cryptandra beverleyensis Rye

Species of flowering plant

Cryptandra beverleyensis is a species of flowering plant in the family Rhamnaceae and is endemic to the southwest of Western Australia. It is a shrub with narrowly oblong leaves and clusters of white, tube-shaped flowers.

== Description ==
Cryptandra beverleyensis is a shrub that typically grows to a height of 0.4–1.3 m (1 ft 4 in – 4 ft 3 in), its branchlets not spiny. Its young stems are densely hairy when young, later becoming glabrous. The leaves are narrowly oblong, 2.5–4.0 mm (0.098–0.157 in) long and 0.4–0.7 mm (0.016–0.028 in) wide on a petiole 0.3–0.5 mm (0.012–0.020 in) long, with stipules 1.2–1.7 mm (0.047–0.067 in) long at the base. The upper surface of the leaves is glabrous and the edges are turned down or rolled under. The flowers are white, and usually borne in groups of 2 to 8 near the ends of branchlets with 12 to 14 bracts, the inner bracts 2.3–3.5 mm (0.091–0.138 in) long. The floral tube is 2.5–3.5 mm (0.098–0.138 in) long, the sepals 2–3 mm (0.079–0.118 in) long and more or less glabrous, the petals 1.3–1.6 mm (0.051–0.063 in) long. Flowering occurs in August and September, and the fruit is about 3 mm (0.12 in) long and hidden in the floral tube.

== Taxonomy and naming ==
Cryptandra beverleyensis was first formally described in 2007 by Barbara Lynette Rye in the journal Nuytsia from specimens collected in 2003. The specific epithet (beverleyensis ) refers to Beverley, where this species has been collected.

== Distribution and habitat ==
This cryptandra grows in woodland between Goomalling, Kellerberrin and Beaufort River in the Avon Wheatbelt and Jarrah Forest bioregions of south-western Western Australia.

== Conservation status ==
Cryptandra beverleyensis is listed as "Priority Three" by the Government of Western Australia Department of Biodiversity, Conservation and Attractions, meaning that it is poorly known and known from only a few locations but is not under imminent threat.
