= Cryptandra micrantha =

Scientific classification
- Kingdom: Plantae
- Clade: Tracheophytes
- Clade: Angiosperms
- Clade: Eudicots
- Clade: Rosids
- Order: Rosales
- Family: Rhamnaceae
- Genus: Cryptandra
- Species: C. micrantha

Binomial name
- Cryptandra micrantha Rye

Species of flowering plant

Cryptandra micrantha is a flowering plant in the family Rhamnaceae and is endemic to the southwest of Western Australia. It is a prostrate or upright shrub with spiny branchlets, narrowly oblong to elliptic leaves and dense clusters of white or cream-coloured, tube-shaped flowers.

== Description ==
Cryptandra micrantha is a rounded, prostrate or erect, spreading shrub that typically grows to a height of 30–60 cm (12–24 in) and has spiny branchlets. The leaves are narrowly oblong to elliptic, 1.3–2.3 mm (0.051–0.091 in) long and 0.0–0.7 mm (0.000–0.028 in) wide, on a glabrous petiole 0.3–0.4 mm (0.012–0.016 in) long with stipules 0.6–1.3 mm (0.024–0.051 in) long at the base. The edges of the leaves are turned down or rolled under, sometimes concealing the lower surface. The flowers are borne in dense, white or cream-coloured clusters 1.5–3 mm (0.059–0.118 in) wide, surrounded by 4 to 6 egg-shaped bracts. The floral tube is 0.8–1.0 mm (0.031–0.039 in) long and glabrous, the sepals 0.6–0.7 mm (0.024–0.028 in) long and glabrous, and the petals are 0.4–0.5 mm (0.016–0.020 in) long. Flowering occurs from April to August.

== Taxonomy and naming ==
Cryptandra micrantha was first formally described in 2007 by Barbara Lynette Rye in the journal Nuytsia from specimens collected near Mount Gibson in 1994. The specific epithet (micrantha ) means "small flower".

== Distribution ==
This cryptandra grows in stony places, often on hills and occurs between Canna, Wongan Hills, Boorabbin and Mount Magnet in the Avon Wheatbelt, Coolgardie, Jarrah Forest, Mallee, Murchison and Yalgoo bioregions of south-western Western Australia.

== Conservation status ==
Cryptandra micrantha is listed as "not threatened" by the Western Australian Government Department of Biodiversity, Conservation and Attractions.
