= Cryptandra campanulata =

Scientific classification
- Kingdom: Plantae
- Clade: Embryophytes
- Clade: Tracheophytes
- Clade: Angiosperms
- Clade: Eudicots
- Clade: Rosids
- Order: Rosales
- Family: Rhamnaceae
- Genus: Cryptandra
- Species: C. campanulata

Binomial name
- Cryptandra campanulata Schltdl.

Species of flowering plant

Cryptandra campanulata is a species of flowering plant in the family Rhamnaceae and is endemic to South Australia. It is a shrub with narrowly elliptic to narrowly egg-shaped or linear leaves and clusters of white, bell-shaped flowers.

== Description ==
Cryptandra campanulata is a shrub that typically grows to a height of 0.3–1 m (1 ft 0 in – 3 ft 3 in), its branchlets hairy at first but soon glabrous. Its leaves are narrowly elliptic, narrowly egg-shaped or linear, mostly 2.3–5.5 mm (0.091–0.217 in) long and 0.3–0.7 mm (0.012–0.028 in) wide on a petiole 0.2–0.7 mm (0.0079–0.0276 in) long, with stipules 1.0–1.9 mm (0.039–0.075 in) long at the base. The upper surface of the leaves is glabrous and the edges are turned down or rolled under, obscuring the lower surface. The flowers are white and borne singly in up to 20 leaf axils near the ends of branchlets, each flower with 6 to 8 bracts at the base. The floral tube is 2.8–4.3 mm (0.11–0.17 in) long, the sepals 1.4–2.2 mm (0.055–0.087 in) long and covered with both simple and small, star-shaped hairs. The petals are 0.8–1.2 mm (0.031–0.047 in) long, forming a hood over stamens 0.6–1.1 mm (0.024–0.043 in) long. Flowering occurs from May to November, and the fruit is 3.0–4.3 mm (0.12–0.17 in) long.

== Taxonomy and naming ==
Cryptandra campanulata was first formally described in 1847 by Diederich Franz Leonhard von Schlechtendal in the journal Linnaea. The specific epithet (campanulata) means "bell-shaped", and refers to the large tubular flowers.

== Distribution and habitat ==
This cryptandra grows in shallow soil over rocks, mostly in grassland but also heath and shrubland, and occurs in the southern Flinders Ranges and the northern Mount Lofty Ranges.

== Conservation status ==
Cryptandra campanulata is listed as "Rare" in the South Australian National Parks and Wildlife Act 1972.
