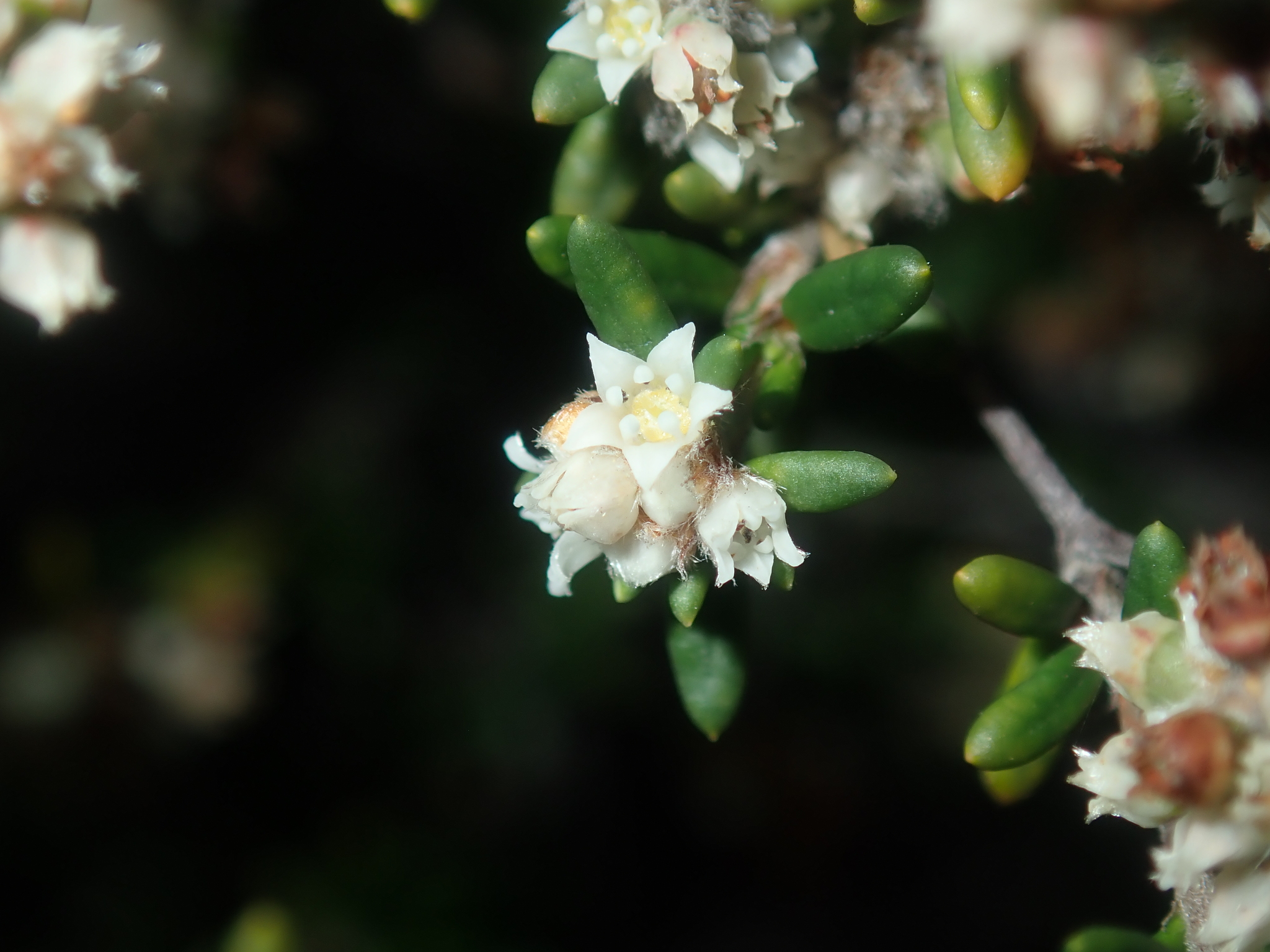
- Near Northampton

Scientific classification
- Kingdom: Plantae
- Clade: Tracheophytes
- Clade: Angiosperms
- Clade: Eudicots
- Clade: Rosids
- Order: Rosales
- Family: Rhamnaceae
- Genus: Cryptandra
- Species: C. spyridioides

Binomial name
- Cryptandra spyridioides F.Muell.

= Cryptandra spyridioides =

Species of flowering plant

Cryptandra spyridioides is a species of flowering plant in the family Rhamnaceae and is endemic to the south-west of Western Australia. It is a shrub that typically grows to a height of 10–80 cm (3.9–31.5 in) and has green and creamy-white to pink flowers from May to August. It was first formally described in 1862 by Ferdinand von Mueller in his Fragmenta Phytographiae Australiae. The specific epithet (spyridioides) means "sweeper", hence "Spyridium-like".

This cryptandra grows in sandy and gravelly soils in the Avon Wheatbelt, Coolgardie, Esperance Plains, Geraldton Sandplains, Jarrah Forest and Mallee bioregions of south-western Western Australia. It is listed as "not threatened" by the Government of Western Australia Department of Biodiversity, Conservation and Attractions.
