= Cryptandra congesta =

Conservation status
- Priority Four — Rare Taxa (DEC)

Scientific classification
- Kingdom: Plantae
- Clade: Tracheophytes
- Clade: Angiosperms
- Clade: Eudicots
- Clade: Rosids
- Order: Rosales
- Family: Rhamnaceae
- Genus: Cryptandra
- Species: C. congesta

Binomial name
- Cryptandra congesta Rye

Species of flowering plant

Cryptandra congesta is a flowering plant in the family Rhamnaceae and is endemic to a restricted area of the south-west of Western Australia. It is a low, spreading shrub with narrowly egg-shaped or narrowly oblong leaves and clusters of white, tube-shaped flowers.

== Description ==
Cryptandra congesta is a spreading shrub that typically grows to a height of 10–30 cm (3.9–11.8 in), its young stems covered with simple hairs. The leaves are narrowly egg-shaped to narrowly elliptic, 2.0–3.3 mm (0.079–0.130 in) long and 0.6–0.9 mm (0.024–0.035 in) wide, on a petiole 0.5–0.7 mm (0.020–0.028 in) long. The upper surface of the leaves is glabrous and there are minute teeth on the edges, especially near the tips. The flowers are borne in groups of 5 to 12 on the ends of short side-shoots in head-like groups 5.0–8.5 mm (0.20–0.33 in) wide. The floral tube is 1.3–1.7 mm (0.051–0.067 in) long and joined at the base for 0.4–0.5 mm (0.016–0.020 in). The sepals are 0.8–1.8 mm (0.031–0.071 in) long and densely hairy near the tip, but otherwise glabrous. Flowering occurs from April to October.

== Taxonomy and naming ==
Cryptandra congesta was first formally described in 1995 by Barbara Lynette Rye and the description was published in the journal Nuytsia. The specific epithet (congesta ) means "crowded", referring to the flowers.

== Distribution and habitat ==
This cryptandra grows on granite, but is only known from a small area north of Denmark in the Jarrah Forest bioregion of south-western Western Australia.

== Conservation status ==
This cryptandra is listed as "Priority Four" by the Government of Western Australia Department of Biodiversity, Conservation and Attractions, meaning that it is rare or near threatened.
