= Cryptandra exilis =

Scientific classification
- Kingdom: Plantae
- Clade: Tracheophytes
- Clade: Angiosperms
- Clade: Eudicots
- Clade: Rosids
- Order: Rosales
- Family: Rhamnaceae
- Genus: Cryptandra
- Species: C. exilis

Binomial name
- Cryptandra exilis D.I.Morris

Species of flowering plant

Cryptandra exilis, commonly known as slender pearlflower, is a species of flowering plant in the family Rhamnaceae and is endemic to Tasmania. It is a small, straggly, low-growing shrub with linear leaves and tube-shaped white or cream-coloured flowers arranged in small groups on the ends of branches.

== Description ==
Cryptandra exilis is a shrub that typically grows to a height of up to 40 cm (16 in) and has slender, low-lying or straggly stems. Its leaves are arranged in small bundles on short side-branches and are linear with the edges rolled under and 2–7 mm (0.079–0.276 in) long. The flowers are usually arranged in groups of 2 to 6 on the ends of the main branches with dark brown bracts at the base, half as long as the sepal tube. The sepals are white or cream-coloured and joined at the base, forming a densely hairy tube more than 2 mm (0.079 in) long with lobes about 1.5 mm (0.059 in) long. The petals form a hood over the stamens and the style is about 2 mm (0.079 in) long. Flowering occurs from September to May, and the fruit is a capsule about 2.5 mm (0.098 in) long.

== Taxonomy ==
Cryptandra exilis was first formally described in 1991 by Dennis Ivor Morris in Aspects of Tasmanian Botany - a tribute to Winifred Curtis from specimens collected by Tony Moscal in 1980. The specific epithet (exilis) means "small" or "weak".

== Distribution and habitat ==
Slender pearlflower grows in heathy or shrubby forest from Cape Barren Island to the Tasman Peninsula on the east coast of Tasmania.
