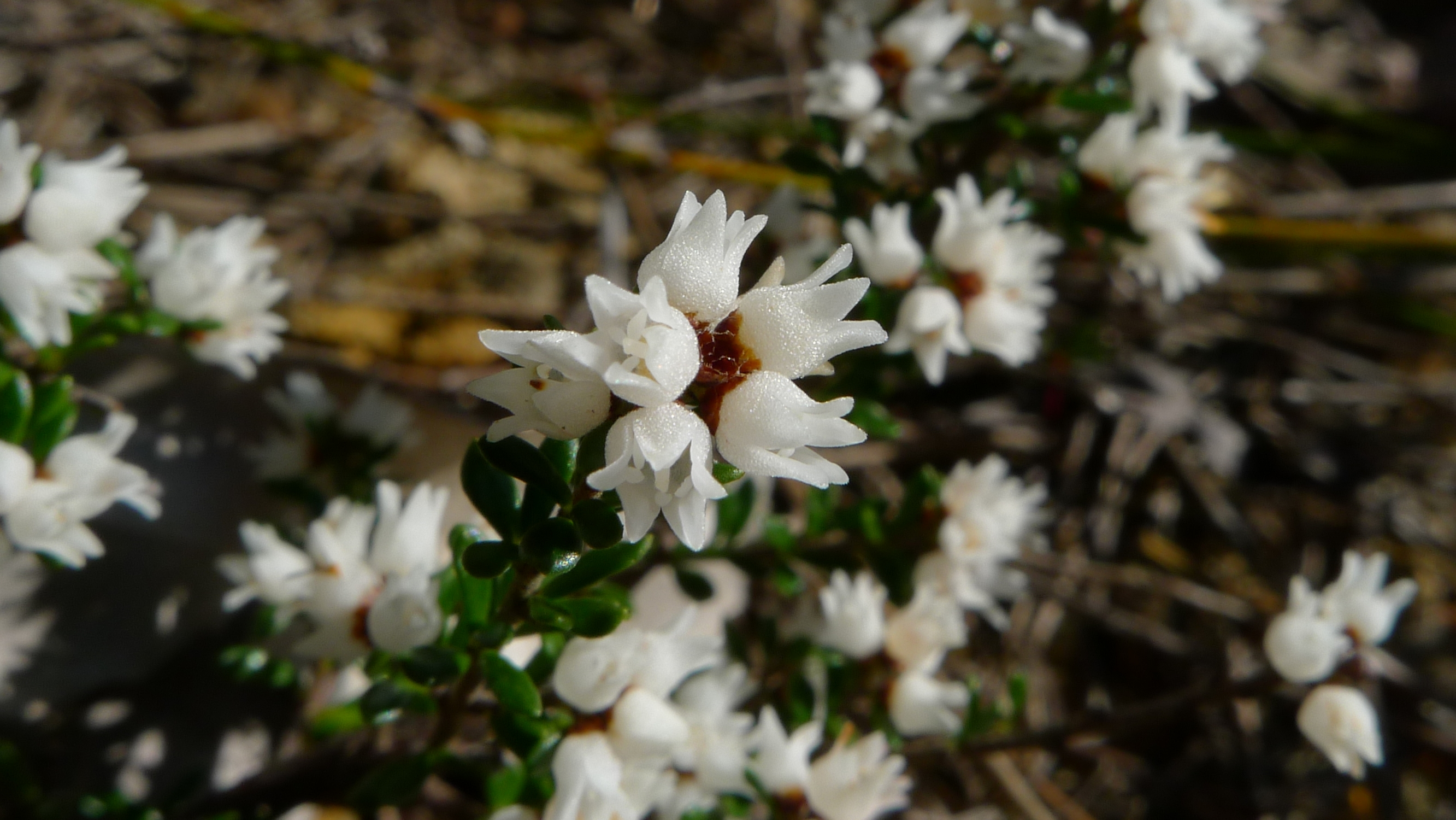
- Cryptandra amara

Scientific classification
- Kingdom: Plantae
- Clade: Tracheophytes
- Clade: Angiosperms
- Clade: Eudicots
- Clade: Rosids
- Order: Rosales
- Family: Rhamnaceae
- Tribe: Pomaderreae
- Genus: Cryptandra; Sm.

Species
- See text

Synonyms
- Cryptandra Sm. sect. Cryptandra; Cryptandra sect. Eucryptandra T.Post & Kuntze nom. inval.; Cryptandra sect. Wichurea Benth.; Cryptandra subg. Corisandra Reissek; Cryptandra Sm. subg. Cryptandra; Cryptandra subg. Eucryptandra Reissek nom. inval.; Wichuraea Nees ex Reissek nom. illeg.

= Cryptandra =

Genus of flowering plants

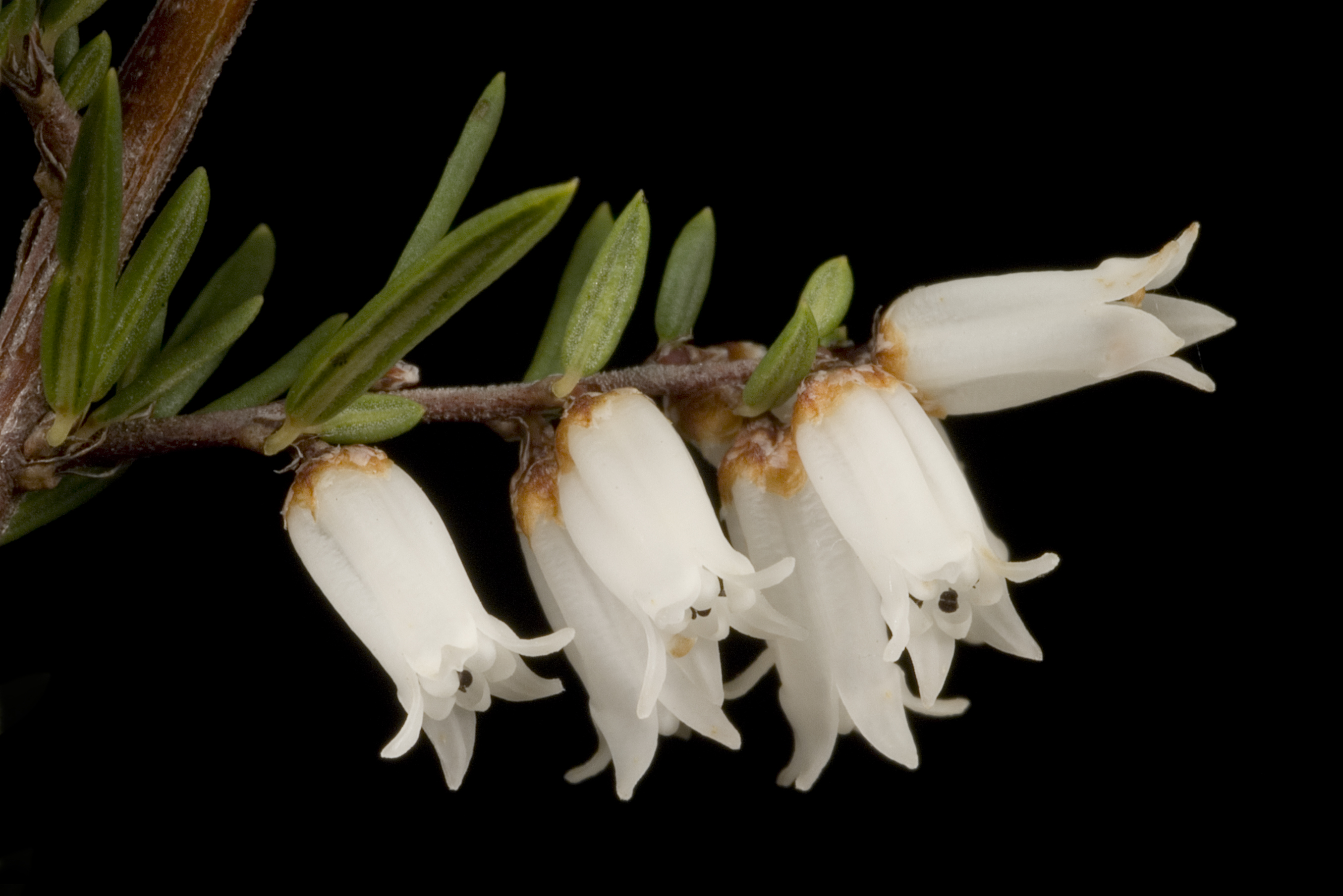
Cryptandra arbutiflora

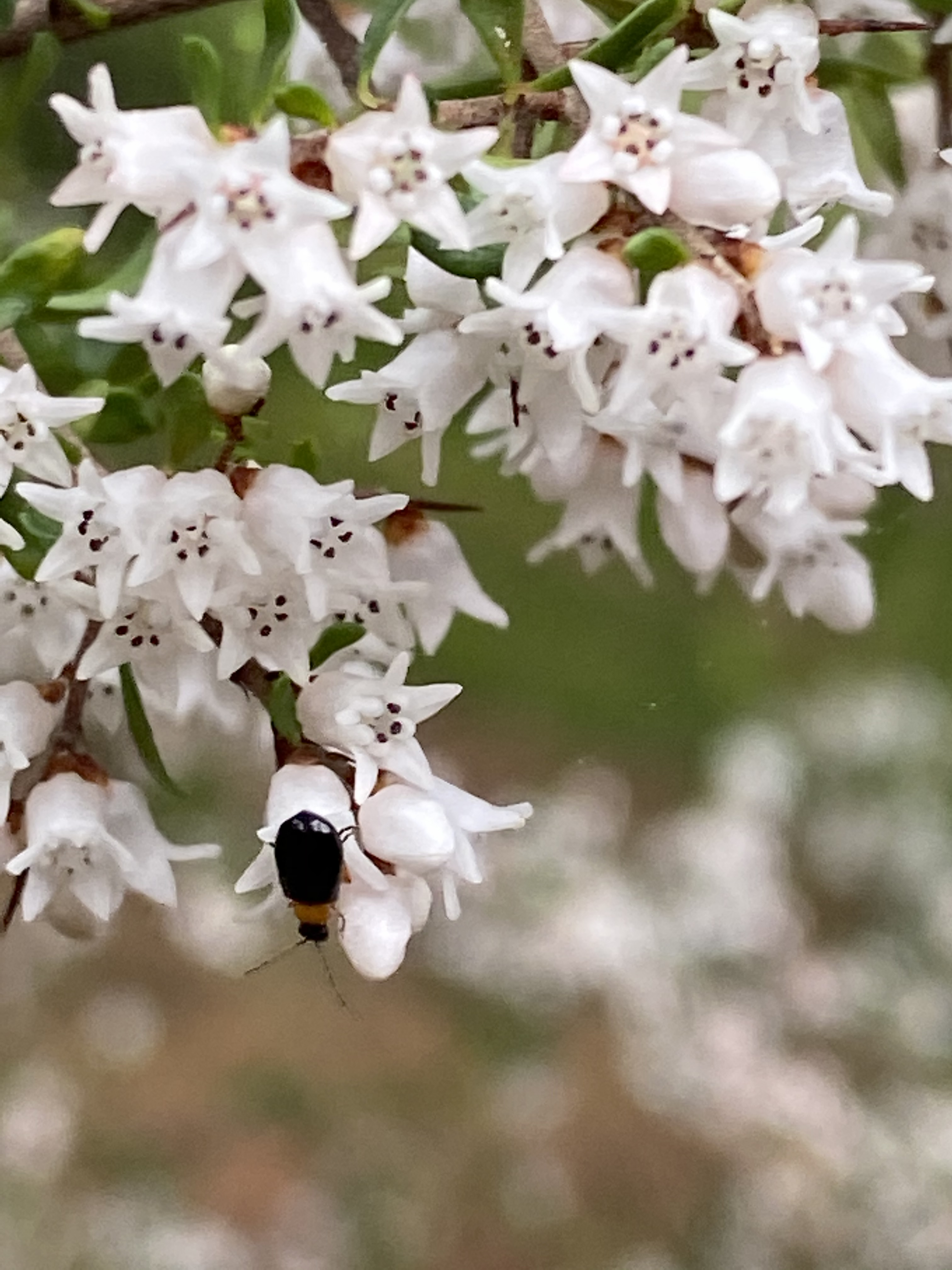
Cryptandra spinescens in the Australian National Botanic Gardens

Cryptandra is a genus of flowering plants in the family Rhamnaceae and is endemic to Australia. Most plants in the genus Cryptandra are spiny, heath-like shrubs with small, clustered leaves and flowers crowded at the ends of branches, the flowers are usually small, surrounded by brown bracts, and with tube-shaped hypanthium, the petals hooded over the anthers.

== Taxonomy ==
The genus Cryptandra was first formally described in 1798 by James Edward Smith in the Transactions of the Linnean Society of London. The genus name means "hidden man", referring to the stamens.

== List of species ==
The following is a list of species of Cryptandra accepted by the Australian Plant Census as at August 2022:

- Cryptandra alpina Hook.f. (Tas.)
- Cryptandra amara Sm. (Qld., N.S.W., A.C.T., Vic., Tas.)
- Cryptandra apetala Ewart & Jean White (W.A.)
  - Cryptandra apetala var. anomala Rye
  - Cryptandra apetala Ewart & Jean White var. apetala Rye
- Cryptandra arbutiflora Fenzl (W.A.)
  - Cryptandra arbutiflora Fenzlvar. arbutiflora Rye
  - Cryptandra arbutiflora var. borealis Rye
  - Cryptandra arbutiflora var. pygmaea Rye
  - Cryptandra arbutiflora var. tubulosa (Fenzl) Benth.
- Cryptandra aridicola Rye (W.A.)
- Cryptandra armata C.T.White & W.D.Francis (Qld., N.S.W.)
- Cryptandra beverleyensis Rye (W.A.)
- Cryptandra campanulata Schltdl. (S.A.)
- Cryptandra ciliata A.R.Bean (Qld.)
- Cryptandra congesta Rye (W.A.)
- Cryptandra connata C.A.Gardner (W.A.)
- Cryptandra craigiae Rye (W.A.)
- Cryptandra debilis A.R.Bean (Qld.)
- Cryptandra dielsii C.A.Gardner ex Rye (W.A.)
- Cryptandra distigma Rye (W.A.)
- Cryptandra ericoides Sm. (N.S.W., Vic.)
- Cryptandra exilis D.I.Morris (Tas.)
- Cryptandra exserta Rye (W.A.)
- Cryptandra filiformis A.R.Bean (Qld.)
- Cryptandra gemmata A.R.Bean (N.T.)
- Cryptandra glabriflora Benth. (W.A.)
- Cryptandra graniticola Rye (W.A.)
- Cryptandra hispidula Reissek & F.Muell. (S.A.)
- Cryptandra imbricata Rye (W.A.)
- Cryptandra inconspicua Rye (W.A.)
- Cryptandra intermedia (Rye) Rye (W.A.)
- Cryptandra intonsa Rye (W.A.)
- Cryptandra intratropica W.Fitzg. (W.A.)
- Cryptandra lanosiflora F.Muell. (Qld., N.S.W.)
- Cryptandra leucopogon Meisn. ex Reissek (W.A.)
- Cryptandra longistaminea F.Muell. (Qld., N.S.W.)
- Cryptandra magniflora F.Muell. (Vic.)
- Cryptandra micrantha Rye (W.A.)
- Cryptandra minutifolia Rye (W.A.)
  - Cryptandra minutifolia subsp. brevistyla Rye
  - Cryptandra minutifolia Rye subsp. minutifolia
- Cryptandra monticola Rye & Trudgen (W.A.)
- Cryptandra multispina Rye (W.A.)
- Cryptandra mutila Nees ex Reissek (W.A.)
- Cryptandra myriantha Diels (W.A.)
- Cryptandra nola Rye (W.A.)
- Cryptandra nutans Steud. (W.A.)
- Cryptandra orbicularis A.R.Bean (Qld.)
- Cryptandra pendula Rye (W.A.)
- Cryptandra pogonoloba A.R.Bean (Qld.)
  - Cryptandra pogonoloba A.R.Bean subsp. pogonoloba
  - Cryptandra pogonoloba subsp. septentrionalis Kellerman
- Cryptandra polyclada Diels (W.A.)
  - Cryptandra polyclada subsp. aequabilis Rye
  - Cryptandra polyclada Diels subsp. polyclada
- Cryptandra propinqua A.Cunn. ex Fenzl (S.A., Qld., N.S.W.)
  - Cryptandra propinqua subsp. maranoa Kellermann & Udovicic
  - Cryptandra propinqua A.Cunn. ex Fenzl subsp. propinqua
- Cryptandra pungens Steud. (W.A.)
- Cryptandra recurva Rye (W.A.)
- Cryptandra scoparia Reissek (W.A.)
- Cryptandra speciosa A.Cunn. ex Kellermann & Udovicic (N.S.W., A.C.T., Vic.)
  - Cryptandra speciosa A.Cunn. ex Kellermann & Udovicic subsp. speciosa
  - Cryptandra speciosa subsp. strigosa Kellermann & Udovicic
- Cryptandra spinescens Sieber ex DC. (N.S.W.)
- Cryptandra spyridioides F.Muell. (W.A.)
- Cryptandra stellulata Rye (W.A.)
- Cryptandra tomentosa Lindl. (S.A., Vic.)
- Cryptandra triplex K.R.Thiele ex Kellerman (N.T.)
- Cryptandra wilsonii Rye (W.A.)
