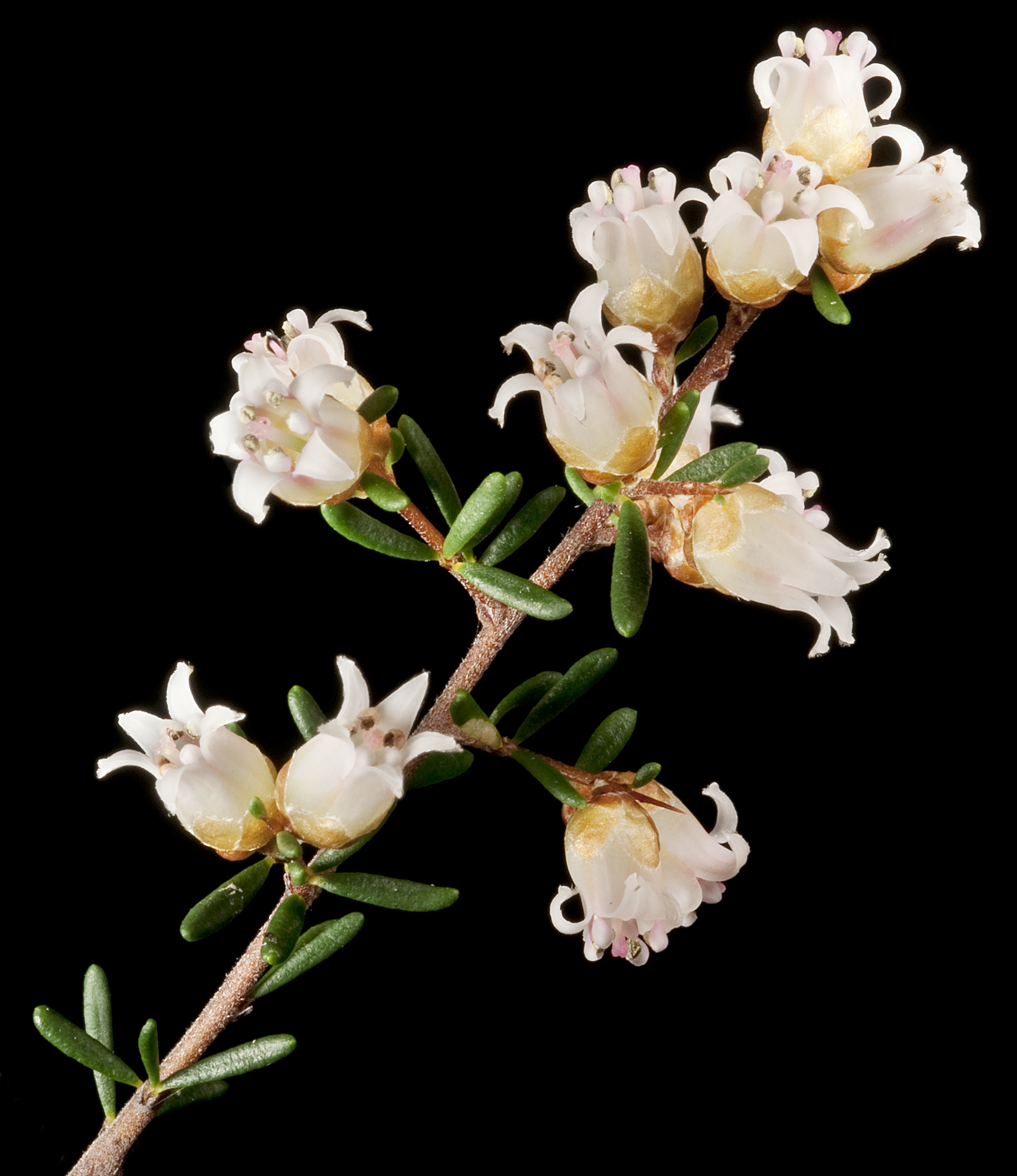

Scientific classification
- Kingdom: Plantae
- Clade: Tracheophytes
- Clade: Angiosperms
- Clade: Eudicots
- Clade: Rosids
- Order: Rosales
- Family: Rhamnaceae
- Genus: Cryptandra
- Species: C. connata

Binomial name
- Cryptandra connata C.A.Gardner

= Cryptandra connata =

Species of flowering plant

Cryptandra connata is a species of flowering plant in the family Rhamnaceae and is endemic to inland Western Australia. It is an erect, prickly shrub with linear to lance-shaped leaves and clusters of white, pink or purple, tube-shaped flowers.

== Description ==
Cryptandra connata is a dense, erect, prickly shrub that typically grows to 0.6–1 m (2 ft 0 in – 3 ft 3 in) high and up to 3 m (9.8 ft) wide, its short side-branches ending in a sharp point. The leaves are variable in size and shape, mostly small and linear to lance-shaped with the edges rolled under. The flowers are glabrous, white, pink or purple, and more or less sessile. The floral tube has 5 to 16 overlapping bracts at the base and the sepals are hairy near their tips. Flowering occurs from May to August and the fruit is 6–7 mm (0.24–0.28 in) long and prominently beaked.

== Taxonomy and naming ==
Cryptandra connata was first formally described in 1929 by Charles Gardner and the description was published in the Journal of the Royal Society of Western Australia. The specific epithet (connata) means "joined together", referring to the sepal lobes.

== Distribution and habitat ==
This cryptandra grows on sandplains in the Coolgardie and Murchison bioregions of inland Western Australia.

== Conservation status ==
This cryptandra is listed as "not threatened" by the Government of Western Australia Department of Biodiversity, Conservation and Attractions.
