= Cryptandra filiformis =

Scientific classification
- Kingdom: Plantae
- Clade: Tracheophytes
- Clade: Angiosperms
- Clade: Eudicots
- Clade: Rosids
- Order: Rosales
- Family: Rhamnaceae
- Genus: Cryptandra
- Species: C. filiformis

Binomial name
- Cryptandra filiformis A.R.Bean

Species of flowering plant

Cryptandra filiformis is a species of flowering plant in the family Rhamnaceae and is endemic to north Queensland. It is a shrub with narrowly elliptic to narrowly lance-shaped leaves and white to creamy-white, tube-shaped flowers.

== Description ==
Cryptandra filiformis is a shrub that typically grows to a height of 50–70 cm (20–28 in), its branchlets covered with star-shaped hairs. Its leaves are narrowly elliptic to narrowly lance-shaped but not clustered, 7.5–30 mm (0.30–1.18 in) long and 0.9–3.5 mm (0.035–0.138 in) wide on a petiole 0.5–0.8 mm (0.020–0.031 in) long, with thread-like stipules 2.8–4.4 mm (0.11–0.17 in) long at the base. Both surfaces of the leaves are covered with star-shaped hairs and the edges of the leaves are turned down or rolled under. The flowers are borne in groups of two to eleven and lack bracts. The sepals are white to creamy-white, forming a cylindrical to urn-shaped tube 1.0–1.3 mm (0.039–0.051 in) long with lobes 1.1–1.3 mm (0.043–0.051 in) long and covered with star-shaped hairs. The petals protrude 0.4–0.5 mm (0.016–0.020 in) beyond the sepal tube, and form a hood over the stamens. Flowering has been observed in April, and the fruit is a schizocarp 3.0–3.8 mm (0.12–0.15 in) long.

== Taxonomy and naming ==
Cryptandra filiformis was first formally described in 2004 by Anthony Bean in the journal Austrobaileya from specimens collected near the road between Mount Carbine and Maytown in 2002. The specific epithet (filiformis) means "thread-like", referring to the stipules.

== Distribution and habitat ==
This cryptandra grows on ridges and plateaux in two disjunct areas about 250 km (160 mi) apart in the Cook district of north Queensland.
