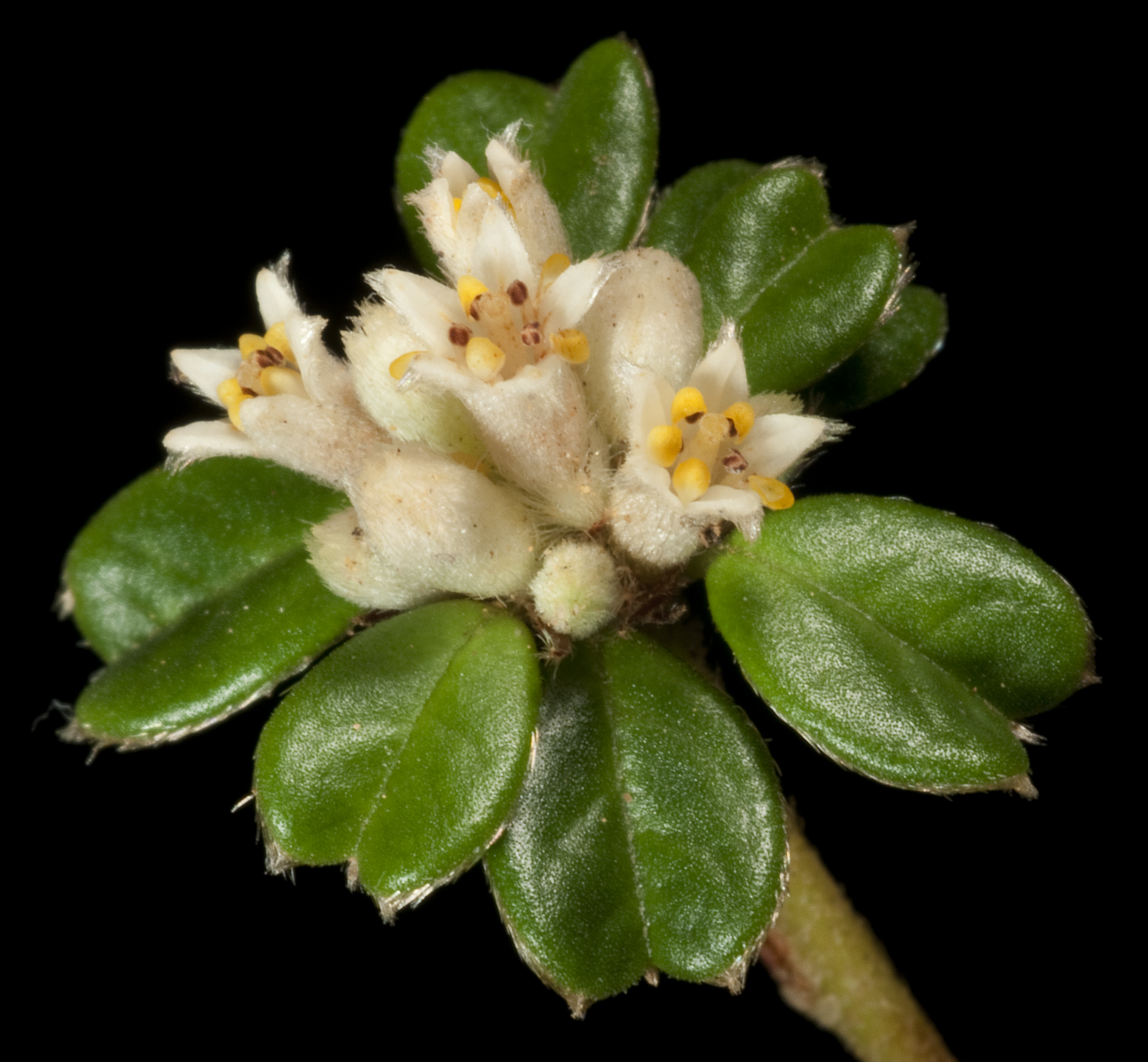
- Stenanthemum nanum

Scientific classification
- Kingdom: Plantae
- Clade: Tracheophytes
- Clade: Angiosperms
- Clade: Eudicots
- Clade: Rosids
- Order: Rosales
- Family: Rhamnaceae
- Genus: Stenanthemum; Reissek

Species
- See text

Synonyms
- Cryptandra sect. Solenandra (Reissek) T.Post & Kuntze p.p.; Cryptandra sect. Stenanthemum (Reissek) Suess.; Cryptandra sect. Stenocodon Hook.f.; Cryptandra subg. Solenandra Reissek p.p.; Solenandra (Reissek) Kuntze nom. illeg. p.p.; Spyridium sect. Stenanthemum (Reissek) F.Muell.

= Stenanthemum =

Genus of flowering plants

Stenanthemum is a genus of flowering plants family Rhamnaceae and is endemic to Australia. Plants in the genus Stenanthemum are small shrubs usually lacking spines. The leaves are arranged alternately along the branches, simple, usually folded in half lengthwise on a short petiole. The flowers are arranged in dense heads, usually on the ends of branches with bracts at the base of the flowers, and there are sometimes whitish floral leaves. The flowers are bisexual, more or less sessile and have five sepals, five petals and a tube-shaped hypanthium, the petals hooded over the stamens. The fruit is a schizocarp containing spotted or mottled seeds.

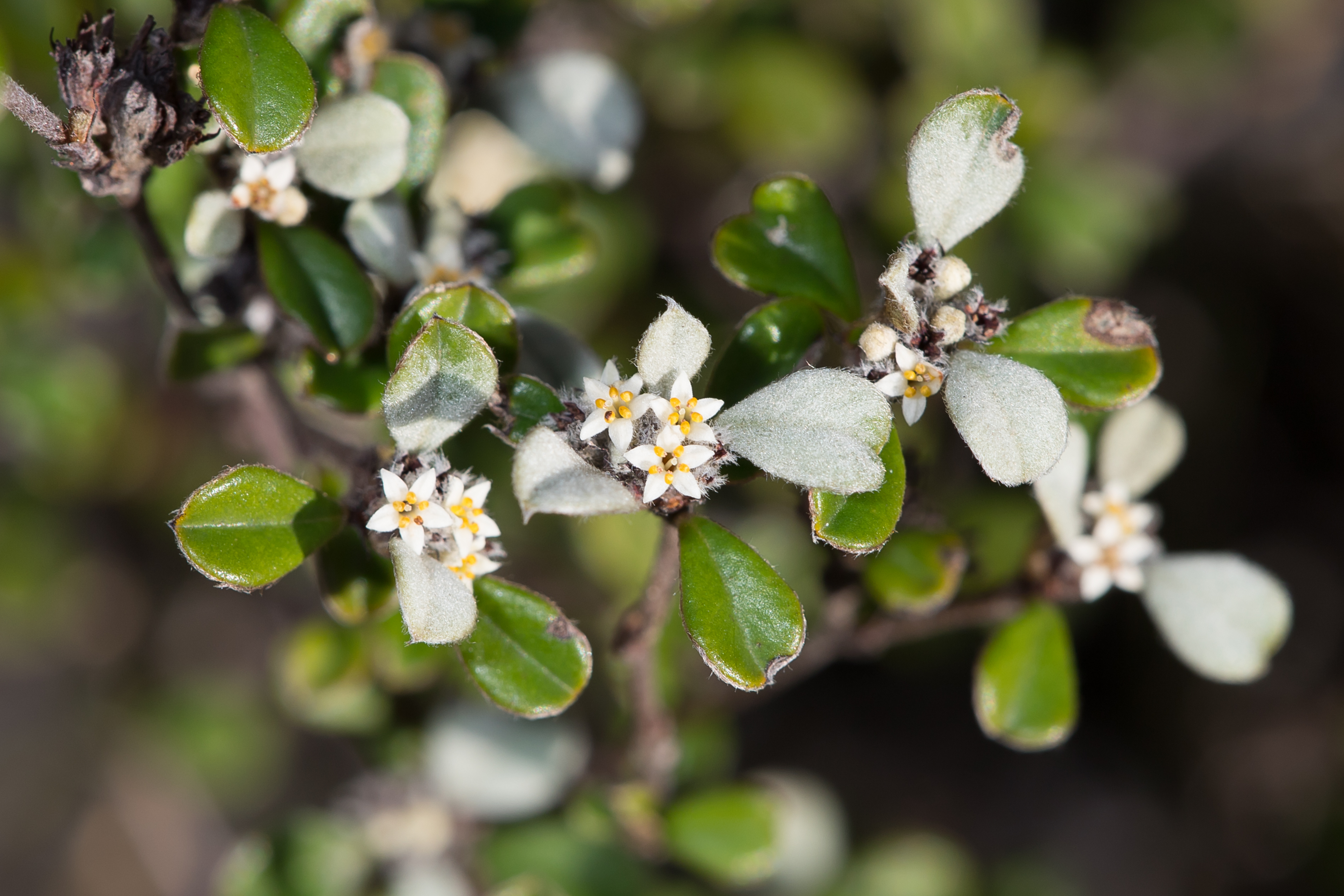
Stenanthemum leucophractum in Cox Scrub Conservation Park

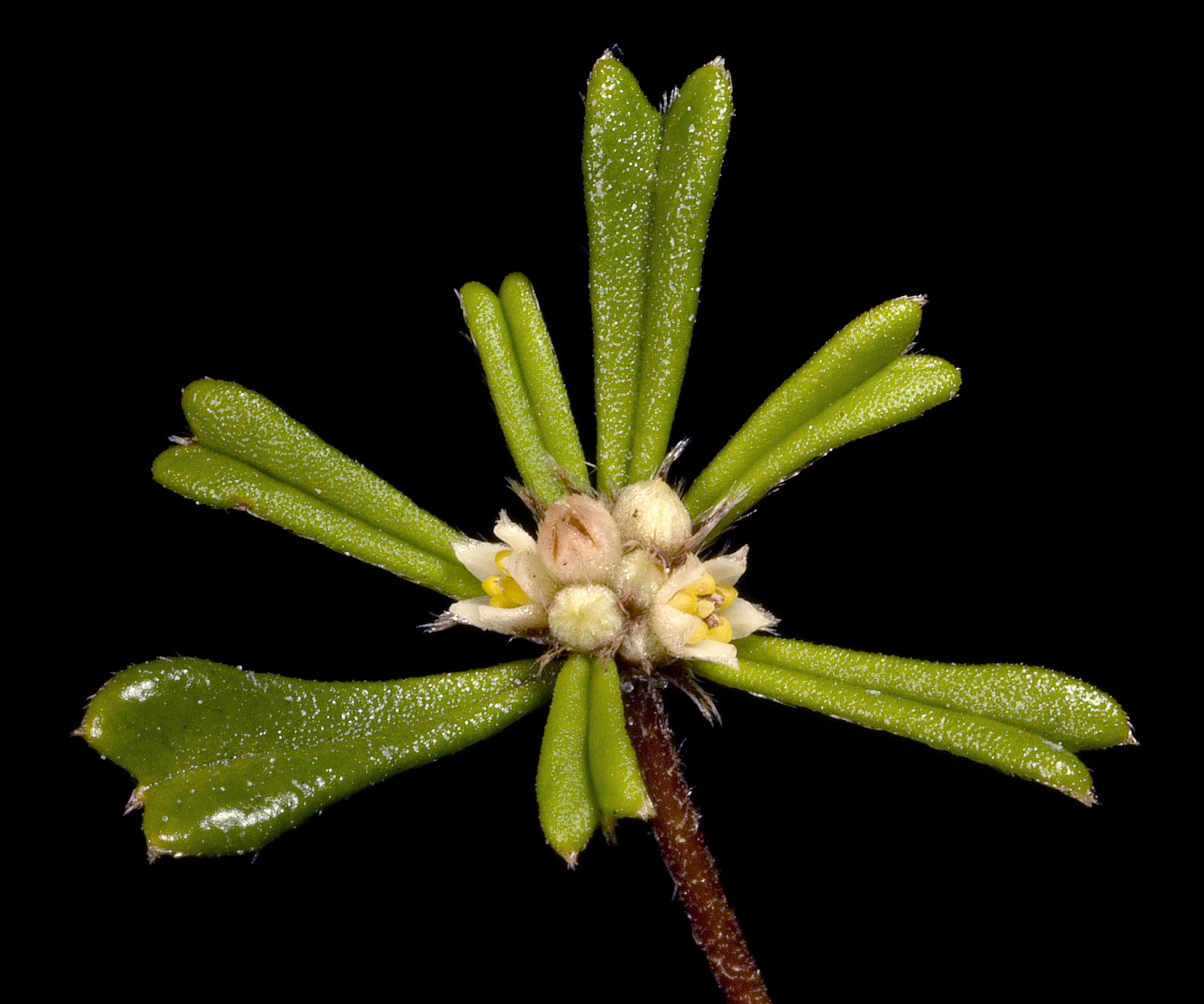
Stenanthemum emarginatum

== Taxonomy ==
The genus Stenanthemum was first formally described in 1858 by Siegfried Reissek in the journal Linnaea. The genus name means "narrow flower".

== List of species ==
The following is a list of species of Stenanthemum accepted by the Australian Plant Census as at November 2022:

- Stenanthemum arens K.R.Thiele (S.A.)
- Stenanthemum argenteum A.R.Bean (Qld.)
- Stenanthemum bilobum Rye (W.A.) (extinct)
- Stenanthemum bremerense Rye (W.A.)
- Stenanthemum centrale K.R.Thiele (N.T.)
- Stenanthemum complicatum (F.Muell.) Rye (W.A.)
- Stenanthemum coronatum (Reissek) Reissek (W.A.)
- Stenanthemum cristatum Rye (W.A.) (presumed extinct)
- Stenanthemum divaricatum (Benth.) Rye (W.A.)
- Stenanthemum emarginatum Rye (W.A.)
- Stenanthemum humile Benth. (W.A.)
- Stenanthemum intricatum Rye (W.A.)
- Stenanthemum leucophractum (Schltdl.) Reissek – rusty poison, white cryptandra, white stenanthemum(S.A., N.S.W., Vic.)
- Stenanthemum liberum Rye (W.A.)
- Stenanthemum limitatum Rye (W.A.)
- Stenanthemum mediale Rye (W.A.)
- Stenanthemum nanum Rye (W.A.)
- Stenanthemum newbeyi Rye (W.A.)
- Stenanthemum notiale Rye (W.A., S.A., Vic.)
- Stenanthemum patens Rye (W.A.)
- Stenanthemum petraeum Rye (W.A., N.T.)
- Stenanthemum pimeleoides (Hook.f.) Benth. – spreading stenanthemum, propellor plant (Tas.)
- Stenanthemum poicilum Rye (W.A.)
- Stenanthemum pomaderroides (Reissek) Reissek (W.A.)
- Stenanthemum pumilum (F.Muell.) Diels (W.A.)
- Stenanthemum radiatum Rye (W.A.)
- Stenanthemum reissekii Rye (W.A.)
- Stenanthemum stipulosum Rye (W.A.)
- Stenanthemum sublineare Rye (W.A.)
- Stenanthemum tridentatum (Steud.) Reissek (W.A.)
- Stenanthemum yorkense Rye (W.A.)
