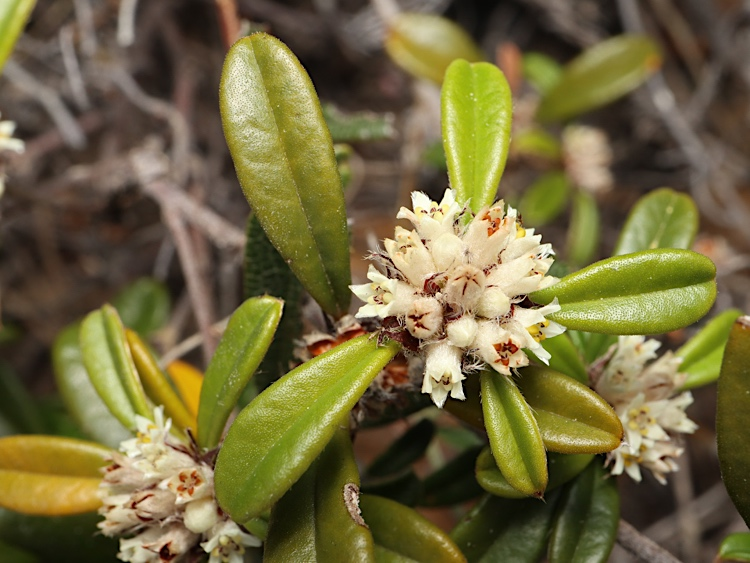
- In Lesueur National Park

Scientific classification
- Kingdom: Plantae
- Clade: Tracheophytes
- Clade: Angiosperms
- Clade: Eudicots
- Clade: Rosids
- Order: Rosales
- Family: Rhamnaceae
- Genus: Stenanthemum
- Species: S. reissekii

Binomial name
- Stenanthemum reissekii Rye

= Stenanthemum reissekii =

Species of flowering plant

Stenanthemum reissekii is a species of flowering plant in the family Rhamnaceae and is endemic to the south-west of Western Australia. It is an erect or low-lying shrub with hairy young stems, egg-shaped or narrowly egg-shaped leaves with the narrower end towards the base, and clusters of densely hairy white or cream-coloured flowers.

== Description ==
Stenanthemum reissekii is an erect or low-lying shrub that typically grows to a height of 10–50 cm (3.9–19.7 in), its young stems densely covered with rust-coloured, star-shaped hairs. The leaves are egg-shaped or narrowly egg-shaped with the narrower end towards the base, 12–24 mm (0.47–0.94 in) long and 4–7 mm (0.16–0.28 in) wide on a petiole 0.5–1.5 mm (0.020–0.059 in) long, with stipules at the base. The edges of the leaves curve downwards, the upper surface covered with minute pimples or glabrous, the lower surface densely covered with long, rust-coloured hairs. The flowers are arranged in clusters 6–13 mm (0.24–0.51 in) wide, surrounded by hairy, egg-shaped bracts about 2.5 mm (0.098 in) long. The floral tube is 2.5–3.0 mm (0.098–0.118 in) long, the sepals 1.3–1.5 mm (0.051–0.059 in) long and densely hairy, and the petals 0.7–0.8 mm (0.028–0.031 in) long. Flowering occurs from August to October, and the fruit is a hairy schizocarp about 2.4 mm (0.094 in) long.

== Taxonomy and naming ==
Stenanthemum reissekii was first formally described in 1995 by Barbara Lynette Rye in the journal Nuytsia from specimens collected by Alex George, north of Badgingarra in 1966. The specific epithet (reissekii) honours Siegfried Reissek.

== Distribution and habitat ==
This species grows on laterite hills between Mount Peron in Lesueur National Park and Badgingarra, in the Geraldton Sandplains bioregion of south-western Western Australia.

== Conservation status ==
Stenanthemum reissekii is listed as "not threatened" by the Government of Western Australia Department of Biodiversity, Conservation and Attractions.
