= Stenanthemum liberum =

Conservation status
- Priority One — Poorly Known Taxa (DEC)

Scientific classification
- Kingdom: Plantae
- Clade: Tracheophytes
- Clade: Angiosperms
- Clade: Eudicots
- Clade: Rosids
- Order: Rosales
- Family: Rhamnaceae
- Genus: Stenanthemum
- Species: S. liberum

Binomial name
- Stenanthemum liberum Rye

Species of flowering plant

Stenanthemum liberum is a species of flowering plant in the family Rhamnaceae and is endemic to the southwest of Western Australia. It is a dwarf or prostrate shrub with densely hairy young stems, elliptic to egg-shaped with the narrower end towards the base, and densely hairy heads of tube-shaped flowers.

== Description ==
Stenanthemum liberum is a dwarf or prostrate shrub that typically grows to a height of up to 5 cm (2.0 in), its young stems densely covered with tangled grey hairs. Its leaves are elliptic to egg-shaped with the narrower end towards the base, 4–5 mm (0.16–0.20 in) long and 2.5–3.5 mm (0.098–0.138 in) wide on a petiole about 1 mm (0.039 in) long, with stipules that are free from each other and 2–3 mm (0.079–0.118 in) long. The edges of the leaves are curved downwards and tips of the leaves have a short, down-curved point. The lower surface of the leaves is densely covered with hairs pressed against the surface. The flowers are arranged in groups of up to 10, densely covered with simple hairs, the floral tube about 1.2 mm (0.047 in) long with lobes 0.7 mm (0.028 in) long, the sepals about 0.9 mm (0.035 in) long. Flowering occurs in August and September, and the fruit is a schizocarp about 2.5 mm (0.098 in) long.

== Taxonomy and naming ==
Stenanthemum liberum was first formally described in 2001 by Barbara Lynette Rye in the journal Nuytsia from specimens collected near South Ironcap in 1996. The specific epithet (liberum) means "free", referring to the stipules.

== Distribution and habitat ==
This species grows in open woodland and is only known from a small are near South Ironcap, east of Hyden in the Coolgardie and Mallee bioregions of south-western Western Australia.

== Conservation status ==
Stenanthemum liberum is listed as "Priority One" by the Government of Western Australia Department of Biodiversity, Conservation and Attractions, meaning that it is known from only one or a few locations which are potentially at risk.
