= Stenanthemum stipulosum =

Scientific classification
- Kingdom: Plantae
- Clade: Tracheophytes
- Clade: Angiosperms
- Clade: Eudicots
- Clade: Rosids
- Order: Rosales
- Family: Rhamnaceae
- Genus: Stenanthemum
- Species: S. stipulosum

Binomial name
- Stenanthemum stipulosum Rye

Species of flowering plant

Stenanthemum stipulosum is a species of flowering plant in the family Rhamnaceae and is endemic to inland Western Australia. It is an erect or low-lying shrub with densely hairy young stems, egg-shaped with the narrower end towards the base, and clusters of 10 to 30 densely hairy white or cream-coloured flowers, sometimes surrounded by whitish floral leaves.

== Description ==
Stenanthemum stipulosum is an erect or low-lying shrub that typically grows to a height of 0.1–1 m (3.9 in – 3 ft 3.4 in), its young stems densely covered with white or rust-coloured, star-shaped and simple hairs. The leaves are egg-shaped with the narrower end towards the base, 3–7 mm (0.12–0.28 in) long and 2–5 mm (0.079–0.197 in) wide on a petiole 1–2 mm (0.039–0.079 in) long, with hairy stipules at the base. The upper surface is covered with minute, star-shaped hairs, the lower surface pale green or rust-coloured. The flowers are arranged in clusters of 10 to 30, 4–8 mm (0.16–0.31 in) wide, surrounded by hairy, egg-shaped bracts 1.3–2 mm (0.051–0.079 in) long and sometimes by whitish floral leaves. The floral tube is 0.8–1.2 mm (0.031–0.047 in) long, the sepals 0.5–0.7 mm (0.020–0.028 in) long and densely hairy, and the petals 0.5–0.6 mm (0.020–0.024 in) long. Flowering occurs throughout the year with a peak from September to November, and the fruit is a more or less glabrous schizocarp 1.8–2.3 mm (0.071–0.091 in) long.

== Taxonomy and naming ==
Stenanthemum stipulosum was first formally described in 1995 by Barbara Lynette Rye in the journal Nuytsia from specimens collected by Charles Gardner, near Boorabbin in 1945. The specific epithet (stipulosum) means "many small stipules".

== Distribution and habitat ==
This species grows in shrubland and mallee woodland on ridges and plains in sandy soil between Kulin, Coolgardie and Menzies, in the Avon Wheatbelt, Coolgardie, Mallee, Murchison and Yalgoo bioregions of inland Western Australia.

== Conservation status ==
Stenanthemum stipulosum is listed as "not threatened" by the Government of Western Australia Department of Biodiversity, Conservation and Attractions.
