= Stenanthemum notiale =

Scientific classification
- Kingdom: Plantae
- Clade: Tracheophytes
- Clade: Angiosperms
- Clade: Eudicots
- Clade: Rosids
- Order: Rosales
- Family: Rhamnaceae
- Genus: Stenanthemum
- Species: S. notiale

Binomial name
- Stenanthemum notiale Rye

Species of flowering plant

Stenanthemum notiale is a species of flowering plant in the family Rhamnaceae and is native to Western Australia, South Australia and Victoria. It is a small, erect to prostrate shrub with hairy young stems, egg-shaped leaves with the narrower end towards the base, and clusters of white to cream-coloured or greenish yellow, densely shaggy-hairy flowers.

== Description ==
Stenanthemum notiale is a variable, erect to prostrate shrub that typically grows to a height of up to 50–60 cm (20–24 in), its young stems covered with soft, greyish or rust-coloured hairs. Its leaves are egg-shaped to broadly egg-shaped with the narrower end towards the base, 3–12 mm (0.12–0.47 in) long and 2–7 mm (0.079–0.276 in) wide on a petiole 0.5–2 mm (0.020–0.079 in) long, with fused, egg-shaped to broadly triangular stipules 0.8–3.5 mm (0.031–0.138 in) long at the base. Both surfaces of the leaves are sometimes covered with soft or shaggy hairs, or otherwise glabrous. The flowers are borne in clusters of 10 to 20 up to 8 mm (0.31 in) wide, the floral tube up to 0.4 mm (0.016 in) long, 0.6–1.2 mm (0.024–0.047 in) wide and densely hairy, the sepals 0.8–1.2 mm (0.031–0.047 in) long and the petals 0.5–0.7 mm (0.020–0.028 in) long. Flowering occurs sporadically throughout the year, and the fruit is a densely hairy schizocarp 1.8–2.4 mm (0.071–0.094 in) long.

== Taxonomy and naming ==
Stenanthemum notiale was first formally described in 1995 by Barbara Lynette Rye in the journal Nuytsia from specimens collected by Eric Jackson near the Young River crossing on the Ravensthorpe - Esperance road in 1968. The specific epithet (notiale) means "southern", referring to the species' distribution in three southern Australian states.

In the same journal, Rye described two subspecies of S. notiale and the names are accepted by the Australian Plant Census:

- Stenanthemum notiale subsp. chamelum Rye forms a ground cover, its leaves with up to 3 teeth near the tip, the upper surface minutely pimply or with sparse, minute hairs.
- Stenanthemum notiale Rye subsp. notiale Rye has a more erect habit, its leaves with a rounded tip, the upper surface always hairy.

== Distribution and habitat ==
Subspecies chamelum grows in heath and shrubland, usually over limestone, and is found on the coastal plain between Lancelin and Perth in the Geraldton Sandplains and Swan Coastal Plain bioregions of south-western Western Australia. Subspecies notiale grows in woodland, heath and mallee and is widely distributed between Geraldton and Israelite Bay in Western Australia, and on the Eyre Peninsula in South Australia. There are also a few records from near Hattah and in the Wyperfeld National Park in north-western Victoria.

== Conservation status ==
Stenanthemum notiale and both subspecies of S. notiale are listed as "not threatened" in Western Australia, by the Government of Western Australia Department of Biodiversity, Conservation and Attractions. Subspecies notiale is classified as "endangered" under the Victorian Government Flora and Fauna Guarantee Act 1988.
