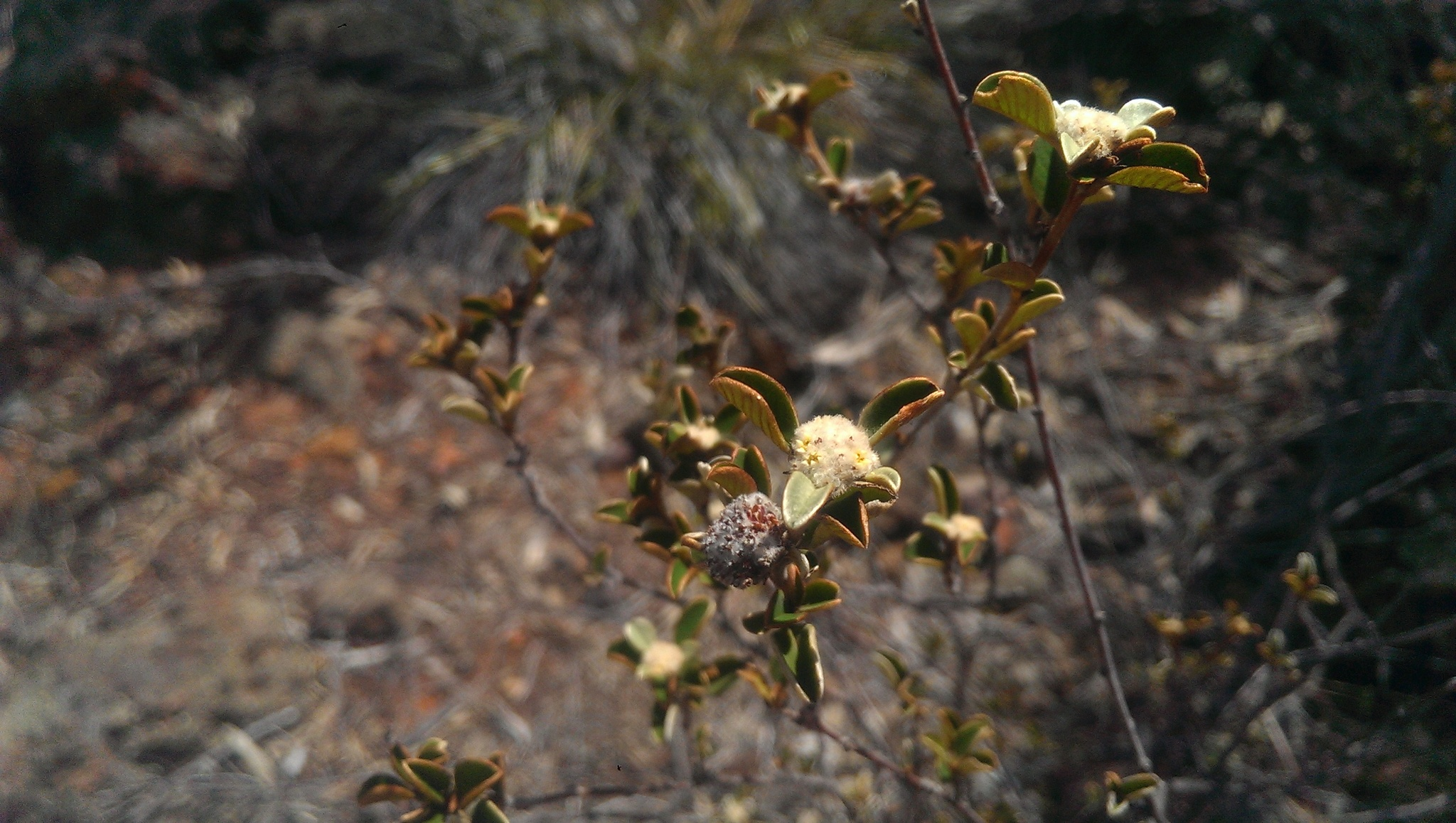

Scientific classification
- Kingdom: Plantae
- Clade: Tracheophytes
- Clade: Angiosperms
- Clade: Eudicots
- Clade: Rosids
- Order: Rosales
- Family: Rhamnaceae
- Genus: Stenanthemum
- Species: S. newbeyi

Binomial name
- Stenanthemum newbeyi Rye

= Stenanthemum newbeyi =

Species of flowering plant

Stenanthemum newbeyi is a species of flowering plant in the family Rhamnaceae and is endemic to a restricted area in the south of Western Australia. It is an erect or spreading shrub with hairy young stems, egg-shaped leaves with the narrower end towards the base, and clusters of rust-coloured, densely shaggy-hairy flowers, surrounded by whitish floral leaves.

== Description ==
Stenanthemum newbeyi is an erect or spreading shrub that typically grows to a height of up to 1.0–1.5 m (3 ft 3 in – 4 ft 11 in), its young stems densely covered with soft, rust-coloured hairs. Its leaves are broadly egg-shaped to egg-shaped with the narrower end towards the base, 10–15 mm (0.39–0.59 in) long and 6–8 mm (0.24–0.31 in) wide on a petiole 1–3 mm (0.039–0.118 in) long, with triangular stipules 3–5 mm (0.12–0.20 in) long at the base. The upper surface of the leaf is velvety-hairy and the lower surface is densely covered with shaggy, rust-coloured hairs. The flowers are densely shaggy-hairy and arranged in clusters of 5 to 15 up to 10 mm (0.39 in) wide, surrounded by whitish floral leaves. The floral tube is 0.6–0.8 mm (0.024–0.031 in) long, the sepals about 0.9 mm (0.035 in) long and the petals about 0.6 mm (0.024 in) long. Flowering occurs in September, and the fruit is a hairy schizocarp 2.6–3.0 mm (0.10–0.12 in) long.

== Taxonomy and naming ==
Stenanthemum newbeyi was first formally described in 1995 by Barbara Lynette Rye in the journal Nuytsia from specimens collected on Bungalbin Hill in 1989. The specific epithet (newbeyi) honours Kenneth Newbey.

== Distribution and habitat ==
This species grows on rocky hills and is only known from the type location and nearby hills in the Coolgardie bioregion of southern Western Australia.

== Conservation status ==
Stenanthemum newbeyi is listed as "Priority Three" by the Government of Western Australia Department of Biodiversity, Conservation and Attractions, meaning that it is poorly known and known from only a few locations but is not under imminent threat.
