= Stenanthemum petraeum =

Scientific classification
- Kingdom: Plantae
- Clade: Tracheophytes
- Clade: Angiosperms
- Clade: Eudicots
- Clade: Rosids
- Order: Rosales
- Family: Rhamnaceae
- Genus: Stenanthemum
- Species: S. petraeum

Binomial name
- Stenanthemum petraeum Rye

Species of flowering plant

Stenanthemum petraeum is a species of flowering plant in the family Rhamnaceae and is native to inland Western Australia and the Northern Territory. It is a woody, erect shrub with densely hairy young stems, broadly egg-shaped to more or less round leaves, and clusters of white, densely shaggy- to woolly-hairy flowers.

== Description ==
Stenanthemum petraeum is an erect, woody shrub that typically grows to a height of up to 1.5 m (4 ft 11 in), its young densely covered with soft, greyish hairs. Its leaves are broadly egg-shaped with the narrower end towards the base to almost round, 8–15 mm (0.31–0.59 in) long and 8–10 mm (0.31–0.39 in) wide on a petiole 1.0–2.5 mm (0.039–0.098 in) long, with fused, triangular stipules 2–3 mm (0.079–0.118 in) long at the base. The edges of the leaves curve downwards, the upper surface is glabrous and the lower surface is covered with shaggy silvery hairs. The flowers are borne in clusters of 15 to 50 up to 10 mm (0.39 in) wide, the floral tube 1.0–1.5 mm (0.039–0.059 in) long, 1–2 mm (0.039–0.079 in) wide, the sepals 1.0–1.8 mm (0.039–0.071 in) long and the petals 0.8–1.1 mm (0.031–0.043 in) long. Flowering occurs sporadically throughout the year, and the fruit is a schizocarp 2–3 mm (0.079–0.118 in) long.

== Taxonomy and naming ==
Stenanthemum petraeum was first formally described in 1995 by Barbara Lynette Rye in the journal Nuytsia from specimens collected by Alex George near Neale Junction in 1974. The specific epithet (petraeum) means "among rocks", referring to the habitat of this species.

== Distribution and habitat ==
This species of stenanthemum usually grows on stony slopes with Triodia species and is found between Mount Augustus and Laverton in Western Australia and Glen Edith in the Northern Territory.

== Conservation status ==
Stenanthemum petraeum is listed as "not threatened" in Western Australia, by the Government of Western Australia Department of Biodiversity, Conservation and Attractions, but as "near threatened" under the Northern Territory Government Territory Parks and Wildlife Conservation Act.
