= Stenanthemum poicilum =

Conservation status
- Priority Three — Poorly Known Taxa (DEC)

Scientific classification
- Kingdom: Plantae
- Clade: Tracheophytes
- Clade: Angiosperms
- Clade: Eudicots
- Clade: Rosids
- Order: Rosales
- Family: Rhamnaceae
- Genus: Stenanthemum
- Species: S. poicilum

Binomial name
- Stenanthemum poicilum Rye

Species of flowering plant

Stenanthemum poicilum is a species of flowering plant in the family Rhamnaceae and is endemic to the south-west of Western Australia. It is an erect or low-lying shrub with hairy young stems, broadly egg-shaped leaves with the narrower end towards the base, and clusters of densely hairy white flowers.

== Description ==
Stenanthemum poicilum is a twiggy, erect or low-lying shrub that typically grows to a height of 15–50 cm (5.9–19.7 in), its young stems hairy. The leaves are broadly egg-shaped with the narrower end towards the base, 2.5–7 mm (0.098–0.276 in) long and 2.5–6 mm (0.098–0.236 in) wide on a petiole 0.5–1 mm (0.020–0.039 in) long, with stipules at the base. Both surfaces of the leaves are covered with tiny, star-shaped hairs. The flowers are arranged in clusters 5–12 mm (0.20–0.47 in) wide, surrounded by hairy, egg-shaped bracts about 3 mm (0.12 in) long. The floral tube is 2.5–3.7 mm (0.098–0.146 in) long, the sepals 1.3–1.6 mm (0.051–0.063 in) long and densely hairy, and the petals 0.7–1 mm (0.028–0.039 in) long. Flowering occurs in September and October, and the fruit is a hairy schizocarp 2.0–2.5 mm (0.079–0.098 in) long.

== Taxonomy and naming ==
Stenanthemum poicilum was first formally described in 1995 by Barbara Lynette Rye in the journal Nuytsia from specimens collected in 1992. The specific epithet (poicilum) means "mottled", referring to the seeds.

== Distribution and habitat ==
This species grows in heath and shrubland near Canna and on the Bremer Range in the Avon Wheatbelt and Yalgoo bioregions of south-western Western Australia.

== Conservation status ==
Stenanthemum poicilum is listed as "Priority Three" by the Government of Western Australia Department of Biodiversity, Conservation and Attractions, meaning that it is poorly known and known from only a few locations but is not under imminent threat.
