= Stenanthemum mediale =

Conservation status
- Priority One — Poorly Known Taxa (DEC)

Scientific classification
- Kingdom: Plantae
- Clade: Tracheophytes
- Clade: Angiosperms
- Clade: Eudicots
- Clade: Rosids
- Order: Rosales
- Family: Rhamnaceae
- Genus: Stenanthemum
- Species: S. mediale

Binomial name
- Stenanthemum mediale Rye

Species of flowering plant

Stenanthemum mediale is a species of flowering plant in the family Rhamnaceae and is endemic to inland Western Australia. It is an erect shrub with densely hairy young stems, egg-shaped leaves and densely hairy heads of silvery to rust-coloured flowers.

== Description ==
Stenanthemum mediale is an erect shrub that typically grows to a height of up to 35 cm (14 in), its young stems densely hairy. Its leaves are egg-shaped with the narrower end towards the base, 3.5–7 mm (0.14–0.28 in) long and 2.5–4.5 mm (0.098–0.177 in) wide on a hairy petiole about 1 mm (0.039 in) long, with stipules joined together for their lower one-third. The upper surface is more or less glabrous and the lower surface densely hairy, the hairs pressed against the surface. The flowers arranged in clusters 5–8 mm (0.20–0.31 in) wide, surrounded by broad, often toothed bracts about 1.5 mm (0.059 in) wide, and are covered with silvery or rust-coloured hairs pressed against the surface. The floral tube is 1.5–2.5 mm (0.059–0.098 in) long and densely hairy, the sepals 1.3–1.7 mm (0.051–0.067 in) long and the petals 1.1–1.2 mm (0.043–0.047 in) long. Flowering occurs from April to August, and the fruit is a densely hairy schizocarp 3.0–3.5 mm (0.12–0.14 in) long.

== Taxonomy and naming ==
Stenanthemum mediale was first formally described in 1995 by Barbara Lynette Rye in the journal Nuytsia from specimens collected on Yeelirrie Station in 1995. The specific epithet (mediale) means "in the middle", referring to the distribution of this species in the middle of Western Australia.

== Distribution and habitat ==
This species grows in red, clayey soil in the Murchison bioregion of inland Western Australia.

== Conservation status ==
Stenanthemum mediale is listed as "Priority One" by the Government of Western Australia Department of Biodiversity, Conservation and Attractions, meaning that it is known from only one or a few locations which are potentially at risk.
