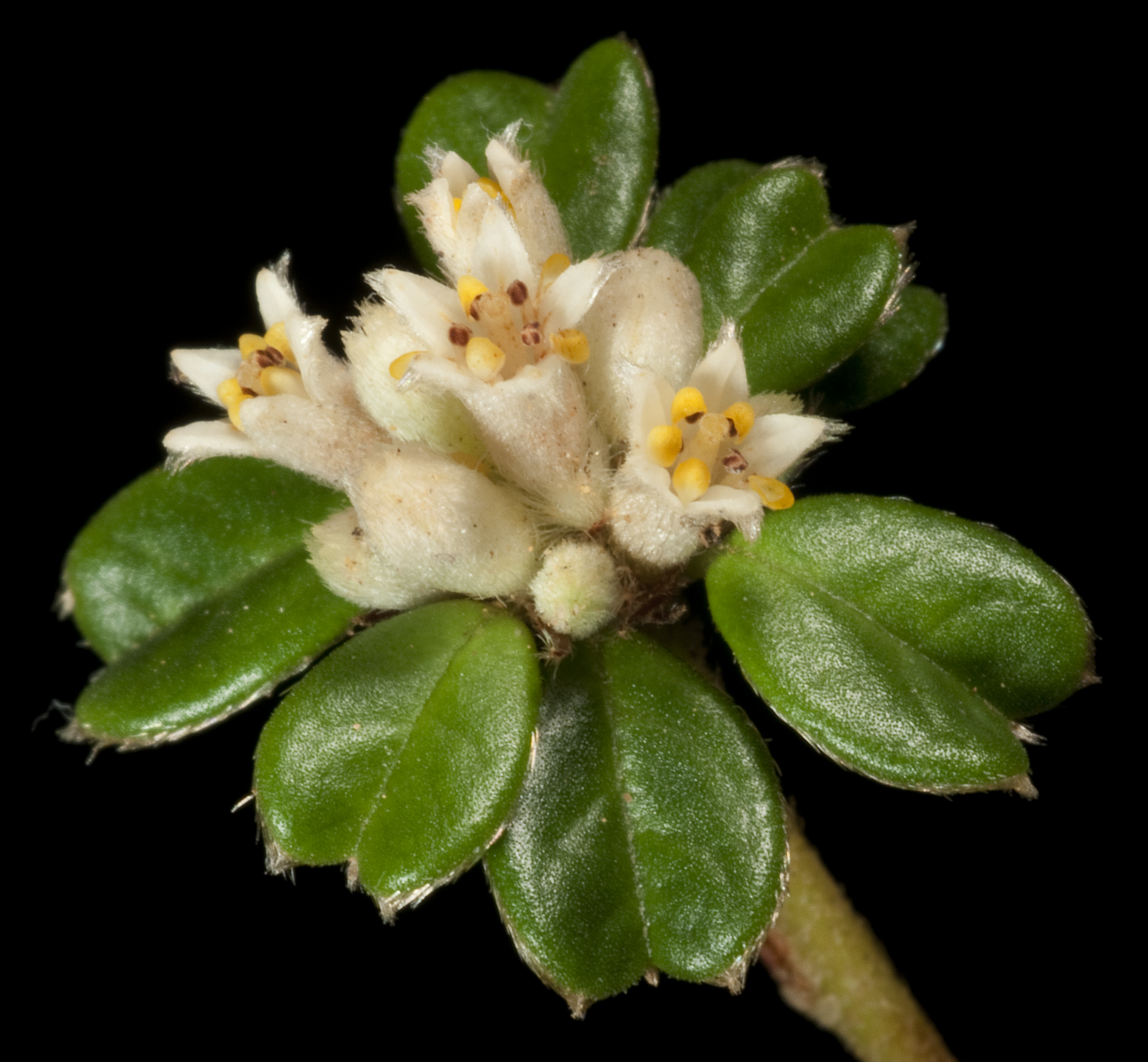

Scientific classification
- Kingdom: Plantae
- Clade: Tracheophytes
- Clade: Angiosperms
- Clade: Eudicots
- Clade: Rosids
- Order: Rosales
- Family: Rhamnaceae
- Genus: Stenanthemum
- Species: S. nanum

Binomial name
- Stenanthemum nanum Rye

= Stenanthemum nanum =

Species of flowering plant

Stenanthemum nanum is a species of flowering plant in the family Rhamnaceae and is endemic to the south-west of Western Australia. It is a prostrate shrub with hairy young stems, broadly egg-shaped leaves with the narrower end towards the base, and densely silvery-hairy heads of white or cream-coloured flowers.

== Description ==
Stenanthemum nanum is a spreading, more or less prostrate shrub that typically grows to a height of up to 10 cm (3.9 in), its young stems covered with straight and star-shaped hairs. Its leaves are broadly egg-shaped to egg-shaped with the narrower end towards the base, 5–8 mm (0.20–0.31 in) long and 3–5 mm (0.12–0.20 in) wide on a hairy petiole 0.8–2 mm (0.031–0.079 in) long, with stipules joined together for their lower one-third. There are two teeth on each side of the end of the leaf and the lower surface is densely covered with straight and star-shaped hairs. The flowers are white or cream-coloured and arranged in clusters of 5 to 15, 4–6 mm (0.16–0.24 in) wide, surrounded by broadly egg-shaped bracts 2–3 mm (0.079–0.118 in) long. The floral tube is 1.6–1.8 mm (0.063–0.071 in) long and densely hairy, the sepals about 1 mm (0.039 in) long and the petals 0.7–0.8 mm (0.028–0.031 in) long. Flowering occurs in October and November, and the fruit is a densely hairy schizocarp 2.2–2.5 mm (0.087–0.098 in) long.

== Taxonomy and naming ==
Stenanthemum nanum was first formally described in 1995 by Barbara Lynette Rye in the journal Nuytsia from specimens collected by Alex George, 50 km (31 mi) south-east of Perth in 1965. The specific epithet (nanum) means "dwarf", referring to the size of the plant.

== Distribution and habitat ==
This species grows in woodland and forest from east of Armadale to near Boddingtonin the Jarrah Forest bioregion of south-western Western Australia.

== Conservation status ==
Stenanthemum nanum is listed as "not threatened" by the Government of Western Australia Department of Biodiversity, Conservation and Attractions
