= Stenanthemum patens =

Conservation status
- Priority One — Poorly Known Taxa (DEC)

Scientific classification
- Kingdom: Plantae
- Clade: Tracheophytes
- Clade: Angiosperms
- Clade: Eudicots
- Clade: Rosids
- Order: Rosales
- Family: Rhamnaceae
- Genus: Stenanthemum
- Species: S. patens

Binomial name
- Stenanthemum patens Rye

Species of flowering plant

Stenanthemum patens is a species of flowering plant in the family Rhamnaceae and is endemic to the inland of Western Australia. It is a small shrub with densely hairy young stems and a few spines, egg-shaped to broadly egg-shaped leaves with the narrower end towards the base, and densely hairy clusters of tube-shaped flowers.

== Description ==
Stenanthemum patens is a shrub that typically grows to a height of up to 50 cm (20 in), its young stems densely hairy and with a few spines. Its leaves are egg-shaped to broadly egg-shaped with the narrower end towards the base, 5–8 mm (0.20–0.31 in) long and 4–5 mm (0.16–0.20 in) wide on a densely hairy petiole 1–2 mm (0.039–0.079 in) long, with stipules 1.3–2.5 mm (0.051–0.098 in) long and fused at the base. The tip of the leaves is curved downwards, both surfaces are hairy, and the lower surface is whitish. The flowers are arranged in densely hairy clusters 5–8 mm (0.20–0.31 in) wide, surrounded by egg-shaped to broadly egg-shaped involucral bracts 3–4 mm (0.12–0.16 in) long. The floral tube is 2.5–3 mm (0.098–0.118 in) long with lobes 2.0–2.5 mm (0.079–0.098 in) long, the sepals about 0.8 mm (0.031 in) long and the stamens about the same length as the sepals. Flowering occurs in August, and the fruit is a schizocarp about 3.5 mm (0.14 in) long.

== Taxonomy and naming ==
Stenanthemum patens was first formally described in 2001 by Barbara Lynette Rye in the journal Nuytsia from specimens collected in 1981. The specific epithet (patens) means "open" or "outstretched", referring to the spreading branchlets of this species.

== Distribution and habitat ==
This species grows on rocky hillsides in open shrubland. It is only found in a few locations about 70 km (43 mi) north of Leonora in the Murchison bioregion of inland Western Australia.

== Conservation status ==
Stenanthemum patens is listed as "Priority One" by the Government of Western Australia Department of Biodiversity, Conservation and Attractions, meaning that it is known from only one or a few locations which are potentially at risk.
