= Stenanthemum tridentatum =

Scientific classification
- Kingdom: Plantae
- Clade: Tracheophytes
- Clade: Angiosperms
- Clade: Eudicots
- Clade: Rosids
- Order: Rosales
- Family: Rhamnaceae
- Genus: Stenanthemum
- Species: S. tridentatum

Binomial name
- Stenanthemum tridentatum (Steud.) Reissek

Species of flowering plant

Stenanthemum tridentatum is a species of flowering plant in the family Rhamnaceae and is endemic to the southwest of Western Australia. It is a prostrate to upright shrub with sparsely hairy young stems, egg-shaped to fan-shaped leaves, and creamy white or creamy-yellow flowers arranged singly or in groups of up to three.

== Description ==
Stenanthemum tridentatum is a prostrate to upright, intricately branched shrub that typically grows to a height of up to 35 cm (14 in), its young stems sparsely covered with star-shaped hairs. The leaves are egg-shaped with the narrower end towards the base, to fan-shaped, 2–5 mm (0.079–0.197 in) long and 2–3 mm (0.079–0.118 in) wide on a petiole 0.5–1 mm (0.020–0.039 in) long, with stipules 1.0–1.5 mm (0.039–0.059 in) long and fused at the base. The flowers are creamy white or creamy-yellow and arranged singly, in pairs or three, 4–8 mm (0.16–0.31 in) wide, the floral tube about 1 mm (0.039 in) wide. The sepals are 0.9–1.1 mm (0.035–0.043 in) long, and the petals 0.5–0.6 mm (0.020–0.024 in) long. Flowering occurs in August, and the fruit is a more or less glabrous schizocarp 1.8–2.2 mm (0.071–0.087 in) long.

== Taxonomy and naming ==
This species was first formally described in 1845 by Ernst Gottlieb von Steudel who gave it the name Cryptandra tridentata in Lehmann's Plantae Preissianae. In 1858, Siegfried Reissek transferred it to Stenanthemum as Stenanthemum tridentatus in the journal Linnaea.

== Distribution and habitat ==
Stenanthemum tridentatum grows in woodland and shrubland between Gunyidi and Tambellup in the Avon Wheatbelt, Esperance Plains, Geraldton Sandplains, Jarrah Forest and Mallee bioregions of southwestern Western Australia.

== Conservation status ==
This species is listed as "not threatened" by the Government of Western Australia Department of Biodiversity, Conservation and Attractions.
