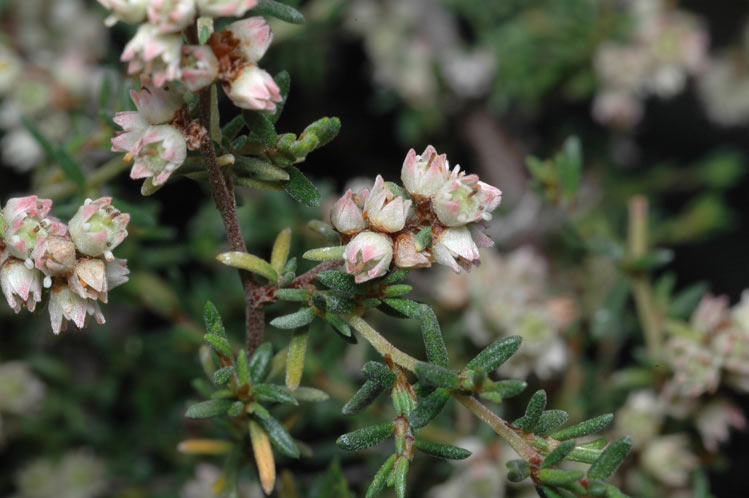
- In the Australian National Botanic Gardens

Scientific classification
- Kingdom: Plantae
- Clade: Tracheophytes
- Clade: Angiosperms
- Clade: Eudicots
- Clade: Rosids
- Order: Rosales
- Family: Rhamnaceae
- Genus: Cryptandra
- Species: C. recurva

Binomial name
- Cryptandra recurva Rye

= Cryptandra recurva =

Species of flowering plant

Cryptandra recurva is a flowering plant in the family Rhamnaceae and is endemic to Western Australia. It is an erect, spreading shrub with densely hairy young stems, narrowly oblong to narrowly egg-shaped leaves and clusters of white, cream-coloured or off-white, tube-shaped flowers.

== Description ==
Cryptandra recurva is an erect, spreading shrub that typically grows to a height of 20–70 cm (7.9–27.6 in), and has its young stems densely covered with tiny, star-shaped hairs. The leaves are narrowly oblong to narrowly egg-shaped with the narrower end towards the base, 2.0–3.8 mm (0.079–0.150 in) long and 0.5–0.8 mm (0.020–0.031 in) wide, on a petiole 0.2–0.3 mm (0.0079–0.0118 in) long with stipules 0.5–1 mm (0.020–0.039 in) long at the base. The lower surface is usually mostly concealed and the tip of the leaf curves downwards. The flowers are white, cream-coloured or off-white, sometimes pink and arranged in clusters of 3 to 15, with about 5 broadly egg-shaped floral bracts 1.0–1.5 mm (0.039–0.059 in) long. The floral tube is 1.2–1.5 mm (0.047–0.059 in) long joined at the base for 0.5–0.8 mm (0.020–0.031 in). The sepals are 0.8–1.3 mm (0.031–0.051 in) long, the style 0.5–0.8 mm (0.020–0.031 in) long. The bracts, floral tube and sepals are covered with tiny, star-shaped hairs and simple hairs. Flowering occurs from June to November, and the fruit is a schizocarp 2.0–2.5 mm (0.079–0.098 in) long and densely hairy.

== Taxonomy and naming ==
Cryptandra recurva was first formally described in 1995 by Barbara Lynette Rye in the journal Nuytsia from specimens collected on the Salmon Gums - Lake King road in 1974. The specific epithet (recurva ) means "curved backwards", referring to the tips of the leaves.

== Distribution and habitat ==
This cryptandra grows in sandy soil between Southern Cross, Coolgardie, the Fitzgerald River National Park and Cocklebiddy in the Coolgardie, Esperance Plains and Mallee bioregions of Western Australia.

== Conservation status ==
Cryptandra recurva is listed as "not threatened" by the Government of Western Australia Department of Biodiversity, Conservation and Attractions.
