= Stenanthemum yorkense =

Conservation status
- Priority One — Poorly Known Taxa (DEC)

Scientific classification
- Kingdom: Plantae
- Clade: Tracheophytes
- Clade: Angiosperms
- Clade: Eudicots
- Clade: Rosids
- Order: Rosales
- Family: Rhamnaceae
- Genus: Stenanthemum
- Species: S. yorkense

Binomial name
- Stenanthemum yorkense Rye

Species of flowering plant

Stenanthemum yorkense is a species of flowering plant in the family Rhamnaceae and is endemic to an area near York in the southwest of Western Australia. It is a low, spreading shrub with egg-shaped leaves, the narrower end towards the base, and densely crowded, head-like clusters of white, tube-shaped flowers with a yellow centre.

== Description ==
Stenanthemum yorkense is a spreading shrub that typically grows to a height of 10–15 cm (3.9–5.9 in), its young stems densely covered with whitish hairs. Its leaves are grass-like at first, later egg-shaped to broadly egg-shaped, the narrower end towards the base, 8–17 mm (0.31–0.67 in) long and 4–8 mm (0.16–0.31 in) wide on a densely hairy petiole 3–4 mm (0.12–0.16 in) long. There are stipules 5–6 mm (0.20–0.24 in) long and fused for about half their length at the base of the leaf. The flowers are white with a yellow centre, and borne in clusters up to 14 mm (0.55 in) wide. The floral tube is densely hairy, 3.5–4.5 mm (0.14–0.18 in) long, the sepals densely covered with curly hairs and about 1.3 mm (0.051 in) long. The petals are about 0.6 mm (0.024 in) long, and the fruit is spherical and about 2 mm (0.079 in) long and densely hairy.

== Taxonomy and naming ==
Stenanthemum yorkense was first formally described in 2007 by Barbara Lynette Rye in the journal Nuytsia from specimens collected near York in 2005. The specific epithet (yorkense) refers to the type location.

== Distribution and habitat ==
This species is only known from a single hill or hills on private land near York, where a large populations grows on quartzite under Eucalyptus accedens and Allocasuarina trees.

== Conservation status ==
Stenanthemum yorkense is listed as "Priority One" by the Government of Western Australia Department of Biodiversity, Conservation and Attractions, meaning that it is known from only one or a few locations which are potentially at risk.
