= Stenanthemum radiatum =

Conservation status
- Priority Two — Poorly Known Taxa (DEC)

Scientific classification
- Kingdom: Plantae
- Clade: Tracheophytes
- Clade: Angiosperms
- Clade: Eudicots
- Clade: Rosids
- Order: Rosales
- Family: Rhamnaceae
- Genus: Stenanthemum
- Species: S. radiatum

Binomial name
- Stenanthemum radiatum Rye

Species of flowering plant

Stenanthemum radiatum is a species of flowering plant in the family Rhamnaceae and is endemic to a restricted part of the southwest of Western Australia. It is a spreading shrub with narrowly triangular or wedge-shaped to heart-shaped leaves and densely crowded, head-like clusters of white, densely hairy, tube-shaped flowers.

== Description ==
Stenanthemum radiatum is a spreading shrub that typically grows to a height of 10–30 cm (3.9–11.8 in), its young stems sparsely covered with white star-shaped and simple hairs. Its leaves are narrowly triangular to wedge-shaped or heart-shaped with the narrower end towards the base, 8–14 mm (0.31–0.55 in) long and 3–5 mm (0.12–0.20 in) wide on a petiole 1–2 mm (0.039–0.079 in) long, with broad, fused stipules 2–3 mm (0.079–0.118 in) long at the base. Most leaves have a deeply notched tip, the edges of the leaves is rolled under, and the lower surface is hairy. The flowers are white, densely hairy and borne in densely crowded, head-like clusters 5–8 mm (0.20–0.31 in) wide on the ends of branches. The clusters are surrounded by two or more radiating leaves, giving the clusters a daisy-like appearance. The floral tube is densely hairy, about 1 mm (0.039 in) long, the sepals densely hairy and about 1 mm (0.039 in) long and the petals about 0.6 mm (0.024 in) long. Flowering occurs from September to November, and the fruit is 1.8–2.0 mm (0.071–0.079 in) long and densely hairy.

== Taxonomy and naming ==
Stenanthemum radiatum was first formally described in 2007 by Barbara Lynette Rye in the journal Nuytsia from specimens collected in 1998 in the Burma Road Nature Reserve. The specific epithet (radiatum) means "with spokes" or "radiating", referring to the arrangement of the leaves around the flower clusters.

== Distribution and habitat ==
This species is only known from the Burma Road Nature Reserve where it grows on laterite with species of Calothamnus, Hakea and Allocasuarina in the Geraldton Sandplains bioregion of south-western Western Australia.

== Conservation status ==
Stenanthemum radiatum is listed as "Priority Two" by the Western Australian Government Department of Biodiversity, Conservation and Attractions, meaning that it is poorly known and from only one or a few locations.
