= I. brasiliensis =

I. brasiliensis may refer to:

- Isistius brasiliensis, the cookiecutter shark, a small dogfish shark species found in warm oceanic waters worldwide
- Ilex brasiliensis, the Brazilian holly, a plant species native from Brazil
