= Stenanthemum sublineare =

Conservation status
- Priority Two — Poorly Known Taxa (DEC)

Scientific classification
- Kingdom: Plantae
- Clade: Tracheophytes
- Clade: Angiosperms
- Clade: Eudicots
- Clade: Rosids
- Order: Rosales
- Family: Rhamnaceae
- Genus: Stenanthemum
- Species: S. sublineare

Binomial name
- Stenanthemum sublineare Rye

Species of flowering plant

Stenanthemum sublineare is a species of flowering plant in the family Rhamnaceae and is endemic to the southwest of Western Australia. It is an erect shrub with sparsely hairy young stems, narrowly egg-shaped to linear leaves, and small clusters of densely hairy, greenish, tube-shaped flowers.

== Description ==
Stenanthemum sublineare is an erect shrub that typically grows up to about 10 cm (3.9 in) high and 4 cm (1.6 in) wide and lacks spines, its young stems sparsely hairy. Its leaves are narrowly egg-shaped to linear, 4–6 mm (0.16–0.24 in) long and 0.5–0.8 mm (0.020–0.031 in) wide on a glabrous petiole 0.6–1 mm (0.024–0.039 in) long, with stipules about 1 mm (0.039 in) long and fused at the base. The edges of the leaves are turned down or rolled under, the upper surface more or less glabrous, the lower surface mostly obscured. The flowers are greenish and arranged singly or in groups of up to 3 in leaf axils, the groups up to 4 mm (0.16 in) wide, with 2 egg-shaped bracts at the base. The floral tube and sepals are about 1 mm (0.039 in) long. Flowering occurs from October to December.

== Taxonomy and naming ==
Stenanthemum sublineare was first formally described in 2001 by Barbara Lynette Rye in the journal Nuytsia from specimens collected near Bullsbrook in 1997. The specific epithet (sublineare) means "almost linear", referring to the leaves.

== Distribution and habitat ==
This species grows in woodland, dominated by Banksia attenuata, and is only known from the Swan Coastal Plain near Bullsbrook.

== Conservation status ==
Stenanthemum sublineare is listed as "Priority Two" by the Western Australian Government Department of Biodiversity, Conservation and Attractions, meaning that it is poorly known and from only one or a few locations.
