= Stenanthemum coronatum =

Scientific classification
- Kingdom: Plantae
- Clade: Tracheophytes
- Clade: Angiosperms
- Clade: Eudicots
- Clade: Rosids
- Order: Rosales
- Family: Rhamnaceae
- Genus: Stenanthemum
- Species: S. coronatum

Binomial name
- Stenanthemum coronatum (Reissek) Reissek

Species of flowering plant

Stenanthemum coronatum is a species of flowering plant in the family Rhamnaceae and is endemic to the southwest of Western Australia. It is a prostrate shrub with sparsely hairy young stems, broadly egg-shaped leaves and densely shaggy-hairy heads of tube-shaped flowers.

== Description ==
Stenanthemum coronatum is a prostrate shrub that typically grows to 2–5 cm (0.79–1.97 in) high and 15 cm (5.9 in) wide, its young stems sparsely covered with star-shaped hairs. Its leaves are broadly egg-shaped with the narrower end towards the base, 4–5 mm (0.16–0.20 in) long and 3–4 mm (0.12–0.16 in) wide on a petiole 1.0–1.5 mm (0.039–0.059 in) long, with narrowly triangular stipules 2.0–3.5 mm (0.079–0.138 in) long and fused together. There is a deep notch at the tip of the leaves with a sharp point on each side of the notch. The flowers are creamy-white and densely covered with shaggy white hairs, the floral tube about 3 mm (0.12 in) long and 1.0–1.2 mm (0.039–0.047 in) wide, the sepals 1.2–1.6 mm (0.047–0.063 in) long and the petals about 0.8 mm (0.031 in) long. Flowering occurs from September to November, and the fruit is 2.0–2.3 mm (0.079–0.091 in) long.

== Taxonomy and naming ==
This species was first formally described in 1848 by Siegfried Reissek who gave it the name Cryptandra coronata in Johann Georg Christian Lehmann's Plantae Preissianae. In 1858, Reissek changed the name to Stenanthemum coronatum in the journal Linnaea. The specific epithet (coronatum) means "crowned", referring to the leaf clusters on the ends of branches.

== Distribution and habitat ==
Stenanthemum coronatum grows in woodland on laterite ridges between Bindoon and Narrogin in the Jarrah Forest bioregion of south-western Western Australia.
