= Stenanthemum complicatum =

Scientific classification
- Kingdom: Plantae
- Clade: Tracheophytes
- Clade: Angiosperms
- Clade: Eudicots
- Clade: Rosids
- Order: Rosales
- Family: Rhamnaceae
- Genus: Stenanthemum
- Species: S. complicatum

Binomial name
- Stenanthemum complicatum (F.Muell.) Rye

Species of flowering plant

Stenanthemum complicatum is a species of flowering plant in the family Rhamnaceae and is endemic to the southwest of Western Australia. It is a woody, erect or straggling shrub with densely hairy young stems, broadly egg-shaped leaves and densely woolly-hairy heads of tube-shaped flowers.

== Description ==
Stenanthemum complicatum is a woody, erect or straggling shrub that typically grows to a height of 20–80 cm (7.9–31.5 in), its young stems densely covered with soft, rust-coloured hairs. Its leaves are broadly egg-shaped with the narrower end towards the base, mostly 8–12 mm (0.31–0.47 in) long and 4–8 mm (0.16–0.31 in) wide on a petiole 1–5 mm (0.039–0.197 in) long, with triangular stipules 1–3 mm (0.039–0.118 in) long at the base. The upper surface of the leaves is covered with greyish, velvety hairs and the lower surface is densely covered with greyish or rust-covered hairs. The flowers are densely covered with woolly white hairs and borne in groups of 10 to 50, up to 10 mm (0.39 in) wide. The floral tube is 0.6–0.8 mm (0.024–0.031 in) long and 0.8–1.5 mm (0.031–0.059 in) wide, the sepals 0.9–1.2 mm (0.035–0.047 in) long and the petals 0.6–0.7 mm (0.024–0.028 in) long. Flowering occurs from August to October, and the fruit is 2.5–3.0 mm (0.098–0.118 in) long.

== Taxonomy and naming ==
This species was first formally described in 1862 by Ferdinand von Mueller who gave it the name Spyridium complicatum in Fragmenta Phytographiae Australiae from specimens collected by Augustus Oldfield near the Murchison River. In 1995, Barbara Lynette Rye changed the name to Stenanthemum complicatum in the journal Nuytsia. The specific epithet (complicatum) means "folded upon itself", referring to the leaves.

== Distribution and habitat ==
Stenanthemum complicatum grows on sandplains from Shark Bay to Mullewa in the Carnarvon, Geraldton Sandplains and Yalgoo bioregions of south-western Western Australia.
