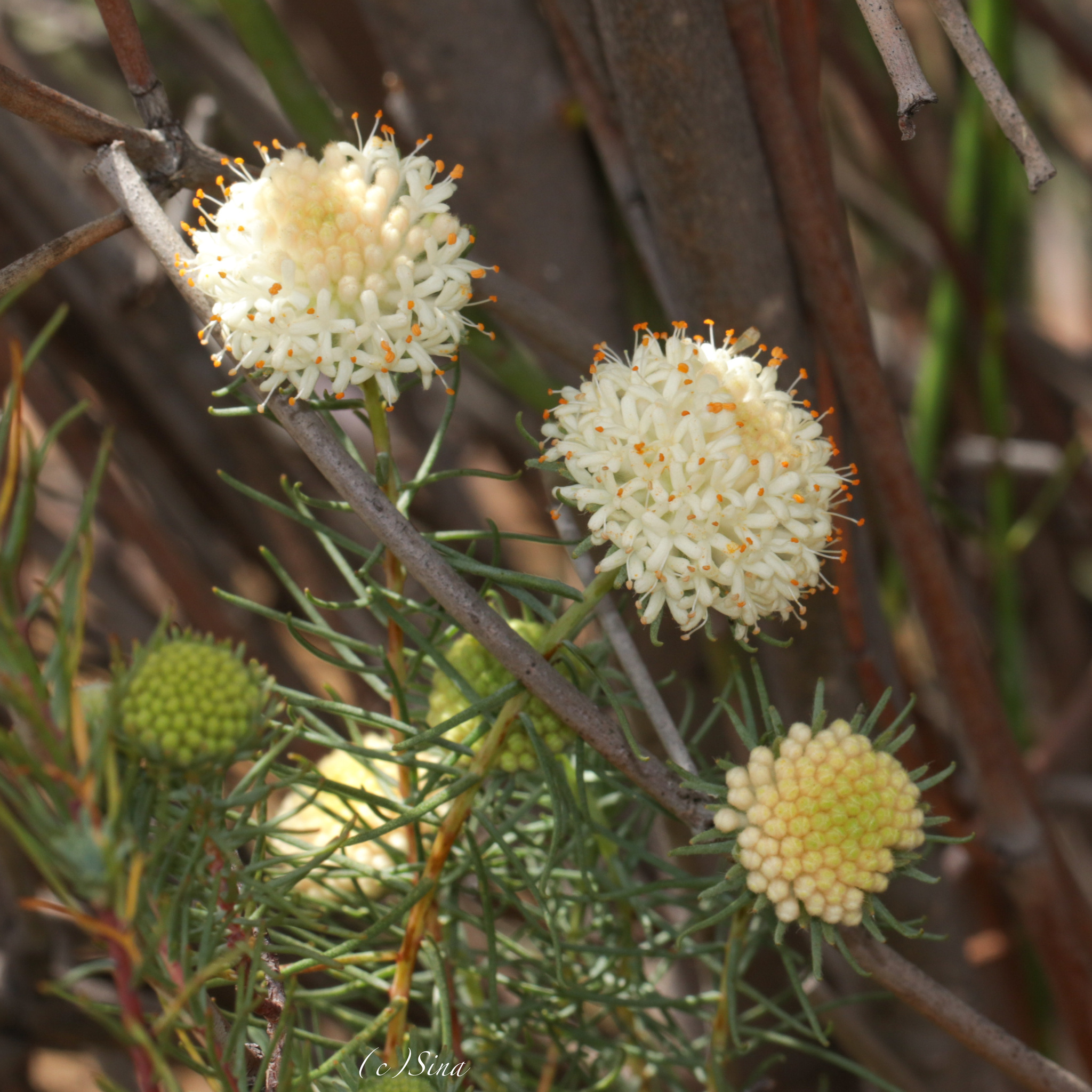

Scientific classification
- Kingdom: Plantae
- Clade: Tracheophytes
- Clade: Angiosperms
- Clade: Eudicots
- Clade: Rosids
- Order: Malvales
- Family: Thymelaeaceae
- Genus: Pimelea
- Species: P. graniticola

Binomial name
- Pimelea graniticola Rye

= Pimelea graniticola =

Species of flowering plant

Pimelea graniticola is a species of flowering plant in the family Thymelaeaceae and is endemic to the southwest of Western Australia. It is a shrub with linear leaves and large clusters of erect, cream-coloured or white flowers surrounded by about 40 green involucral bracts.

== Description ==
Pimelea graniticola is an erect, spreading shrub that typically grows to a height of 0.2–1 m (7.9 in – 3 ft 3.4 in) with glabrous stems. The leaves are arranged alternately, linear, 4–17 mm (0.16–0.67 in) long, 0.5–1 mm (0.020–0.039 in) wide and pale green or bluish green. The flowers are arranged in erect, many-flowered clusters on a peduncle up to 1 mm (0.039 in) long and surrounded by about 400 involucral bracts that are a similar colour to the leaves. The bracts are narrowly triangular to linear, 6–8 mm (0.24–0.31 in) long and 1–2 mm (0.039–0.079 in) wide, each flower on a hairy pedicel 0.2–0.5 mm (0.0079–0.0197 in) long. The flowers are cream-coloured to white, the flower tube 5.0–7.5 mm (0.20–0.30 in) long, the sepals 2–5 mm (0.079–0.197 in) long, and the stamens extend beyond the end of the flower tube. Flowering occurs between September and December.

== Taxonomy ==
Pimelea graniticola was first formally described in 1988 by Barbara Lynette Rye and the description was published in the journal Nuytsia. The specific epithet (graniticola) means "granite inhabitant" and refers to the habitat of the species.

== Distribution and habitat ==
This pimelea grows on granite outcrops from near Merredin to east of Lake King in the Avon Wheatbelt, Coolgardie, Esperance Plains, Jarrah Forest and Mallee bioregions of south-western Western Australia.

== Conservation status ==
Pimelea graniticola is listed as "not threatened" by the Government of Western Australia Department of Biodiversity, Conservation and Attractions.
