= Stenanthemum divaricatum =

Conservation status
- Priority Three — Poorly Known Taxa (DEC)

Scientific classification
- Kingdom: Plantae
- Clade: Tracheophytes
- Clade: Angiosperms
- Clade: Eudicots
- Clade: Rosids
- Order: Rosales
- Family: Rhamnaceae
- Genus: Stenanthemum
- Species: S. divaricatum

Binomial name
- Stenanthemum divaricatum (Benth.) Rye

Species of flowering plant

Stenanthemum divaricatum is a species of flowering plant in the family Rhamnaceae and is endemic to the southwest of Western Australia. It is a small, often spiny shrub with sparsely hairy young stems, fan-shaped to narrowly egg-shaped leaves and densely, softly-hairy heads of tube-shaped flowers.

== Description ==
Stenanthemum divaricatum is an often spiny shrub that typically grows to a height of up to 20 cm (7.9 in) and has many branches, its young stems sparsely covered with soft, greyish hairs. Its leaves are fan-shaped to narrowly egg-shaped with the narrower end towards the base, mostly 3–8 mm (0.12–0.31 in) long and 1.5–4 mm (0.059–0.157 in) wide on a petiole 0.3–1 mm (0.012–0.039 in) long, with broadly triangular to rectangular stipules 0.8–1.2 mm (0.031–0.047 in) long and joined together at the base. The upper surface of the leaves is glabrous and the lower surface is covered with soft, greyish hairs. The flowers are moderately to densely covered with soft, greyish hairs. The floral tube is 0.1–0.2 mm (0.0039–0.0079 in) long and 0.7–0.9 mm (0.028–0.035 in) wide, the sepals 0.7–1.0 mm (0.028–0.039 in) long and the petals 0.5–0.6 mm (0.020–0.024 in) long. Flowering occurs in August and September, and the fruit is about 2 mm (0.079 in) long.

== Taxonomy and naming ==
This species was first formally described in 1863 by George Bentham who gave it the name Spyridium divaricatum in Flora Australiensis from specimens collected by Augustus Oldfield. In 1995, Barbara Lynette Rye changed the name to Stenanthemum divaricatum in the journal Nuytsia. The specific epithet (divaricatum) means "widely-spreading" or "forked".

== Distribution and habitat ==
Stenanthemum divaricatum grows in shrubland on sand near Shark Bay in the Carnarvon, Geraldton Sandplains and Yalgoo bioregions of south-western Western Australia.

== Conservation status ==
Stenanthemum divaricatum is listed as "Priority Three" by the Government of Western Australia Department of Biodiversity, Conservation and Attractions, meaning that it is poorly known and known from only a few locations but is not under imminent threat.
