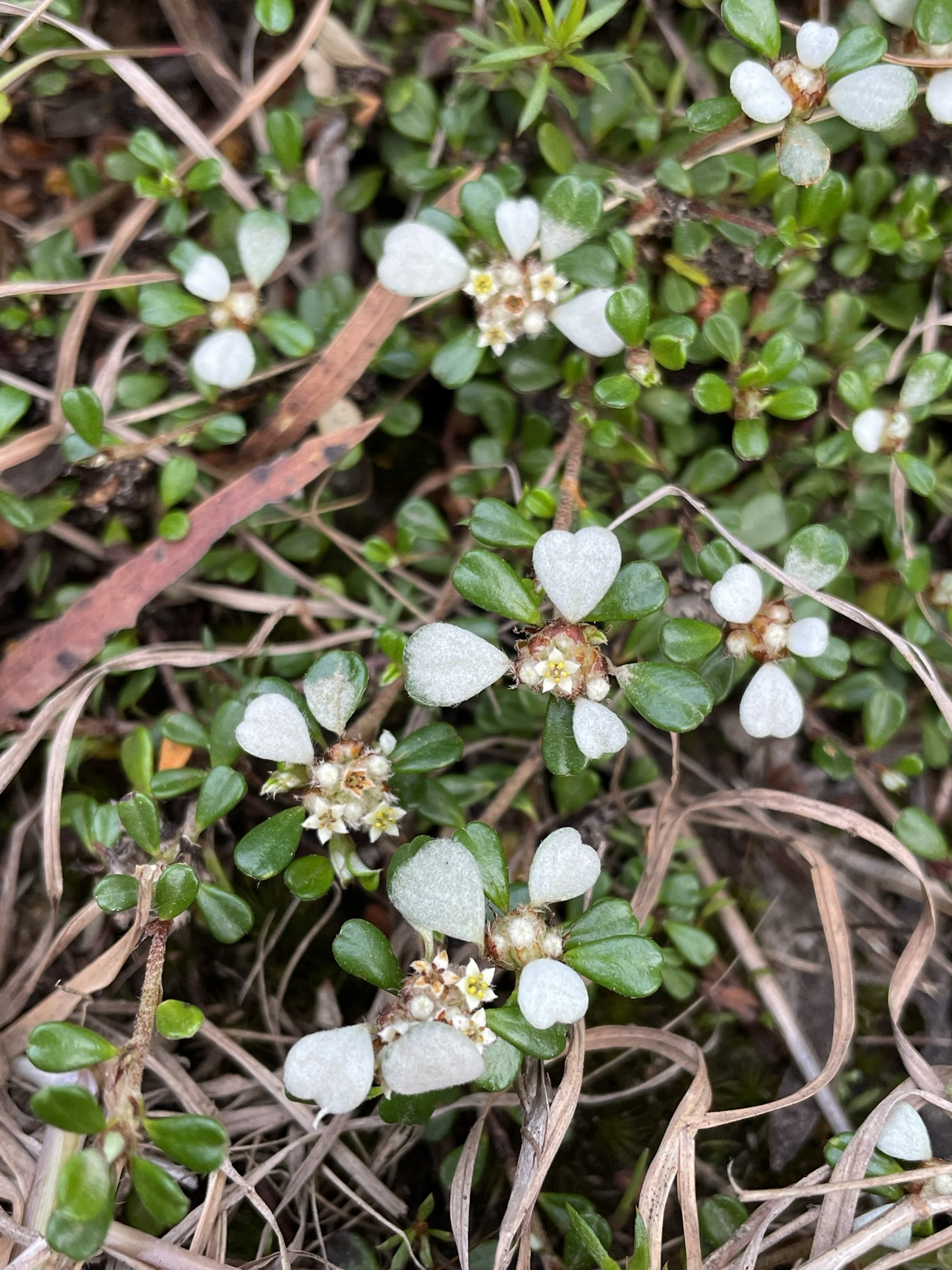
- Near Swansea

Conservation status
- Vulnerable (EPBC Act)

Scientific classification
- Kingdom: Plantae
- Clade: Embryophytes
- Clade: Tracheophytes
- Clade: Angiosperms
- Clade: Eudicots
- Clade: Rosids
- Order: Rosales
- Family: Rhamnaceae
- Genus: Stenanthemum
- Species: S. pimeleoides

Binomial name
- Stenanthemum pimeleoides Hook.f.

= Stenanthemum pimeleoides =

Species of flowering plant

Stenanthemum pimeleoides, commonly known as spreading stenanthemum or propellor plant, is a species of flowering plant in the family Rhamnaceae and is endemic to Tasmania. It is a small, prostrate, mat-forming shrub with hairy young stems, egg-shaped leaves with the narrower end towards the base, and densely hairy clusters of tube-shaped flowers surrounded by conspicuous, whitish floral leaves.

== Description ==
Stenanthemum pimeleoides is a prostrate, mat-forming shrub that has branches 15–30 cm (5.9–11.8 in), its young stems covered with shaggy, rust-coloured or greyish hairs. Its leaves are egg-shaped with the narrower end towards the base or fan-shaped, 2–7 mm (0.079–0.276 in) long and 2–6 mm (0.079–0.236 in) wide on a petiole 1.0–2.5 mm (0.039–0.098 in) long. There are narrowly triangular stipules 2.5–7 mm (0.098–0.276 in) long fused at the base and often sheathing the stem. The upper surface of the leaves is glabrous, the lower surface with shaggy hairs pressed against the surface. The flowers are arranged in densely hairy clusters of 10 to 50 flowers, the clusters about 10 mm (0.39 in) wide, surrounded by 2 or 3 conspicuous, white, woolly-hairy floral leaves. The floral tube is 2.4–2.7 mm (0.094–0.106 in) long, the sepals 0.8–1.2 mm (0.031–0.047 in) long and the petals 0.6–0.7 mm (0.024–0.028 in) long. Flowering occurs from December to February, and the fruit is a schizocarp 2.0–2.5 mm (0.079–0.098 in) long.

== Taxonomy and naming ==
This species was first formally described in 1844 by Joseph Dalton Hooker who gave it the name Cryptandra pimeleoides in his Flora Antarctica from specimens collected by James Backhouse. In 1863, George Bentham changed the name to Stenanthemum pimeleoides in Flora Australiensis. The specific epithet (pimeleoides) means "pimelea-like".

== Distribution and habitat ==
Stenanthemum pimeleoides grows in heath and forest and is endemic to Tasmania, where it grows on the east coast between Orford and Bicheno.

== Conservation status ==
Stenanthemum pimeleoides is listed as "vulnerable" under the Australian Government Environment Protection and Biodiversity Conservation Act 1999 and the Tasmanian Government Threatened Species Protection Act 1995.
