= Pimelea erecta =

Scientific classification
- Kingdom: Plantae
- Clade: Tracheophytes
- Clade: Angiosperms
- Clade: Eudicots
- Clade: Rosids
- Order: Malvales
- Family: Thymelaeaceae
- Genus: Pimelea
- Species: P. erecta

Binomial name
- Pimelea erecta Rye

Species of flowering plant

Pimelea erecta is a species of flowering plant in the family Thymelaeaceae and is endemic to the southwest of Western Australia. It is an erect, often spreading shrub with elliptic to egg-shaped leaves arranged in opposite pairs, and clusters of erect, white or pale pink flowers.

== Description ==
Pimelea erecta is an erect, often spreading shrub that typically grows to a height of 0.3–1 m (1 ft 0 in – 3 ft 3 in) with a single glabrous, pale brown to greyish stem at ground level. The leaves are arranged in opposite pairs, elliptic to egg-shaped, 5–20 mm (0.20–0.79 in) long and 1.5–5 mm (0.059–0.197 in) wide on a petiole 0.4–1.0 mm (0.016–0.039 in) long. The flowers are arranged in clusters on a peduncle 1–8 mm (0.039–0.315 in) long with 8 or 10 involucral bracts 5–11 mm (0.20–0.43 in) long and 1.3–4 mm (0.051–0.157 in) wide at the base, each flower on a hairy pedicel 0.1–0.2 mm (0.0039–0.0079 in) long. The flowers are white to pink, the flower tube 6–8 mm (0.24–0.31 in) long and the sepals are egg-shaped, densely hairy outside and 2.5–3.5 mm (0.098–0.138 in) long. The stamens and style extend beyond the end of the flower tube. Flowering occurs between July and March with a peak between October and January.

== Taxonomy ==
Pimelea erecta was first formally described in 1988 by Barbara Lynette Rye and the description was published in the journal Nuytsia. The specific epithet (erecta) refers to the flowers and involucral bracts.

== Distribution and habitat ==
This pimelea grows in sand or clay between the Ongerup and Israelite Bay in the Avon Wheatbelt, Coolgardie, Esperance Plains, Jarrah Forest and Mallee bioregions of south-western Western Australia.

== Conservation status ==
Pimelea erecta is listed as "not threatened" by the Government of Western Australia Department of Biodiversity, Conservation and Attractions.
