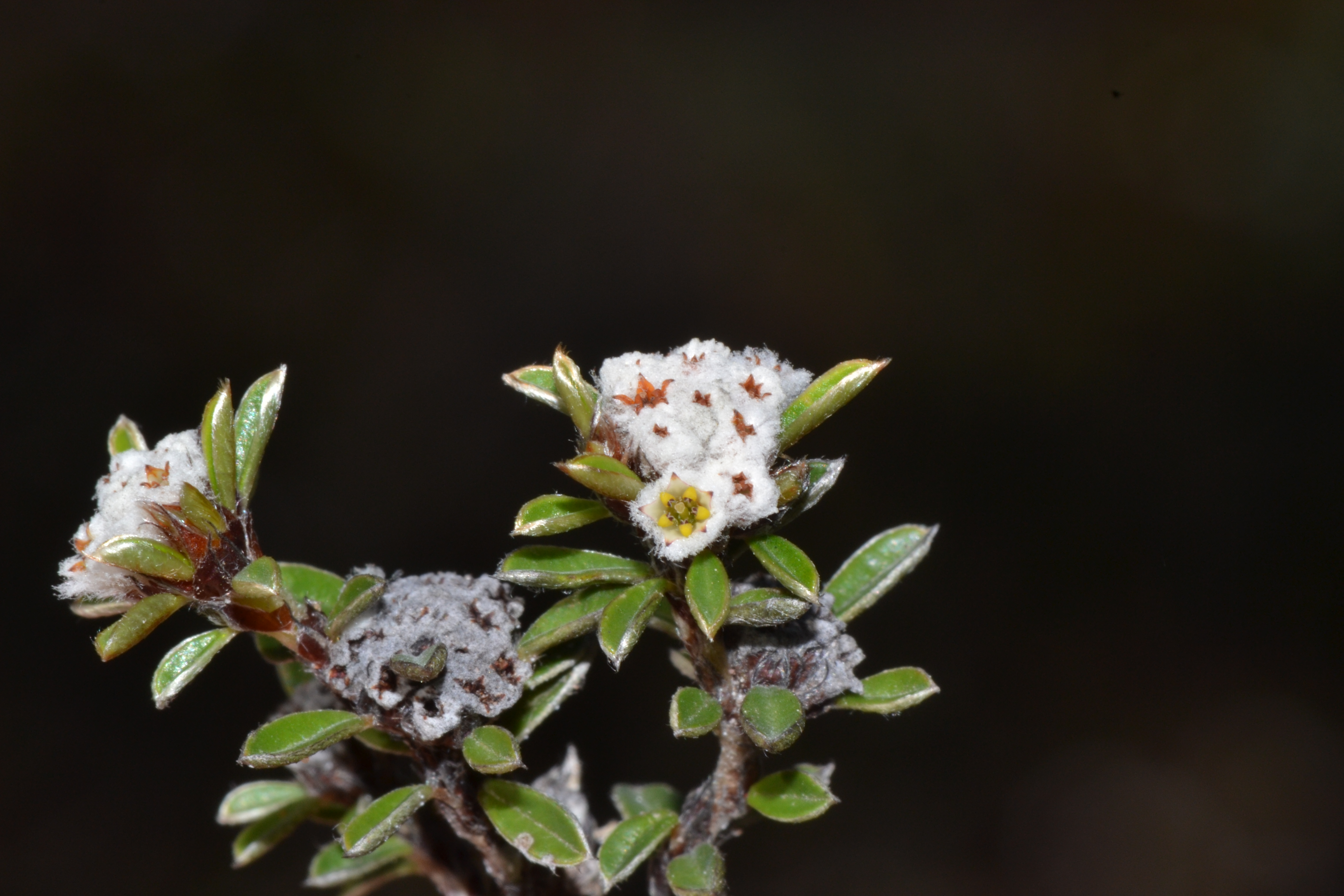
- In Stirling Range National Park

Scientific classification
- Kingdom: Plantae
- Clade: Tracheophytes
- Clade: Angiosperms
- Clade: Eudicots
- Clade: Rosids
- Order: Rosales
- Family: Rhamnaceae
- Genus: Stenanthemum
- Species: S. pumilum

Binomial name
- Stenanthemum pumilum (F.Muell.) Diels

Synonyms
- Cryptandra pumila (F.Muell.) F.Muell.; Spyridium pumilum F.Muell.; Stenanthemum leucocephalum Domin nom. inval., pro syn.

= Stenanthemum pumilum =

Species of flowering plant

Stenanthemum pumilum is a species of flowering plant in the family Rhamnaceae and is endemic to the southwest of Western Australia. It is a low, compact shrub with hairy young stems, egg-shaped leaves, sometimes with the narrower end towards the base, and clusters of 10 to 30 white to creamy-white, woolly hairy, tube-shaped flowers.

== Description ==
Stenanthemum pumilum is a compact shrub that typically grows to a height of 2–5 cm (0.79–1.97 in), sometimes to 15 cm (5.9 in), but up to 15 cm (5.9 in) wide, its young stems covered with silvery or rust-coloured hairs. Its leaves are narrowly egg-shaped to broadly egg-shaped with the narrower end towards the base, 2.5–14 mm (0.098–0.551 in) long and 0.8–5 mm (0.031–0.197 in) wide on a petiole 1–3 mm (0.039–0.118 in) long with egg-shaped or broadly triangular stipules 1.5–4 mm (0.059–0.157 in) long sheathing the stems. The lower surface of the leaves is densely covered with soft hairs pressed against the surface. The flowers are white to creamy-white, densely covered with woolly hairs and borne in clusters of 10 to 30, 5–10 mm (0.20–0.39 in) wide. The floral tube is 1.5–2.6 mm (0.059–0.102 in) long and 1.0–1.4 mm (0.039–0.055 in) wide, the sepals densely woolly-hairy and 0.8–1.4 mm (0.031–0.055 in) long, and the petals 0.5–0.7 mm (0.020–0.028 in) long. Flowering time depends on subspecies, and the fruit is 1.8–2.6 mm (0.071–0.102 in) long.

== Taxonomy and naming ==
This species was first formally described in 1875 by Ferdinand von Mueller who gave it the name Spyridium pumilum in Fragmenta Phytographiae Australiae from specimens he collected in the Stirling Range. In 1904, Ludwig Diels changed the name to Stenanthemum pumilum in the journal Botanische Jahrbücher für Systematik, Pflanzengeschichte und Pflanzengeographie. The specific epithet (pumilum) means "diminutive" or "little".

In 2007, Barbara Lynette Rye described two subspecies of S. pumilum, and the names are accepted by the Australian Plant Census:

- Stenanthemum pumilum subsp. majus Rye has leaf blades 9–14 mm (0.35–0.55 in) long and the free part of the floral tube 1.8–2.6 mm (0.071–0.102 in) long. Flowering occurs from September to December.
- Stenanthemum pumilum (F.Muell.) Diels subsp. pumilum has leaf blades 4–7 mm (0.16–0.28 in) long and the free part of the floral tube about 1 mm (0.039 in) long. Flowering occurs in September and October.

== Distribution and habitat ==
Stenanthemum pumilum subsp. majas grows with Allocasuarina and Eucalyptus species, often in gravelly laterite or on granite outcrops, between the Brookton Highway and Highbury in the Avon Wheatbelt and Jarrah Forest bioregions of south-western Western Australia. Subspecies pumilum mostly grows in low heath and is restricted to the eastern half of the Stirling Range in the Esperance Plains bioregion.

== Conservation status ==
Subspecies majus is listed as "not threatened" by the Western Australian Government Department of Biodiversity, Conservation and Attractions, but subsp. pumilum is listed as "Priority Three", meaning that it is poorly known and known from only a few locations but is not under imminent threat.
