= Stenanthemum bremerense =

Conservation status
- Priority Four — Rare Taxa (DEC)

Scientific classification
- Kingdom: Plantae
- Clade: Tracheophytes
- Clade: Angiosperms
- Clade: Eudicots
- Clade: Rosids
- Order: Rosales
- Family: Rhamnaceae
- Genus: Stenanthemum
- Species: S. bremerense

Binomial name
- Stenanthemum bremerense Rye

Species of flowering plant

Stenanthemum bremerense is a species of flowering plant in the family Rhamnaceae and is endemic to the southwest of Western Australia. It is an erect, or low spreading shrub with hairy young stems, broadly egg-shaped leaves and densely hairy heads of tube-shaped flowers, sometimes with whitish floral leaves.

== Description ==
Stenanthemum bremerense is an erect, or low, spreading shrub that typically grows to a height of 30–60 cm (12–24 in), its young stems densely covered with rust-coloured hairs. Its leaves are broadly egg-shaped with the narrower end towards the base, 3–9 mm (0.12–0.35 in) long and 2.5–5 mm (0.098–0.197 in) wide on a petiole 1.0–2.5 mm (0.039–0.098 in) long, with triangular stipules 2.3–4.0 mm (0.091–0.157 in) long at the base. The upper surface of the leaves is minutely pimply, and the lower surface is densely covered with greyish, star-shaped hairs. The leaves are mostly folded lengthwise. The flowers are densely hairy and borne in groups 3–15 mm (0.12–0.59 in) wide sometimes surrounded by whitish flower leaves. The floral tube is 1–2.2 mm (0.039–0.087 in) long and 1.0–1.4 mm (0.039–0.055 in) wide, the sepals 1.5–2.0 mm (0.059–0.079 in) long and the petals 0.6–0.9 mm (0.024–0.035 in) long. Flowering has been observed in May, June, October and November, and the fruit is 2.0–2.5 mm (0.079–0.098 in) long.

== Taxonomy and naming ==
Stenanthemum bremerense was first formally described in 2007 by Barbara Lynette Rye in the journal Nuytsia from specimens collected in 2004. The specific epithet (bremerense) refers to the Bremer Range, as the species mainly occurs near it.

== Distribution and habitat ==
This species grows on laterite outcrops and breakaways near the Bremer Range and in a single location near Marvel Loch, in the Coolgardie bioregion of south-western Western Australia.

== Conservation status ==
Stenanthemum bremerense is listed as "Priority Four" by the Government of Western Australia Department of Biodiversity, Conservation and Attractions, meaning that it is rare or near threatened.
