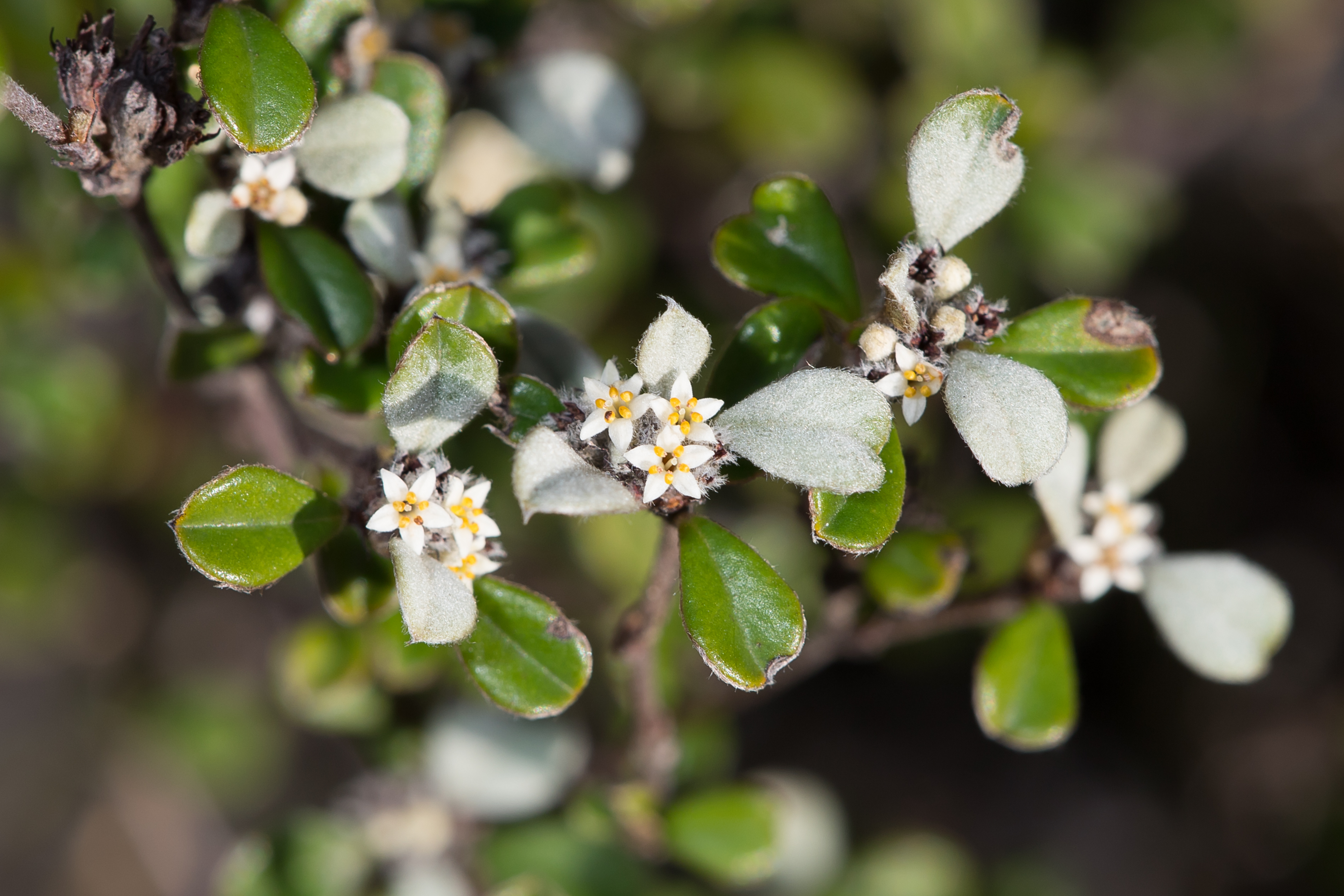

Scientific classification
- Kingdom: Plantae
- Clade: Tracheophytes
- Clade: Angiosperms
- Clade: Eudicots
- Clade: Rosids
- Order: Rosales
- Family: Rhamnaceae
- Genus: Stenanthemum
- Species: S. leucophractum

Binomial name
- Stenanthemum leucophractum (Schltdl.)Reissek

Synonyms
- Cryptandra leucophracta Schltdl.; Solenandra leucophracta (Schltdl.) Kuntze; Solenandra leucophractum Kuntze orth. var.; Spyridium leucophractum (Schltdl.) F.Muell.; Trymalium leucophractum Reissek nom. inval., pro syn.

= Stenanthemum leucophractum =

Species of flowering plant

Stenanthemum leucophractum, commonly known as rusty poison, white cryptandra or white stenanthemum, is a species of flowering plant in the family Rhamnaceae and is endemic to south-eastern continental Australia. It is a spreading shrub or subshrub with softly-hairy young stems, egg-shaped to fan-shaped leaves and heads of white or yellowish flowers surrounded by white, felt-like floral leaves.

== Description ==
Stenanthemum leucophractum is a soft, spreading shrub or subshrub that typically grows to a height of 25–40 cm (9.8–15.7 in), its branchlets covered with woolly, rust-coloured hairs. Its leaves are egg-shaped to heart-shaped with the narrower end towards the base, to spatula-shaped, 3–10 mm (0.12–0.39 in) long and 2.5–8 mm (0.098–0.315 in) wide, with linear stipules 2–3 mm (0.079–0.118 in) long and joined together at the base. Both surfaces of the leaves are covered with whitish or rust-coloured hairs. The flowers are white or yellowish, and arranged in sessile heads 5–10 mm (0.20–0.39 in) wide, surrounded by small brown bracts and 2 or more whitish, felt-like floral leaves. The floral tube is 2.5–3.5 mm (0.098–0.138 in) long and 0.8–1 mm (0.031–0.039 in) wide, the sepals 1.0–1.2 mm (0.039–0.047 in) long and the petals 0.5–0.6 mm (0.020–0.024 in) long. Flowering occurs from September to December, and the fruit is an oval capsule 2.0–3.0 mm (0.079–0.118 in) long.

== Taxonomy and naming ==
Stenanthemum leucophractum was first formally described in 1847 by Diederich Franz Leonhard von Schlechtendal who gave it the name Cryptandra leucophracta in the journal Linnaea. In 1858, Siegfried Reissek changed the name to Stenanthemum leucophractum. The specific epithet (leucophractum) means "white-protected", referring to the floral leaves.

== Distribution and habitat ==
Rusty poison grows in mallee and is found in north-western Victoria, including in the Little Desert National Park, from the Eyre Peninsula to Kangaroo Island in South Australia, and between the Ardlethan and Hillston districts of inland New South Wales.
