= Stenanthemum limitatum =

Conservation status
- Priority Two — Poorly Known Taxa (DEC)

Scientific classification
- Kingdom: Plantae
- Clade: Tracheophytes
- Clade: Angiosperms
- Clade: Eudicots
- Clade: Rosids
- Order: Rosales
- Family: Rhamnaceae
- Genus: Stenanthemum
- Species: S. limitatum

Binomial name
- Stenanthemum limitatum Rye

Species of flowering plant

Stenanthemum limitatum is a species of flowering plant in the family Rhamnaceae and is endemic to the southwest of Western Australia. It is an erect or straggling shrub with sparsely hairy young stems, egg-shaped to fan-shaped leaves and greyish, softly-hairy heads of white or cream-coloured flowers.

== Description ==
Stenanthemum limitatum is an erect or straggling shrub that typically grows to a height of up to 1 m (3 ft 3 in), its young stems sparsely covered with grey or rust-coloured, star-shaped hairs. Its leaves are egg-shaped with the narrower end towards the base, to almost fan-shaped, mostly 6–10 mm (0.24–0.39 in) long and 3–4 mm (0.12–0.16 in) wide on a petiole 0.5–1 mm (0.020–0.039 in) long, with narrowly triangular stipules 1–2 mm (0.039–0.079 in) long and joined at the base. The end of the leaf is notched, the upper surface scaly or bristly-hairy and the lower surface glabrous or softly hairy. The flowers arranged in groups of 5 to 10, up to 10 mm (0.39 in) wide, white to cream-coloured, and sparsely to moderately covered with softly-hairy, greyish, star-shaped hairs. The floral tube is 2.5–3.0 mm (0.098–0.118 in) long and 0.8–1.5 mm (0.031–0.059 in) wide, the sepals 1.0–1.5 mm (0.039–0.059 in) long and the petals 0.7–1 mm (0.028–0.039 in) long. Flowering occurs in October and November, and the fruit is 2.5–2.8 mm (0.098–0.110 in) long.

== Taxonomy and naming ==
Stenanthemum limitatum was first formally described in 1995 by Barbara Lynette Rye in the journal Nuytsia from specimens collected by Charles Gardner on Mount Lesueur in 1946. The specific epithet (limitatum) means "enclosed within limits", referring to the restricted range of this species.

== Distribution and habitat ==
This species grows in heath and shrubland on laterite near Mount Lesueur in the Geraldton Sandplains bioregion of south-western Western Australia.

== Conservation status ==
Stenanthemum limitatum is listed as "Priority Two" by the Western Australian Government Department of Biodiversity, Conservation and Attractions, meaning that it is poorly known and from only one or a few locations.
