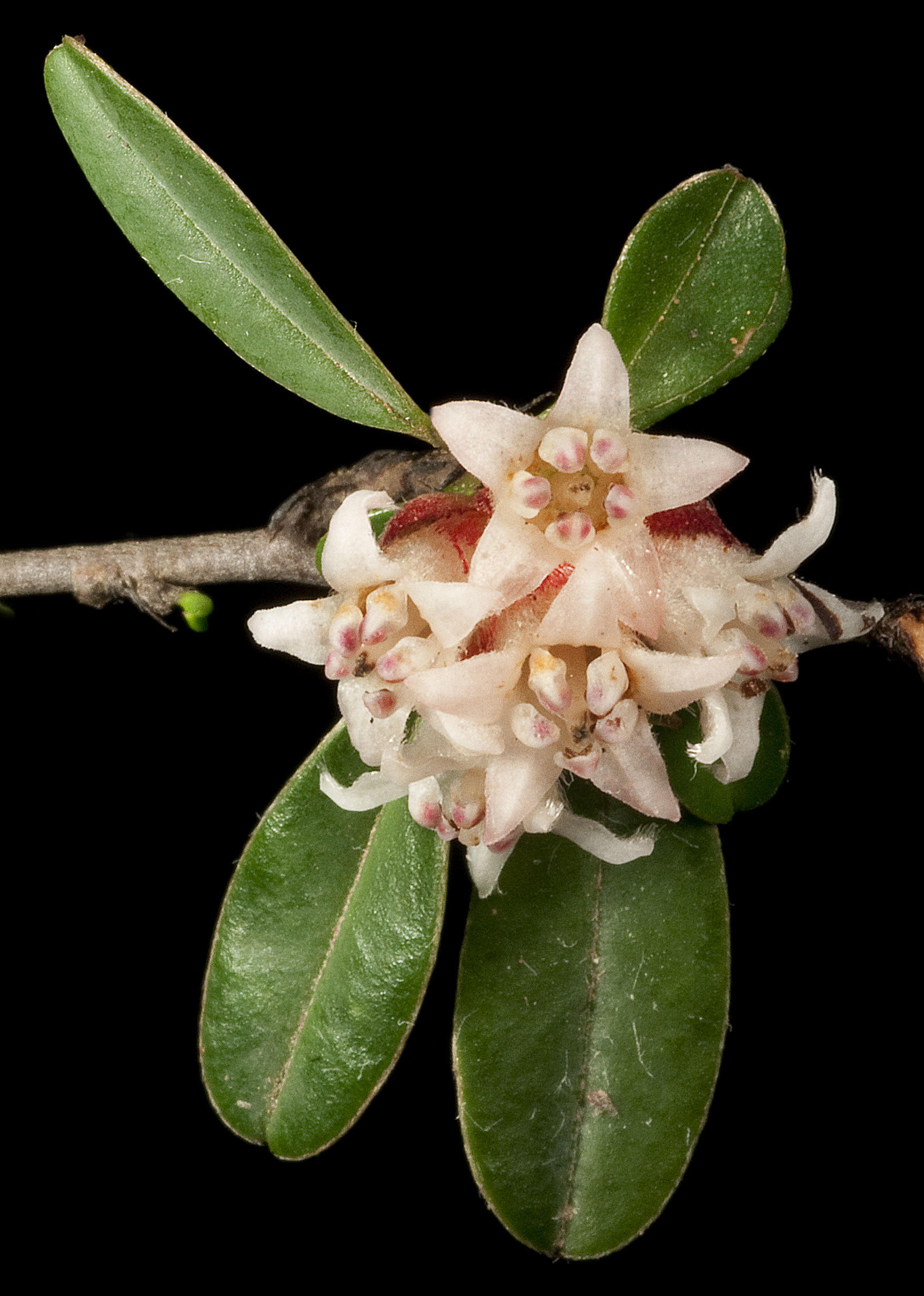

Scientific classification
- Kingdom: Plantae
- Clade: Tracheophytes
- Clade: Angiosperms
- Clade: Eudicots
- Clade: Rosids
- Order: Rosales
- Family: Rhamnaceae
- Genus: Stenanthemum
- Species: S. pomaderroides

Binomial name
- Stenanthemum pomaderroides (Reissek) Reissek

Synonyms
- Cryptandra pomaderroides Reissek; Solenandra pomaderrodes Kuntze orth. var.; Solenandra pomaderroides (Reissek) Kuntze

= Stenanthemum pomaderroides =

Species of flowering plant

Stenanthemum pomaderroides is a species of flowering plant in the family Rhamnaceae and is endemic to the southwest of Western Australia. It is an erect shrub with densely hairy young stems, egg-shaped leaves with the narrower end towards the base, and cream-coloured clusters of 10 to 30 tube-shaped flowers.

== Description ==
Stenanthemum pomaderroides is an erect shrub that typically grows to a height of 0.2–1.5 m (7.9 in – 4 ft 11.1 in), its young stems densely covered with rust-coloured hairs. Its leaves are egg-shaped with the narrower end towards the base, mostly 12–18 mm (0.47–0.71 in) long and 5–8 mm (0.20–0.31 in) wide on a petiole 2–4 mm (0.079–0.157 in) long with egg-shaped or triangular stipules 3–6 mm (0.12–0.24 in) long and free from each other. The upper surface of the leaves has star-shaped hairs or is glabrous, the lower surface with shaggy, greyish hairs. The flowers are cream-coloured and borne in clusters of 10 to 30, often with white floral leaves at the base. The floral tube is 2.2–4.5 mm (0.087–0.177 in) long and 1.0–1.5 mm (0.039–0.059 in) wide, the sepals 1.1–1.4 mm (0.043–0.055 in) long and the petals 0.7–0.8 mm (0.028–0.031 in) long. Flowering occurs from August to November, and the fruit is 2.8–3.2 mm (0.11–0.13 in) long.

== Taxonomy and naming ==
This species was first formally described in 1848 by Siegfried Reissek who gave it the name Cryptandra pomaderroides in Novarum Stirpium Decades. In 1858, Reissek changed the name to Stenanthemum pomaderroides in the journal Linnaea. The specific epithet (pomaderroides) means "pomaderris-like".

== Distribution and habitat ==
Stenanthemum pomaderroides grows in shrubland and woodland, usually in rocky places, between the Murchison River at Kalbarri and Wyalkatchem, in the Avon Wheatbelt and Geraldton Sandplains bioregions of south-western Western Australia.
