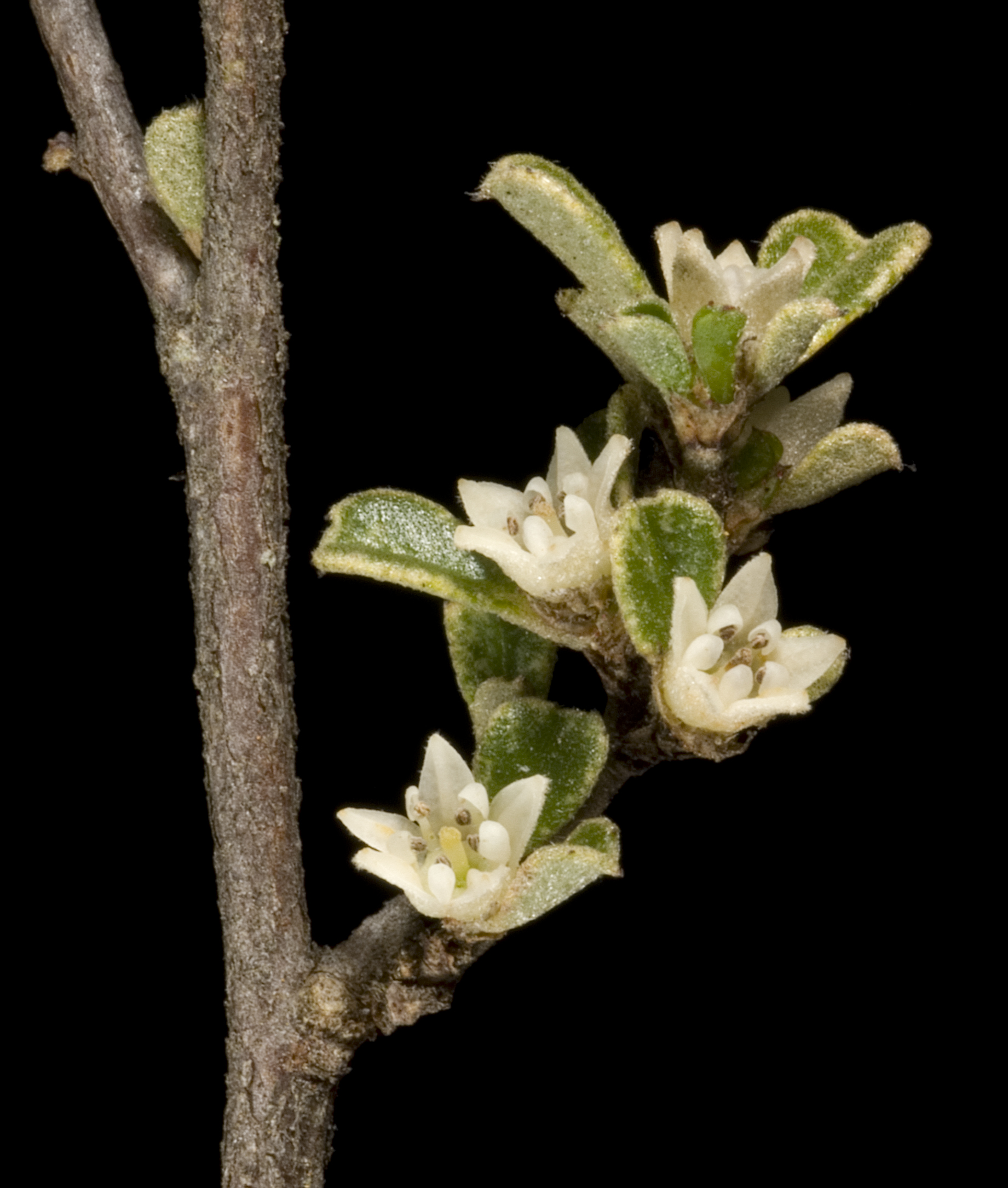

Scientific classification
- Kingdom: Plantae
- Clade: Tracheophytes
- Clade: Angiosperms
- Clade: Eudicots
- Clade: Rosids
- Order: Rosales
- Family: Rhamnaceae
- Genus: Stenanthemum
- Species: S. intricatum

Binomial name
- Stenanthemum intricatum Rye

= Stenanthemum intricatum =

Species of flowering plant

Stenanthemum intricatum is a species of flowering plant in the family Rhamnaceae and is endemic to the southwest of Western Australia. It is an erect to spreading, often wiry shrub with sparsely hairy young stems, egg-shaped to fan-shaped leaves and greyish, densely softly-hairy heads of white or cream-coloured flowers.

== Description ==
Stenanthemum intricatum is an erect to spreading, often wiry shrub that typically grows to a height of 5–80 cm (2.0–31.5 in), its young stems sparsely covered with grey or rust-coloured, star-shaped hairs. Its leaves are egg-shaped with the narrower end towards the base, to almost fan-shaped, mostly 2–4 mm (0.079–0.157 in) long and 1.5–4 mm (0.059–0.157 in) wide on a petiole 0.3–1 mm (0.012–0.039 in) long, with broadly triangular stipules 1.0–1.5 mm (0.039–0.059 in) long and joined together at the base. The tips of the leaves have three teeth, the upper surface is softly-hairy and the lower surface densely covered with greyish, star-shaped hairs. The flowers are white to cream-coloured, and densely covered with softly-hairy, greyish, star-shaped hairs. The floral tube is up to 0.2 mm (0.0079 in) long and 0.8–1 mm (0.031–0.039 in) wide, the sepals 0.8–1.2 mm (0.031–0.047 in) long and the petals 0.6–0.7 mm (0.024–0.028 in) long. Flowering occurs throughout the year, and the fruit is 2.0–2.5 mm (0.079–0.098 in) long.

== Taxonomy and naming ==
Stenanthemum intricatum was first formally described in 1995 by Barbara Lynette Rye in the journal Nuytsia from specimens collected near Kalbarri in 1968. The specific epithet (intricatum) means "entangled", referring to the branching pattern of this species.

== Distribution and habitat ==
This species grows in heath and shrubland between Kalbarri and Cunderdin in the Avon Wheatbelt, Esperance Plains, Geraldton Sandplains, Jarrah Forest, Mallee and Swan Coastal Plain bioregions of south-western Western Australia.

== Conservation status ==
Stenanthemum intricatum is listed as "not threatened" by the Government of Western Australia Department of Biodiversity, Conservation and Attractions.
