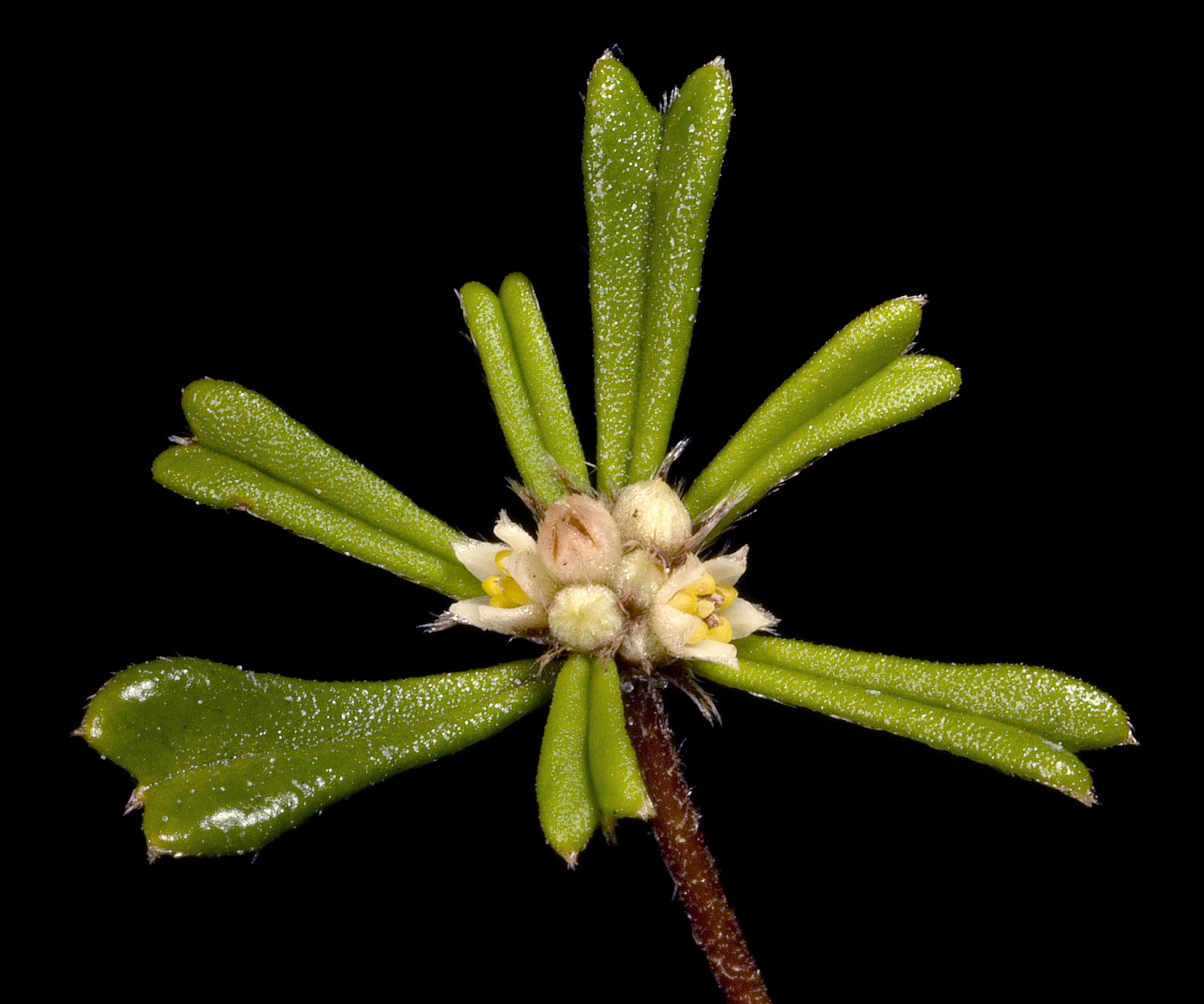

Scientific classification
- Kingdom: Plantae
- Clade: Tracheophytes
- Clade: Angiosperms
- Clade: Eudicots
- Clade: Rosids
- Order: Rosales
- Family: Rhamnaceae
- Genus: Stenanthemum
- Species: S. emarginatum

Binomial name
- Stenanthemum emarginatum (Benth.) Rye

= Stenanthemum emarginatum =

Species of flowering plant

Stenanthemum emarginatum is a species of flowering plant in the family Rhamnaceae and is endemic to the southwest of Western Australia. It is a spreading to prostrate shrub with sparsely hairy young stems, narrowly fan-shaped to linear leaves and densely, shaggy-hairy heads of white or cream-coloured flowers.

== Description ==
Stenanthemum emarginatum is a spreading to prostrate shrub that typically grows to a height of 5–10 cm (2.0–3.9 in), its young stems sparsely hairy. Its leaves are narrowly fan-shaped to linear, 4.5–11 mm (0.18–0.43 in) long and mostly 1.5–3.5 mm (0.059–0.138 in) wide on a petiole 0.5–1.5 mm (0.020–0.059 in) long, with triangular stipules 1.0–1.5 mm (0.039–0.059 in) long and joined together at the base. The upper surface of the leaves is glabrous and the lower surface is covered with shaggy, silvery hairs. The flowers are sparsely to densely covered with shaggy, greyish hairs. The floral tube is 0.3–0.5 mm (0.012–0.020 in) long and 0.5–0.7 mm (0.020–0.028 in) wide, the sepals 0.6–1 mm (0.024–0.039 in) long and the petals 0.5–0.6 mm (0.020–0.024 in) long. Flowering occurs in November and December, and the fruit is 1.8–2.2 mm (0.071–0.087 in) long.

== Taxonomy and naming ==
Stenanthemum emarginatum was first formally described in 1995 by Barbara Lynette Rye in the journal Nuytsia from specimens collected by Alex George near Ravensthorpe in 1960. The specific epithet (emarginatum) means "notched", referring to the leaves.

== Distribution and habitat ==
This species grows in shrubland and mallee-heath between Gingin and Hopetoun in the Avon Wheatbelt, Esperance Plains, Geraldton Sandplains, Jarrah Forest and Swan Coastal Plain bioregions of south-western Western Australia.

== Conservation status ==
Stenanthemum emarginatum is listed as "not threatened" by the Government of Western Australia Department of Biodiversity, Conservation and Attractions.
