= Stenanthemum centrale =

Scientific classification
- Kingdom: Plantae
- Clade: Tracheophytes
- Clade: Angiosperms
- Clade: Eudicots
- Clade: Rosids
- Order: Rosales
- Family: Rhamnaceae
- Genus: Stenanthemum
- Species: S. centrale

Binomial name
- Stenanthemum centrale K.R.Thiele

Species of flowering plant

Stenanthemum centrale is a species of flowering plant in the family Rhamnaceae and is endemic to the Northern Territory of Australia. It is a woody shrub with egg-shaped leaves, the narrower end towards the base and dense, yellowish heads of 10 to 40 tube-shaped flowers, sometimes with whitish floral leaves.

== Description ==
Stenanthemum centrale is a woody shrub that typically grows to a height of 1.5 m (4 ft 11 in), its young stems densely covered with soft, greyish hairs. Its leaves are egg-shaped to broadly egg-shaped, the narrower end towards the base, 10–15 mm (0.39–0.59 in) long and 5–8 mm (0.20–0.31 in) wide on a petiole 1.5–3.5 mm (0.059–0.138 in) long, with narrowly triangular stipules 2.5–4.5 mm (0.098–0.177 in) long at the base. Both surfaces of the leaves are densely covered with shaggy, greyish, star-shaped hairs. The flowers are borne in groups of 10 to 40, 6–10 mm (0.24–0.39 in) wide with hairy, egg-shaped to triangular bracts 3–4 mm (0.12–0.16 in) long and sometimes surrounded by whitish floral leaves. The flowers are sessile, the floral tube 2.8–3.5 mm (0.11–0.14 in) long and 0.8–1.5 mm (0.031–0.059 in) wide. The sepals are densely hairy and 1.2–1.5 mm (0.047–0.059 in) long, the petals 0.8–1.1 mm (0.031–0.043 in) long. Flowering occurs throughout the year, and the fruit is about 3.5 mm (0.14 in) long.

== Taxonomy and naming ==
Stenanthemum centrale was first formally described in 2007 by Kevin Thiele in the Journal of the Adelaide Botanic Gardens from specimens collected in 1995 by David Albrecht in Finke Gorge National Park. The specific epithet (centrale) means "central point", referring to distribution of the species, in Central Australia.

== Distribution and habitat ==
This species occurs in the Finke Gorge National Park and Owen Springs Reserve in the MacDonnell Ranges of the Northern Territory, where it grows on slopes and ridges and in rocky gorges.
