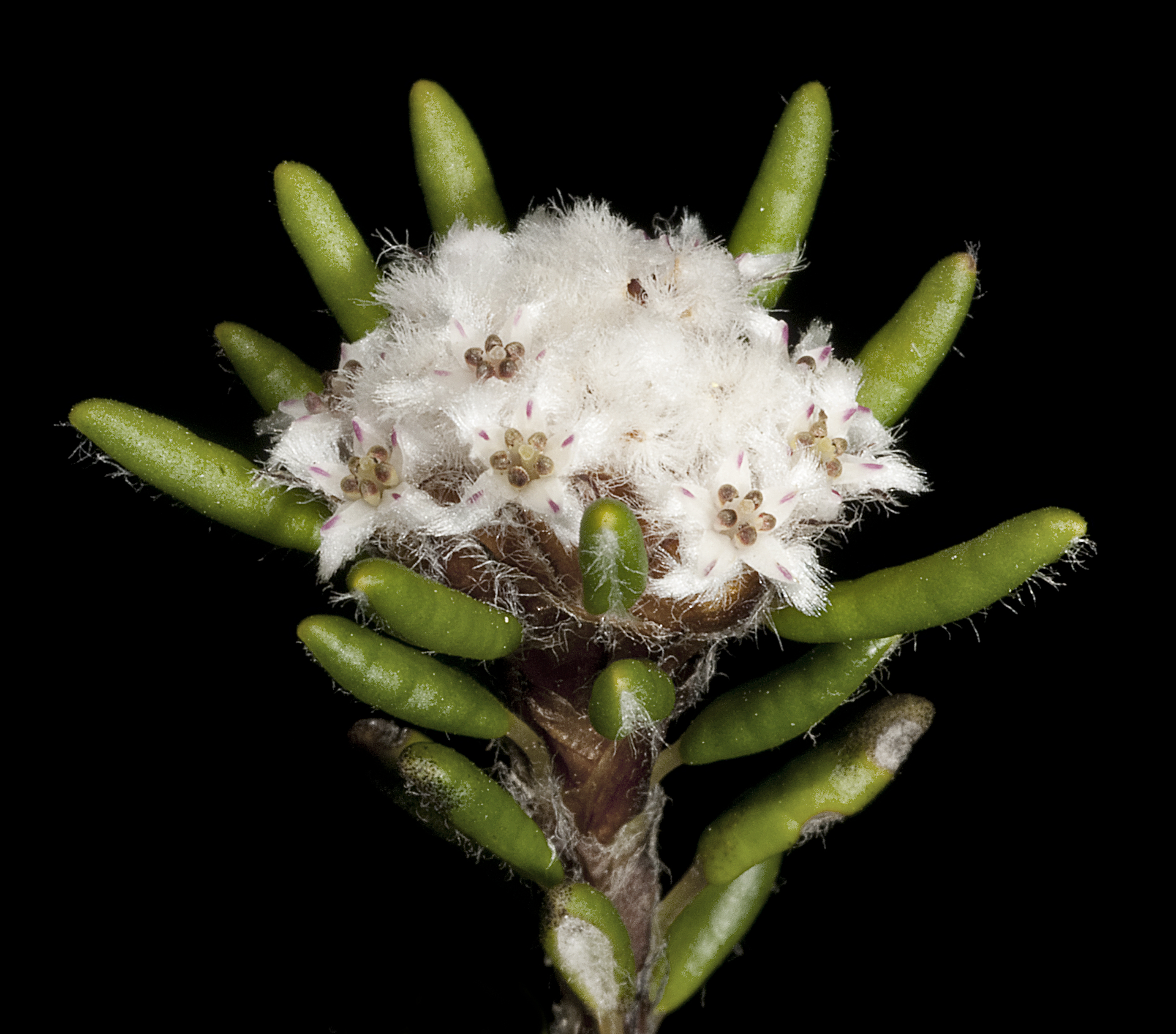

Scientific classification
- Kingdom: Plantae
- Clade: Tracheophytes
- Clade: Angiosperms
- Clade: Eudicots
- Clade: Rosids
- Order: Rosales
- Family: Rhamnaceae
- Genus: Stenanthemum
- Species: S. humile

Binomial name
- Stenanthemum humile Benth.

= Stenanthemum humile =

Species of flowering plant

Stenanthemum humile is a species of flowering plant in the family Rhamnaceae and is endemic to the southwest of Western Australia. It is a low, erect perennial herb or shrub with white, woolly-hairy young stems, linear to narrowly elliptic leaves and densely, woolly-hairy heads of tube-shaped flowers.

== Description ==
Stenanthemum humile is an upright, perennial herb or shrub that typically grows to a height of 5–20 cm (2.0–7.9 in) and has its young stems covered with white, woolly hairs. Its leaves are usually linear, sometimes narrowly egg-shaped to narrowly elliptic, mostly 6–10 mm (0.24–0.39 in) long and 1–2 mm (0.039–0.079 in) wide on a petiole 1.5–3.5 mm (0.059–0.138 in) long. There are egg-shaped or rectangular stipules 4–6 mm (0.16–0.24 in) long forming a sheath around the stems. The edges of the leaves are rolled under. The flowers are arranged in heads of up to fifty, 10–15 mm (0.39–0.59 in) wide. The floral tube is 2.5–5 mm (0.098–0.197 in) long, 0.8–1.5 mm (0.031–0.059 in) wide and woolly hairy, the sepals 0.7–1.0 mm (0.028–0.039 in) long and densely woolly-hairy, and the petals 0.5–0.6 mm (0.020–0.024 in) long. Flowering occurs from August to November, and the fruit is 2.0–2.4 mm (0.079–0.094 in) long.

== Taxonomy and naming ==
Stenanthemum humile was first formally described in 1863 by George Bentham in Flora Australiensis from specimens collected by James Drummond between the Moore and Murchison Rivers. The specific epithet (humile) means "low" or "small".

== Distribution and habitat ==
This species grows in low heath, shrubland or woodland on sand, mainly between Three Springs and Regans Ford with an outlier near Perth, in the Avon Wheatbelt, Geraldton Sandplains, Jarrah Forest and Swan Coastal Plain bioregions of south-western Western Australia.

== Conservation status ==
Stenanthemum humile is listed as "not threatened" by the Government of Western Australia Department of Biodiversity, Conservation and Attractions.
