= Stenanthemum argenteum =

Scientific classification
- Kingdom: Plantae
- Clade: Tracheophytes
- Clade: Angiosperms
- Clade: Eudicots
- Clade: Rosids
- Order: Rosales
- Family: Rhamnaceae
- Genus: Stenanthemum
- Species: S. argenteum

Binomial name
- Stenanthemum argenteum A.R.Bean

Species of flowering plant

Stenanthemum argenteum is a species of flowering plant in the family Rhamnaceae and is endemic to a restricted part of Queensland. It is a shrub with hairy branches, lance-shaped to egg-shaped leaves with the narrower end towards the base, and heads of about seven hairy white, tube-shaped flowers.

== Description ==
Stenanthemum argenteum is a shrub that typically grows to a height of 50–75 cm (20–30 in) and has its branches covered with silvery hairs. Its leaves are lance-shaped to egg-shaped with the narrower end towards the base, 6–16 mm (0.24–0.63 in) long and 2.0–4.9 mm (0.079–0.193 in) wide on a petiole 2–3 mm (0.079–0.118 in) long, with narrowly triangular stipules 2.0–3.1 mm (0.079–0.122 in) long at the base. The upper surface of the leaves is glabrous and the lower surface is densely covered with silvery hairs pressed against the surface. The flowers are borne in groups of 5 to 10 about 5 mm (0.20 in) wide, surrounded by 3 floral bracts and one or two densely hairy floral leaves. The floral tube is 2.0–2.5 mm (0.079–0.098 in) long, the sepals white to creamy-white and joined to form a hairy, cylindrical to urn-shaped tube 2.5–3.0 mm (0.098–0.118 in) long mostly obscured by bracts. The petals are white, form a hood over the stamens and protrude 1.1–1.4 mm (0.043–0.055 in) beyond the sepal tube. Flowering has been observed in May and September.

== Taxonomy and naming ==
Stenanthemum argenteum was first formally described in 2004 by Anthony Bean in the journal Austrobaileya from specimens collected on Mount Mulligan in 1985. The specific epithet (argenteum) means "silvery", referring to the hairs on the branchlets and leaves.

== Distribution and habitat ==
This species grows steep sandstone hills and cliffs in woodland and is only known from Mount Mulligan and Mount Janet in north Queensland.

== Conservation status ==
Stenanthemum argenteum is listed as "vulnerable" under the Queensland Government Nature Conservation Act 1992.
