= Ilex brasiliensis =

Scientific classification
- Kingdom: Plantae
- Clade: Tracheophytes
- Clade: Angiosperms
- Clade: Eudicots
- Clade: Asterids
- Order: Aquifoliales
- Family: Aquifoliaceae
- Genus: Ilex
- Species: I. brasiliensis

Binomial name
- Ilex brasiliensis (Spreng.) Loes.

Synonyms
- Ilex pubiflora Reissek

Species of holly

Ilex brasiliensis, the Brazilian holly, is a species of the genus Ilex in the family Aquifoliaceae.

It is native to Brazil, Paraguay and northern Argentina, and is typically found in Cerrado vegetation.

It is occasionally used as an adulterant in maté.
