= Stenanthemum arens =

Scientific classification
- Kingdom: Plantae
- Clade: Tracheophytes
- Clade: Angiosperms
- Clade: Eudicots
- Clade: Rosids
- Order: Rosales
- Family: Rhamnaceae
- Genus: Stenanthemum
- Species: S. arens

Binomial name
- Stenanthemum arens K.R.Thiele

Species of flowering plant

Stenanthemum arens is a species of flowering plant in the family Rhamnaceae and is endemic to South Australia. It is a twiggy shrub with broadly egg-shaped to almost circular leaves and heads of 10 to 20 silky-hairy white, tube-shaped flowers, usually with whitish floral leaves.

== Description ==
Stenanthemum arens is a twiggy shrub, its young stems covered with soft or shaggy, greyish or rust-coloured hairs. Its leaves are broadly egg-shaped with the narrower end towards the base, or almost round, 4–7 mm (0.16–0.28 in) long and wide on a petiole 1–2 mm (0.039–0.079 in) long, with narrowly triangular to linear stipules 2–4 mm (0.079–0.157 in) long at the base. Both surfaces of the leaves are covered with greyish, star-shaped hairs. The leaves are often folded lengthwise. The flowers are borne in groups of 10 to 20 up to 10 mm (0.39 in) wide with bracts 1.5–2.5 mm (0.059–0.098 in) long and surrounded by whitish flower leaves. Each flower is on a shaggy-hair pedicel up to 0.2 mm (0.0079 in) long. The floral tube is 0.9–1.2 mm (0.035–0.047 in) long and 1.2–1.5 mm (0.047–0.059 in) wide, the sepals 1.2–1.4 mm (0.047–0.055 in) long and the petals 0.7–0.8 mm (0.028–0.031 in) long. Flowering has been observed in July, and the fruit is 2.2–3.0 mm (0.087–0.118 in) long.

== Taxonomy and naming ==
Stenanthemum arens was first formally described in 2007 by Kevin Thiele in the Journal of the Adelaide Botanic Gardens from specimens collected by John Carrick in 1969. The specific epithet (arens) means "dry or parched", referring to the appearance of the plant as well as its habitat.

== Distribution and habitat ==
This species grows on rocky hills in the north-west Gawler Ranges of South Australia.
