= Siegfried Reissek =

Austrian naturalist and botanist (1819–1871)

Siegfried Reissek (11 April 1819 in Teschen – 9 November 1871 in Vienna) was an Austrian naturalist and botanist who specialized in spermatophytes. He is known for his studies involving plant anatomy and histology.

From 1837 to 1841 he was a student at the University of Vienna. He worked as assistant curator at the Royal Botanical Collection in Vienna between 1845 and 1867, when he was appointed head curator; and from 1848 was a member of the Vienna Academy of Sciences. He circumscribed numerous plant taxa, including the genus Stenanthemum (family Rhamnaceae). The plant genus Reissekia from Brazil (in the family Rhamnaceae) commemorates his name.

== Publications ==
- Über die selbständige Entwickelung der Pollenzelle zur keimtragenden Pflanze, 1844 – On the self-development of the pollen cell in germinating plants.
- Die Fasergewebe des Leines. des Hanfes, der Nessel und Baumwolle, 1851 – The fibrous tissue of rope, hemp, nettle and cotton.
- Untersuchungen über die Fäulniss der Mohrrüben, 1852 – Studies on the putrefaction of carrots.
- Alphitomyces schroetteri (1856).
- Die Palmen. Eine physiognomisch-culturhistorische Skizze, 1861 – The palms.
- Celastrineae, Ilicineae et Rhamneae, 1861. In: Flora Brasiliensis.
- Die Vegetation von Südasien, 1864 – Vegetation of southern Asia.
- "Correspondence : Reissek (Siegfried) and Engelmann (George)", 1876.
