= Schizocarp =

Dry fruit composed of multiple segments

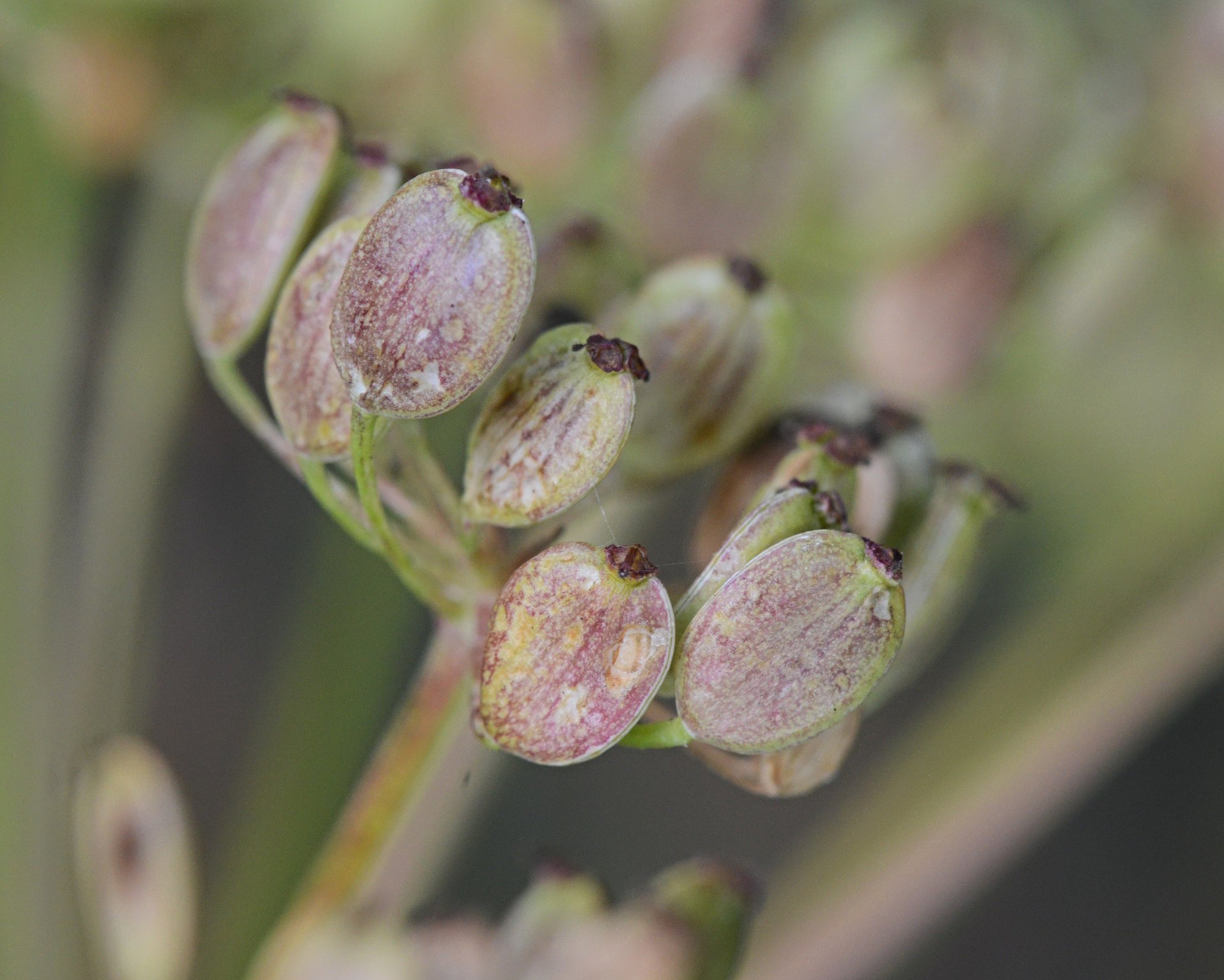
The indehiscent (remaining closed) schizocarps of the parsnip (Pastinaca sativa), like that of the carrot, will split into two parts

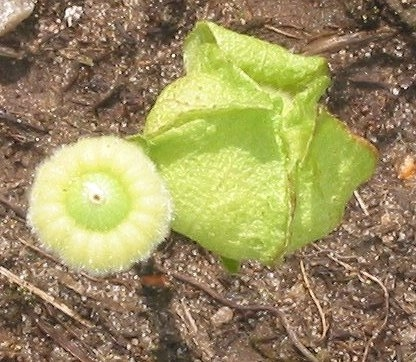
The indehiscent schizocarp of musk mallow (Malva moschata) will later split into segments called mericarps

A schizocarp /ˈskɪzəkɑːrp/ is a dry fruit that, when mature, splits up into mericarps.

There are different definitions:

- Any dry fruit composed of multiple carpels that separate.

Under this definition the mericarps can contain one or more seeds (the mericarps of Abutilon have two or more seeds) and each mericarp can be either:
- Indehiscent (remaining closed), such as in the carrot and other Umbelliferae or in members of the genus Malva, or
- Dehiscent (splitting open to release the seed), for example members of the genus Geranium. This is similar to what happens with a capsule, but with an extra stage. (In Abutilon, the mericarp is sometimes only partially dehiscent and does not release the seed.)

- Any fruit that separates into indehiscent one-seeded segments, such as a loment, Malva, Malvastrum, and Sida.

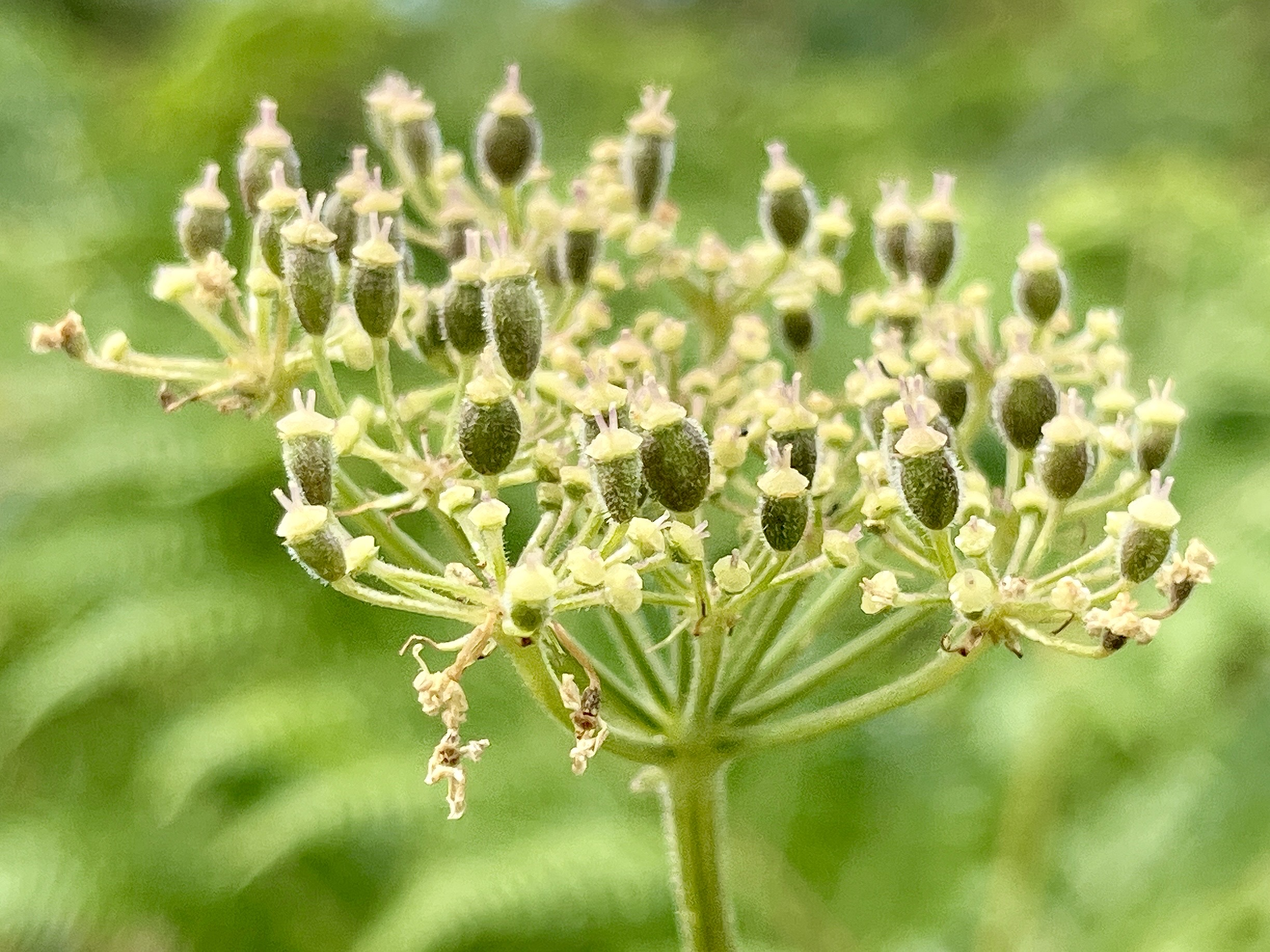
Schizocarps of Heracleum sphondylium in early development

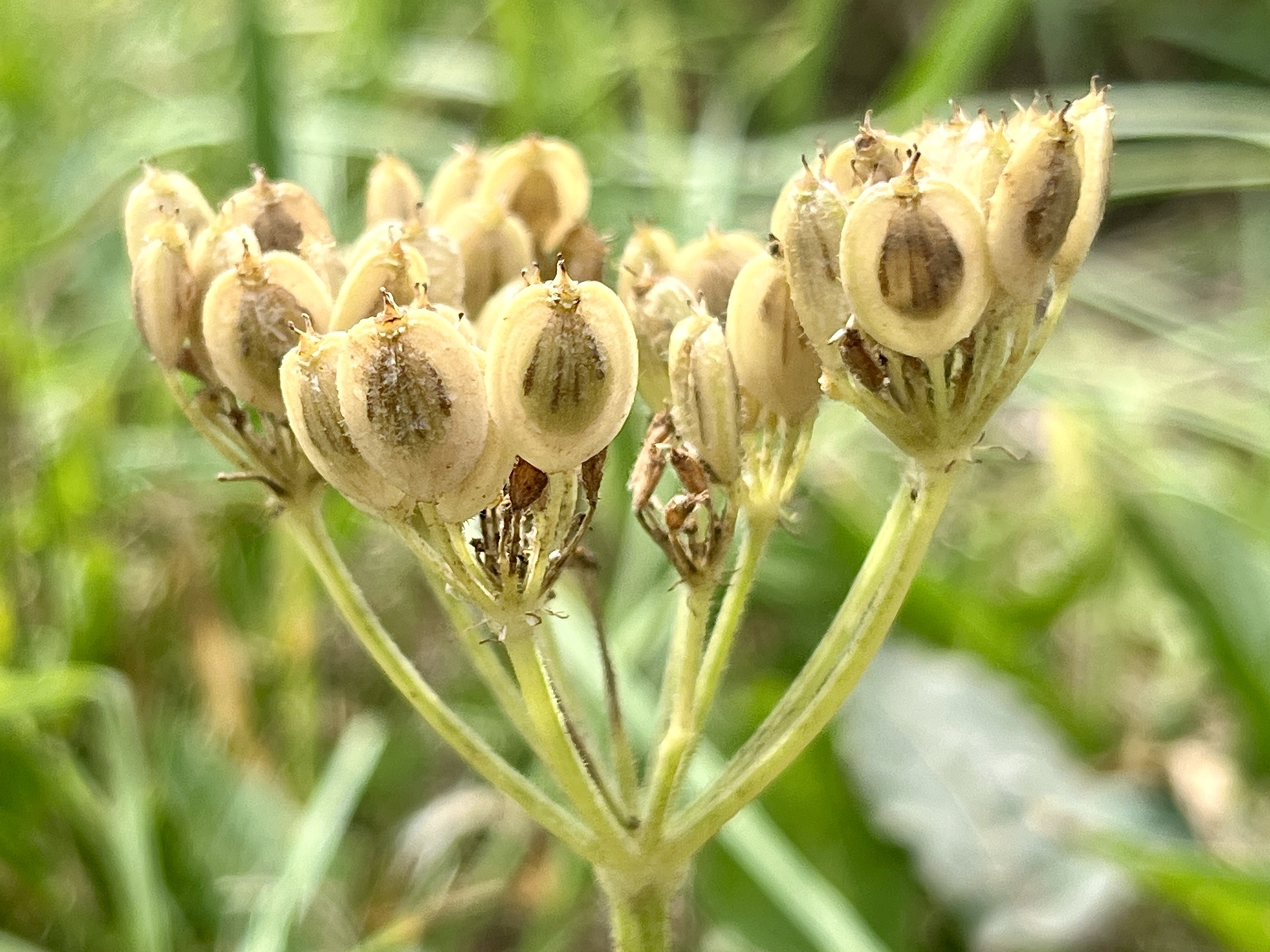
Schizocarps of Heracleum sphondylium in mid to late development
