= Barbara Lynette Rye =

Australian botanist

Barbara Lynette Rye is an Australian botanist born in 1952.

Barbara Rye has been associated with the Western Australian Herbarium, where her work as a taxonomist has been the source of many new descriptions of plants. The number of taxa recorded as described by women authors is historically very low, of the terrestrial plant species this amount is around three percent, yet in analysis published in 2019 Rye is amongst the ten most prolific women taxonomists.

Born in Perth, Western Australia, she spent her childhood investigating the local flora and fauna of the Southwest Australia region, a biodiversity hotspot, and later began studies at the University of Western Australia. Barbara Rye entered the fields of zoology and botany, taking a special interest in genetics and evolutionary biology. The first description of a new species was a Darwinia, a genus of the family Myrtaceae that Rye investigated for her doctoral thesis, separating Darwinia capitellata from a more widely distributed group.

Rye is co-author or major contributor to several standard works of Australian botany, Flora of the Perth Region, Flora of the Kimberley, and in assembling treatments of the Thymelaeaceae for the Flora of Australia series. By early 2019, Barbara Rye was the acknowledged author of over two hundred and thirty new species.

== Selected publications ==
- Kellermann, Jürgen; Rye, Barbara L.; Thiele, Kevin R. (2006). "Polianthion, a new genus of Rhamnaceae (Pomaderreae) from Western Australia and Queensland". Australian Systematic Botany. 19 (2): 169. doi:10.1071/SB05027. ISSN 1030-1887.
- Kellermann, Jürgen; Rye, B.; Thiele, Kevin (2007). "Blackallia, Serichonus and Papistylus: three closely related genera of Rhamnaceae (Pomaderreae) from south-western Australia". Nuytsia. 16: 299–316.
- Kellermann, Jürgen; Rye, Barbara L.; Thiele, Kevin R. (January 2008). "Nomenclatural Notes, Typifications and Name Changes in Trymalium (Rhamnaceae: Pomaderreae)". Transactions of the Royal Society of South Australia. 132 (1): 18–28. doi:10.1080/03721426.2008.10887089. ISSN 0372-1426. S2CID 83795692.
- Kellermann, Jürgen; Rye, Barbara (2008). "Typification of three species of Cryptandra from Western Australia and a range extension for C. myriantha (Rhamnaceae: Pomaderreae)". Journal of the Adelaide Botanic Gardens. 22: 31–32.
- Rye, B.L.; Trudgen, M.E. (2008). "Seorsus, a new Gondwanan genus of Myrtaceae with a disjunct distribution in Borneo and Australia". Nuytsia. 18: 235–257..
- Rye, Barbara Lynette (2009). "An interim key to the Western Australian tribes and genera of Myrtaceae" (PDF). Nuytsia. 19 (2): 313–323.
