= Boegoe =

Boegoe is a word of Khoikhoi origin, which may refer to a number of South African plants, fungi or a mineral, that were used in traditional preparations. Most Boegoe plants are typified by a strong aromatic odour due to volatile oils released by glands in the leaves. The name primarily denotes those plant species of which the stems, powdered leaves or volatile oils are employed in herbalism.

== Members of the Rutaceae ==
- Agathosma species (syn. Barosma, Diosma), Rutaceae,
  - including A. betulina and A. crenulata, marketed as buchu,
- A. serratifolia and Empleurum unicapsulare, Rutaceae, used as substitutes
- Thamnosma africana, Sandboegoe, Rutaceae, used in Namibia as a substitute
- Coleonema species, Rutaceae

== Individual plant species ==
- Croton gratissimus, Koranaboegoe, Euphorbiaceae, used inland as a substitute
- Ocimum fruticulosum, Boesmansboegoe, Lamiaceae
- Osteospermum breviradiatum, Lemoenboegoe, Asteroideae
- Pteronia onobromoides, Boegoebos, Asteraceae, which has succulent aromatic leaves

== Fungi ==
- Phellorina inquinans, Haasboegoe, a non-aromatic fungus
- Podaxon carcinomalis, Wolfboegoe, a non-aromatic fungus

== Non-vegetable ==
- Hyraceum, known as Haasboegoe or Klipboegoe, and used medicinally by the Namaqua

== Other ==
- Garlic chives, known as Buchu in Korean, though linguistically unrelated

Note: Various similar names are recorded, including Boechoe, Boekoe, Boggoa, Boochoo, Bookoo, Bouchou, Bugu, Buccho, Bucchuu, Bucco, Buchu, iBuchu, Bucku or Buka Leaves, though the names in bold print are best known.
