= Diosma haelkraalensis =

Scientific classification
- Kingdom: Plantae
- Clade: Tracheophytes
- Clade: Angiosperms
- Clade: Eudicots
- Clade: Rosids
- Order: Sapindales
- Family: Rutaceae
- Genus: Diosma
- Species: D. haelkraalensis

Binomial name
- Diosma haelkraalensis I.Williams

Species of rare plant from South Africa

Diosma haelkraalensis, or Hagelkraal's diosma, is a rare species of plant endemic to the southwestern Cape Provinces of South Africa.

== Description ==
These shrubs grow 10–30 cm (0.33–0.98 ft) tall. The tough branches have rough bark and are bent at all angles. The branchlets are densely covered in small, hairless leaves which are oppositely arranged. They have glands towards the midrib and margins. The slightly transparent margins curve back the center of the leaf. Small white flowers are present between April and September. They occur singly or in pairs at the ends of branches.

== Distribution ==
Hagelkraal's diosma grows in crevices in the limestone of the Bredasdorp geological formation. It only occurs on an approximately 2.5 km (1.6 mi) stretch of the mountain range between Pearly Beach and Hagelkraal.

== Ecology ==
Flowers are pollinated by insects. The seeds are dispersed by ants, which take them underground.

== Chemical compounds ==
The leaves of Hagelkraal's diosma has been described as having the same scent as true buchus. Chemical analysis has shown that the leaves contain the same sulphurous chemical (8-mercaptop-methan-3-one) that produces this scent in Agathosoma species. This is the first time that this compound has been found in a different genus. This compound is in high demand from the flavour and fragrance industries which use small quantities to enhance flavours and fragrances. Hagelkraal's diosma was found to have higher concentrations of the compound than Agathosma crenulata and Agathosma betulina - the buchu species which are currently used for commercial production, although the overall yield was lower. while it is not currently used, this plant could be cultivated and utilised by the fragrance and flavour industries.

== Conservation ==
This species is considered to be critically rare.
