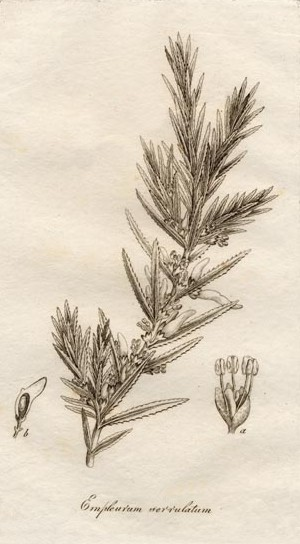

Scientific classification
- Kingdom: Plantae
- Clade: Tracheophytes
- Clade: Angiosperms
- Clade: Eudicots
- Clade: Rosids
- Order: Sapindales
- Family: Rutaceae
- Genus: Empleurum
- Species: E. unicapsulare

Binomial name
- Empleurum unicapsulare (L.f.) Skeels

Synonyms
- Empleurum serrulatum Sol. ex Aiton.; Diosma unicapsularis L.f.

= Empleurum unicapsulare =

Species of flowering plant

Empleurum unicapsulare or false buchu is a South African shrub of the family Rutaceae and occurs from the southwestern districts of the Cape Province to the Uitenhage area.

Buchu in commerce is generally accepted as the dried leaves of Agathosma betulina (Thunberg) Bartling et Wendland, or of Agathosma crenulata (Linne) Hooker, or of Agathosma serratifolia (Curtis) Willdenow. These dried leaves are often adulterated with leaves of False Buchu, which has a more acrid taste. Buchu is a flavourant used in brandy and tea.
