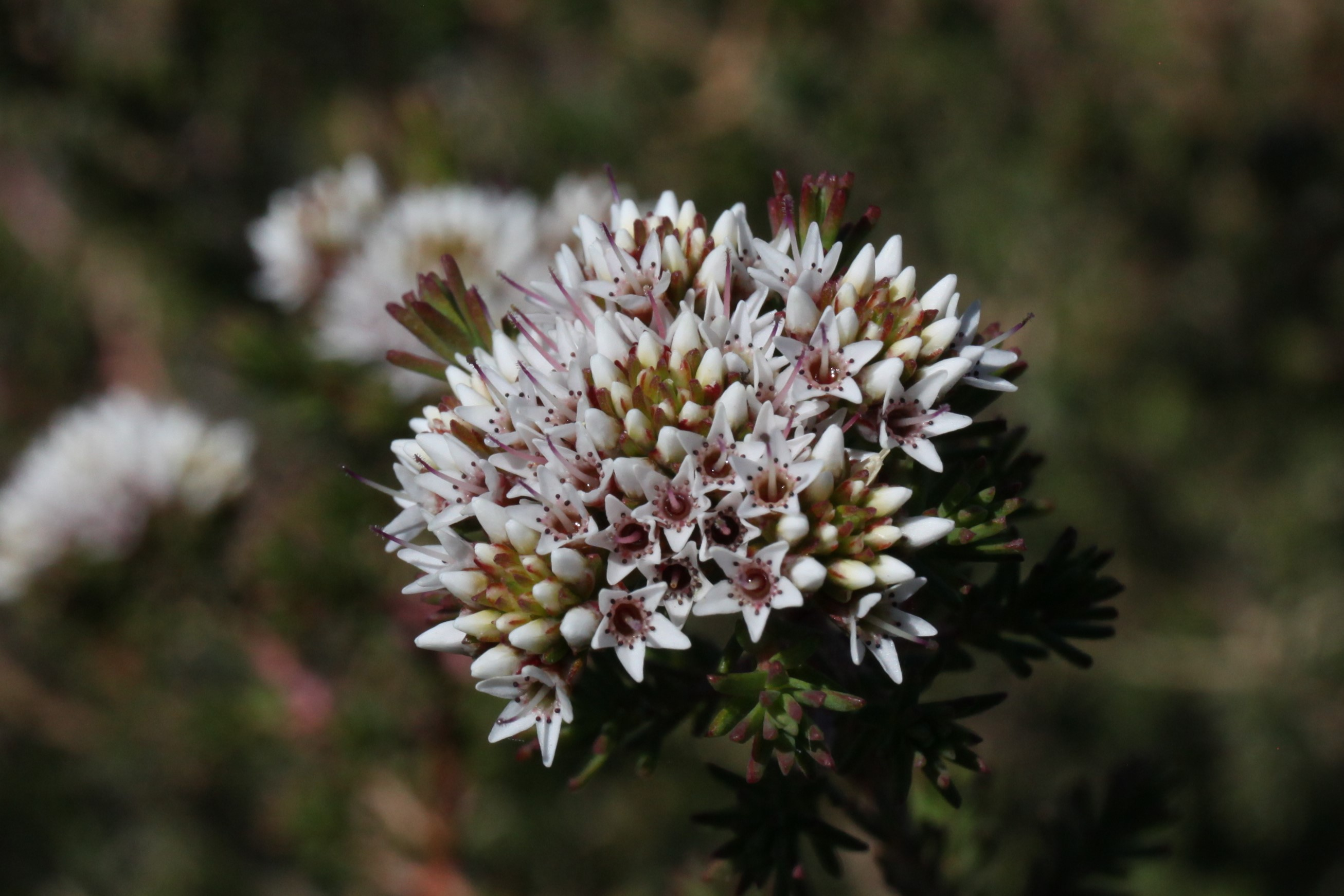

Scientific classification
- Kingdom: Plantae
- Clade: Tracheophytes
- Clade: Angiosperms
- Clade: Eudicots
- Clade: Rosids
- Order: Myrtales
- Family: Myrtaceae
- Genus: Darwinia
- Species: D. capitellata

Binomial name
- Darwinia capitellata Rye
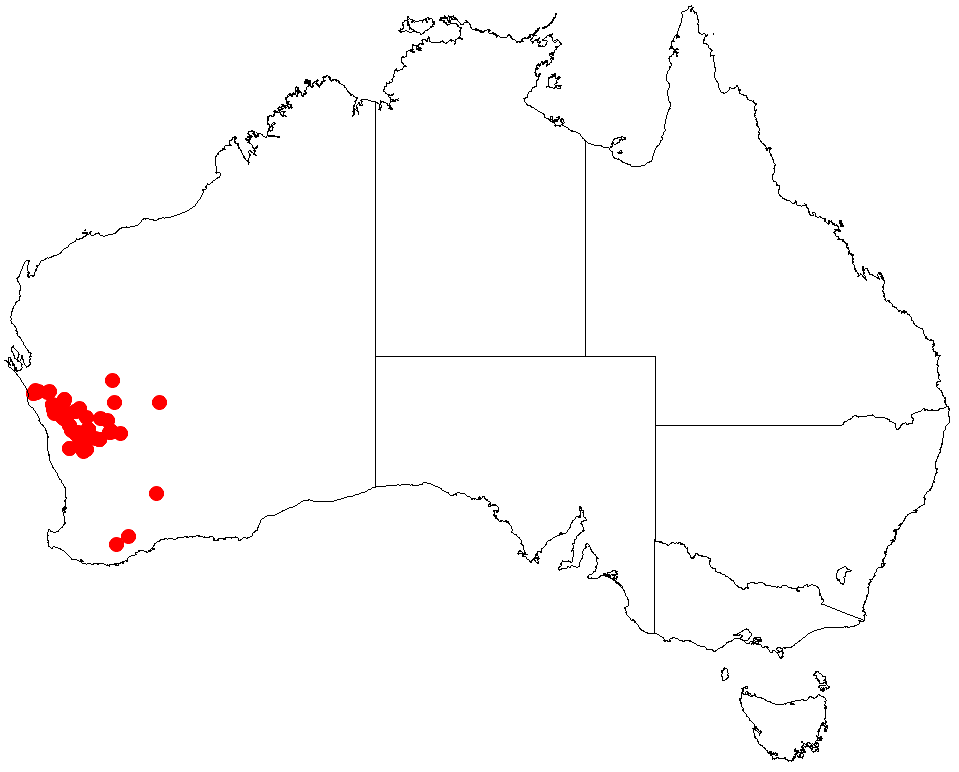
- Occurrence data from AVH

= Darwinia capitellata =

Species of flowering plant

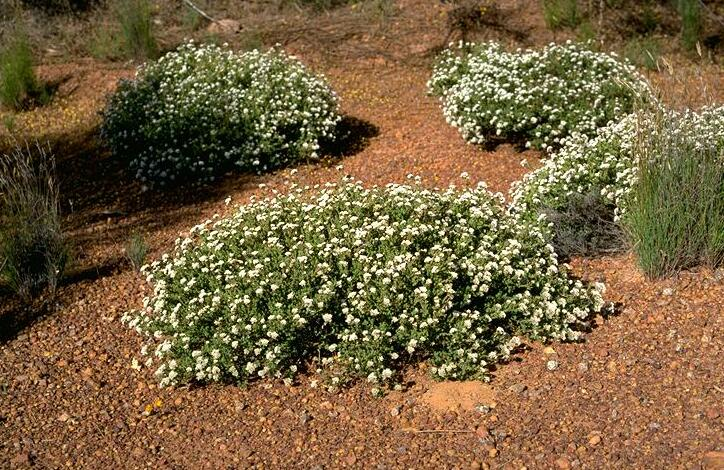
Habit near Tardun

Darwinia capitellata is a plant in the myrtle family Myrtaceae and is endemic to the south-west of Western Australia. It is a bushy, many-branched shrub, very similar to Darwinia diosmoides but differs in the arrangement of its flowers, its more branched habit, prominent oil glands on the younger stems and its thinner, paper-like bracteoles. It was first discovered as a separate species when specimens of it were found to have a larger chromosome number than specimens of D. diosmoides.

== Description ==
Darwinia capitellata is a many-branched shrub growing to 1.0 metre (3 ft) high with its leaves crowded near the ends of the branches. The younger branches have prominent oil glands. The leaves have distinct oil glands, a distinct stalk and are 2.5–4.5 millimetres (0.1–0.2 in) long and 0.5–1.0 millimetre (0.02–0.04 in) wide.

The flowers are arranged near the ends of the branches in heads that are more corymb-like than those of other species of Darwinia. The two bracteoles around each flower are 2.3–4.0 millimetres (0.09–0.2 in) long, 0.5–1.0 millimetre (0.02–0.04 in) wide, thin and papery and fall off as the flower matures. The petals are egg-shaped, white 1.8–2.3 millimetres (0.07–0.09 in) long and enclose the 10 stamens, staminodes and the lower part of the style. The style which protrudes from the rest of the flower is 4–6 millimetres (0.16–0.24 in) long and has a band of hairs near its tip. Flowering occurs between August and November and is followed by the fruit which is a non-fleshy nut containing a seed 1 millimetre (0.04 in) long.

== Taxonomy ==
The first formal of Darwinia capitellata was published in 1983 in Nuytsia by Barbara Rye, the first publication of a new species by the prolific taxonomist. The type specimen was collected by Charles Gardner near Paynes Find. It was first recognised as a distinct species when some specimens were found to have 12 chromosomes, rather than the usual 7 or 14 for Darwinia diosmoides, evidence that was later confirmed by comparison of their morphology. The specific epithet (capitellata) is from the Latin word capitatus with the diminutive -ell-, hence meaning "forming a small head", referring to the arrangement of the flowers in this species.

== Distribution and habitat ==
This darwinia grows on sandplains, sometimes on sandstone rock between Kalbarri National Park, Perenjori and Sandstone in the Avon Wheatbelt, Geraldton Sandplains, Mallee, Murchison and Yalgoo biogeographic regions.

== Conservation ==
Darwinia capitellata is classified as "not threatened" by the Western Australian Government Department of Parks and Wildlife.
