= Breath of Heaven =

Breath of Heaven may refer to: Dolls

- "Breath of Heaven (Mary's Song)", a 1992 song by Amy Grant, later covered by Jessica Simpson in 2004
- Breath of Heaven: A Holiday Collection, a 1997 jazz album by Grover Washington Jr.
- "Breath of Heaven", a 2021 cover by father daughter duo Mat and Savanna Shaw on their album "The Joy of Christmas"
- Coleonema pulchellum, or breath of heaven, a shrub endemic to South Africa
