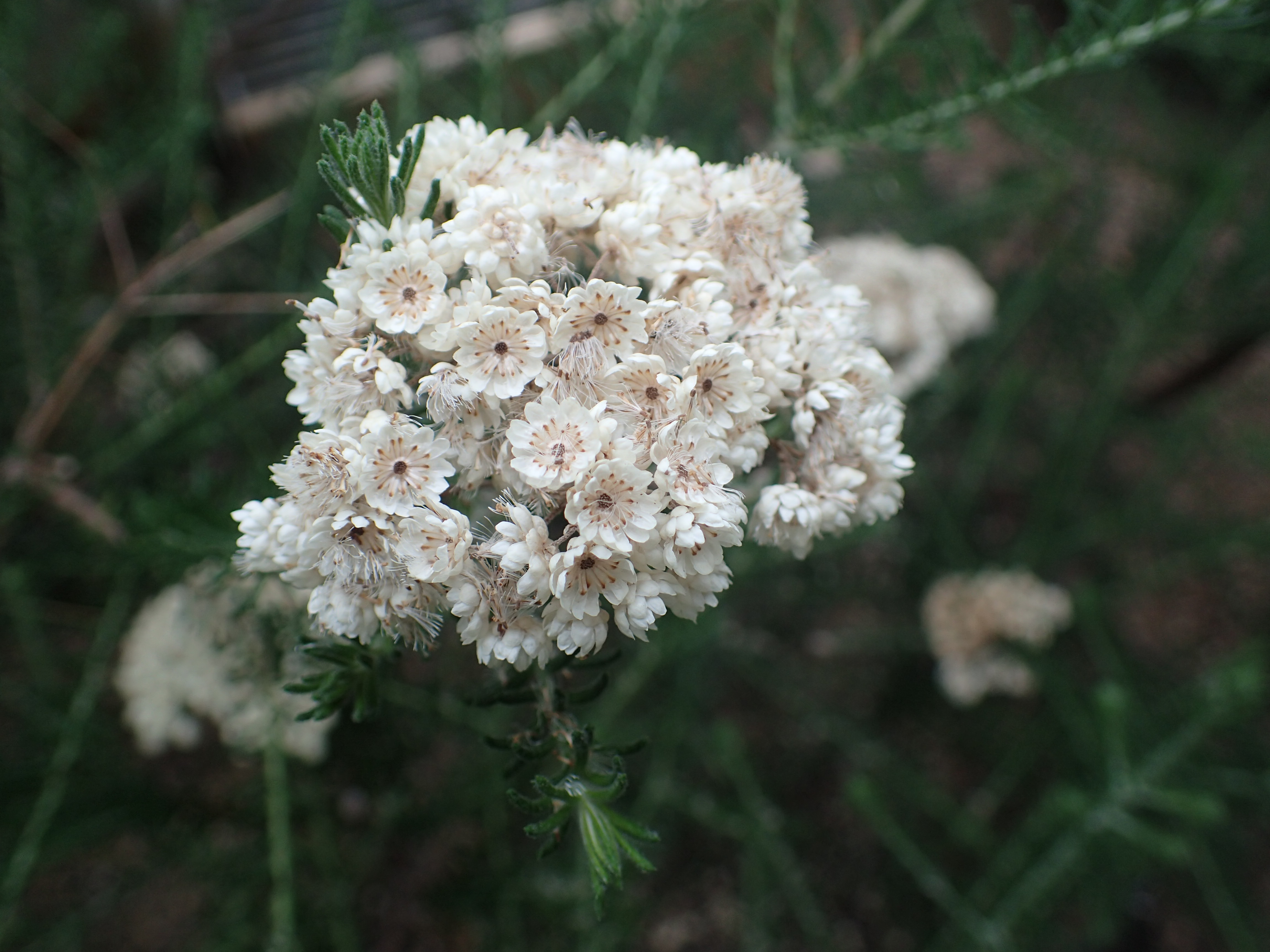
- Ozothamnus diosmifolius flowers

Scientific classification
- Kingdom: Plantae
- Clade: Tracheophytes
- Clade: Angiosperms
- Clade: Eudicots
- Clade: Asterids
- Order: Asterales
- Family: Asteraceae
- Genus: Ozothamnus
- Species: O. diosmifolius

Binomial name
- Ozothamnus diosmifolius (Vent.) DC.

Synonyms
- Gnaphalium diosmaefolium Vent. orth. var.; Gnaphalium diosmifolium Vent.; Helichrysum diosmifolium (Vent.) Sweet; Ozothamnus diosmaefolia DC. orth. var.

= Ozothamnus diosmifolius =

Rice flower

Species of shrub

Ozothamnus diosmifolius is an erect, woody shrub in the family Asteraceae and is endemic to eastern Australia. Common names for this species include rice flower, white dogwood, pill flower and sago bush. It has dense heads of small white "flowers" and is often used in floral arrangements.

== Description ==
Ozothamnus diosmifolius is an erect, much-branched, woody shrub which usually grows to a height of 2 m (7 ft) but sometimes much taller. Its branches are rough and densely covered with short hairs. The leaves are sharp-smelling, usually 10–15 mm (0.4–0.6 in) long and 1–2 mm (0.04–0.08 in) wide but inland forms have leaves to 3.5 mm (0.1 in) wide. As with other plants in the family Asteraceae, each "flower" is actually a head of flowers, each 2–3 mm (0.08–0.1 in) in diameter. In this species, the "flowers" are themselves arranged in corymbs, the corymbs in branching heads containing from a few to hundreds of individual "flowers". The white or pinkish coloration is due to the papery ray florets around individual "flowers".

== Taxonomy and naming ==
Rice flower was first formally described in 1804 by Étienne Pierre Ventenat who gave it the name Gnaphalium diosmifolium and published the description in Jardin de la Malmaison. In 1838, Augustin Pyramus de Candolle changed the name to Ozothamnus diosmifolius. The specific epithet (diosmifolius) is a reference to the similarity of the leaves of this species and those of Diosma. The common names "rice flower" and "sago bush" refer to the appearance of the flowers in bud.

== Distribution and habitat ==
Ozothamnus diosmifolius is widespread on the coast, tablelands and western slopes of New South Wales and Queensland north from Eden to Wide Bay. It grows in heath and on rainforest margins, often on ridges.

== Ecology ==
The time of day of pollen release is different from that of stigma exposure, increasing the chances of cross-pollination.

== Cultivation ==
Prior to the mid-1980s, rice flower was extensively harvested from the wild for the cut flower trade. Following research on the species, commercial cultivation commenced in 1990 and by 1999 there were about 100 growers and exports, mainly to Japan, had increased to about 600,000 stems.

=== Gallery ===
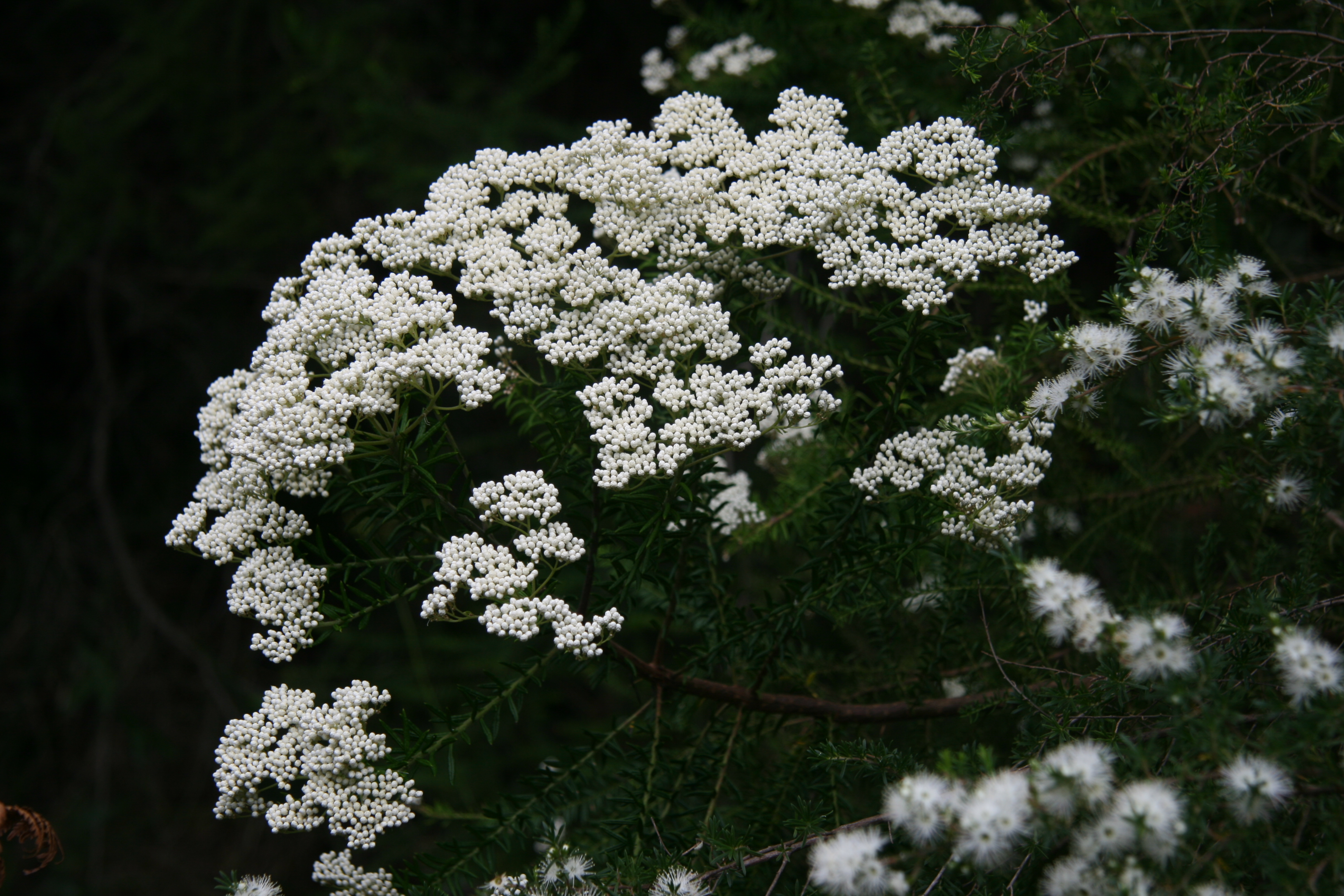
O. diosmifolius buds

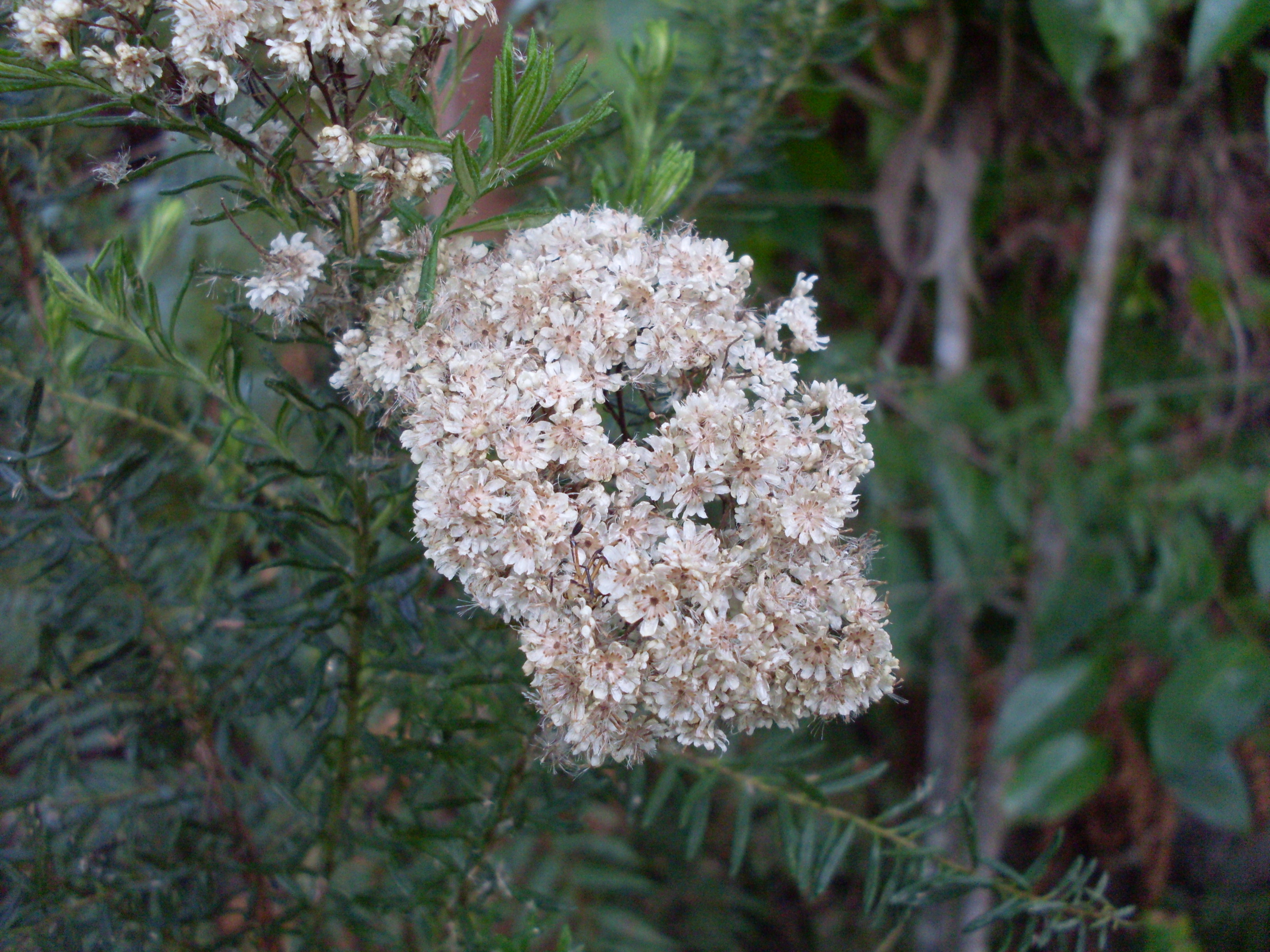
leaves and flowers

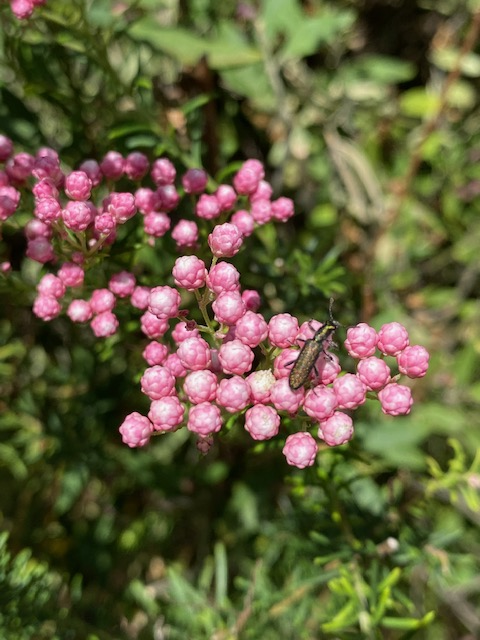
pink form
