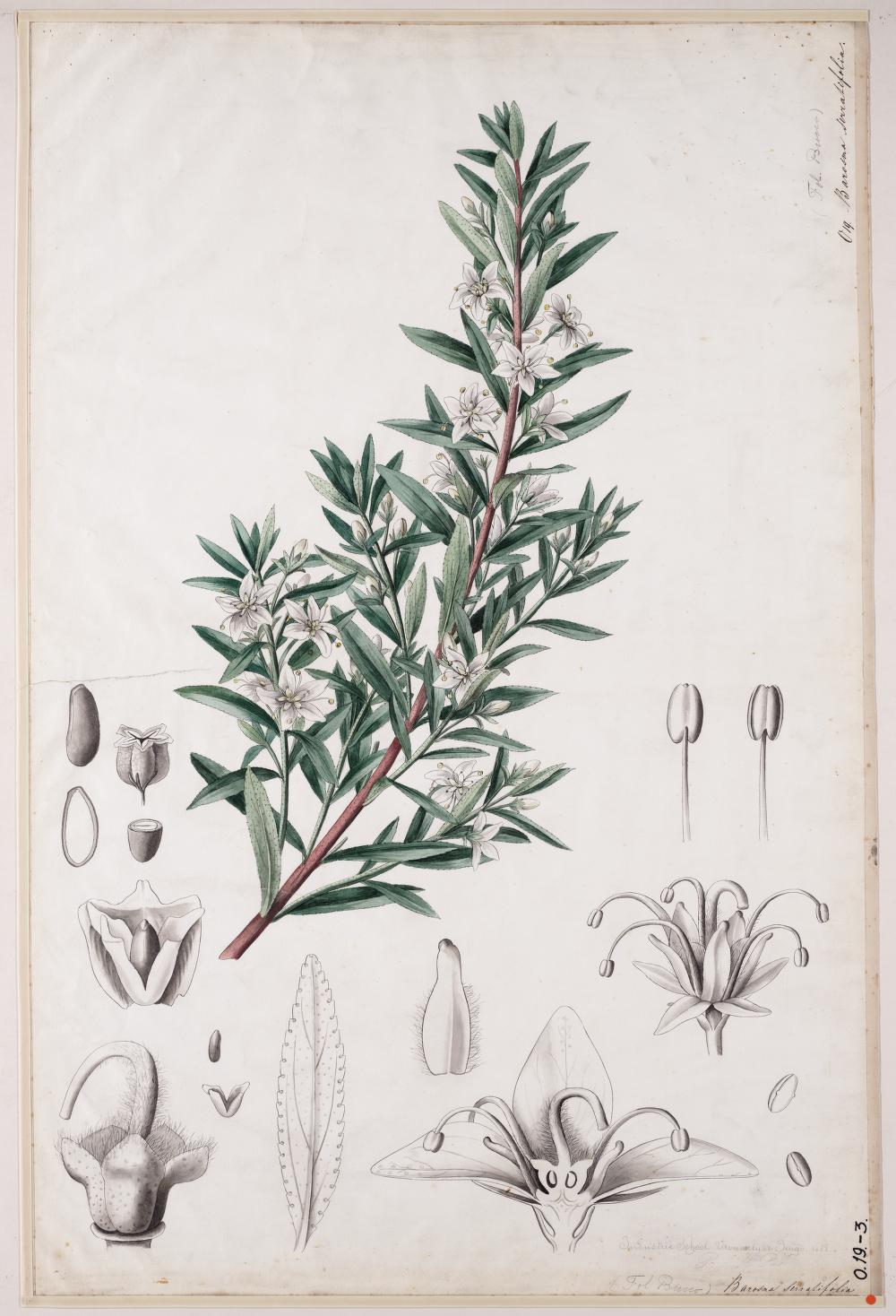

Scientific classification
- Kingdom: Plantae
- Clade: Tracheophytes
- Clade: Angiosperms
- Clade: Eudicots
- Clade: Rosids
- Order: Sapindales
- Family: Rutaceae
- Genus: Agathosma
- Species: A. serratifolia

Binomial name
- Agathosma serratifolia (Curtis) Spreeth

Synonyms
- Barosma serratifolia (Curtis) Willd.; Diosma serratifolia Curtis

= Agathosma serratifolia =

Species of flowering plant

Agathosma serratifolia, known as longleaf buchu or long buchu, is an erect, South African shrub, belonging to the citrus family Rutaceae. It is one of about 135 species mainly occurring in the south-western Cape Province. There, it is found on mountain slopes, wooded ravines, and valleys. The leaves are simple, ovoid, slightly serrated, and 0.5–3.5 cm long. In April and May, the plant produces 5-petalled flowers. 'Agathosma' = 'good smell', 'serratifolia' = 'serrate leaved'.

This species is strongly aromatic, and is gathered for medicinal use. The name Buchu is from the Khoikhoi word for the plant meaning "dusting powder". The Hottentots used an infusion of the dried leaves as a diuretic and cure for urinary tract disorders and pulverised the fragrant rue-like leaves to powder their bodies and act as an insect deterrent. In the 19th century the leaves were introduced into Europe. The leaves are used to add to the aroma and taste of liqueurs, wines and brandies. The leaves contain rutin, mucilage, volatile oils such as limonene and diosphenol (or barosma camphor) also menthone, quercetin, hesperidin, alpha-pinene, calcium, iron, magnesium, manganese, phosphorus, potassium, selenium, silicon, zinc, vitamin B_{1}, B_{2}, B_{3} and vitamin C.

== See also ==
- Empleurum unicapsulare
- Agathosma betulina
- Agathosma crenulata
