= P-Mentha-8-thiol-3-one =

p-Mentha-8-thiol-3-one

Names
- IUPAC name 5-methyl-2-(2-sulfanylpropan-2-yl)cyclohexan-1-one

Identifiers
CAS Number	38462-22-5
3D model (JSmol)	Interactive image
ChEBI	CHEBI:173523
ChEMBL	ChEMBL3183829
ChemSpider	55833
ECHA InfoCard	100.049.031
EC Number	253-953-1
PubChem CID	61982
UNII	9BM9FFW27E
CompTox Dashboard (EPA)	DTXSID2047195
- InChI: InChI=1S/C10H18OS/c1-7-4-5-8(9(11)6-7)10(2,3)12/h7-8,12H,4-6H2,1-3H3 Key: RVOKNSFEAOYULQ-UHFFFAOYSA-N
- SMILES: CC1CCC(C(=O)C1)C(C)(C)S

Properties
Chemical formula	C_{10}H_{18}OS
Molar mass	186.31 g·mol^{−1}
- Except where otherwise noted, data are given for materials in their standard state (at 25 °C [77 °F], 100 kPa). Infobox references

p-Mentha-8-thiol-3-one is an organosulfur compound with the chemical formula C_{10}H_{18}OS. It is notable for its potent aroma, reminiscent of blackcurrant or cat urine. Its presence in Sauvignon blanc is appreciated by wine connoisseurs, and indicates a high quality vintage. It occurs naturally in buchu leaves.
