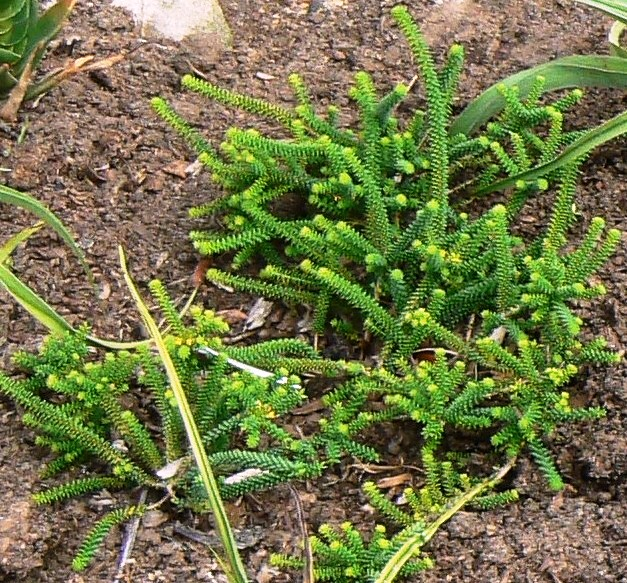

Scientific classification
- Kingdom: Plantae
- Clade: Tracheophytes
- Clade: Angiosperms
- Clade: Eudicots
- Clade: Rosids
- Order: Sapindales
- Family: Rutaceae
- Genus: Agathosma
- Species: A. gonaquensis

Binomial name
- Agathosma gonaquensis Eckl. & Zeyh., 1835

= Agathosma gonaquensis =

Species of flowering plant

Agathosma gonaquensis, commonly known as Gonaqua buchu, is a species of plant in the family Rutaceae. Its habitat is restricted to a tiny area of the Eastern Cape, South Africa. According to the South African National Biodiversity Institute, it is critically endangered.

The Gonaqua buchu used to be common around Port Elizabeth, South Africa. It grew in the coastal grasslands and fynbos that surrounded the town. Unfortunately, massive urban sprawl has covered its natural habitat, and it now survives in only two tiny (and fragmented) populations. These last patches are now threatened by rapidly spreading alien invasive plants.

In appearance, this plant is low-lying, compact, rounded and spreading. It produces masses of white flowers, and the natural oils within its leaves produce a pleasant fragrance when the foliage is crushed or handled. It is used in local traditional medicine to make a tea to treat colds and hay fever.

Grown in gardens, it is actually remarkably tough and waterwise. Once established, it withstands both drought and frost. With its striking white flowers and its tiny, dense, symmetrical foliage, it makes a very attractive plant for coastal gardens.
