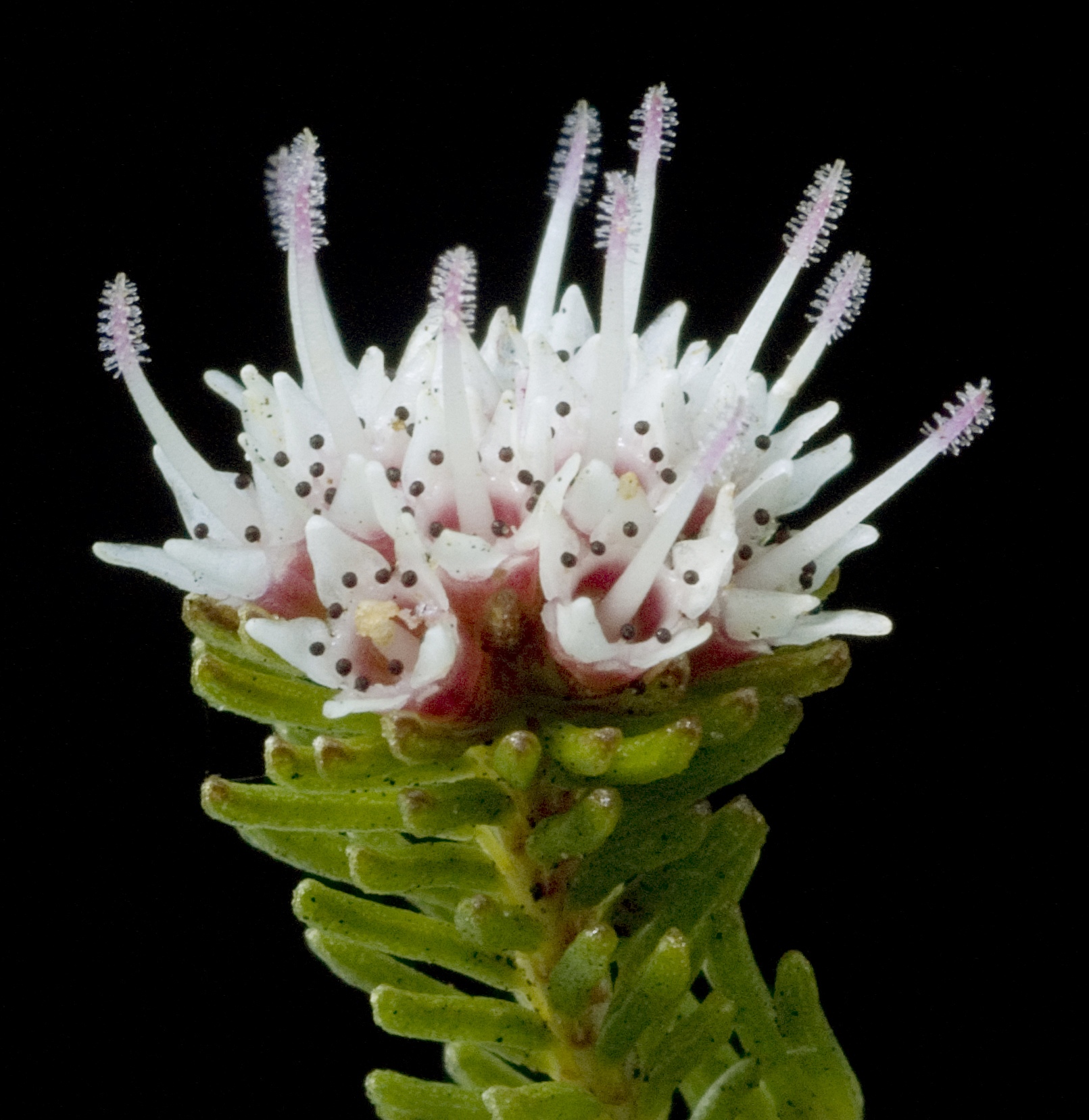

Scientific classification
- Kingdom: Plantae
- Clade: Tracheophytes
- Clade: Angiosperms
- Clade: Eudicots
- Clade: Rosids
- Order: Myrtales
- Family: Myrtaceae
- Genus: Darwinia
- Species: D. diosmoides

Binomial name
- Darwinia diosmoides (DC.) Benth.
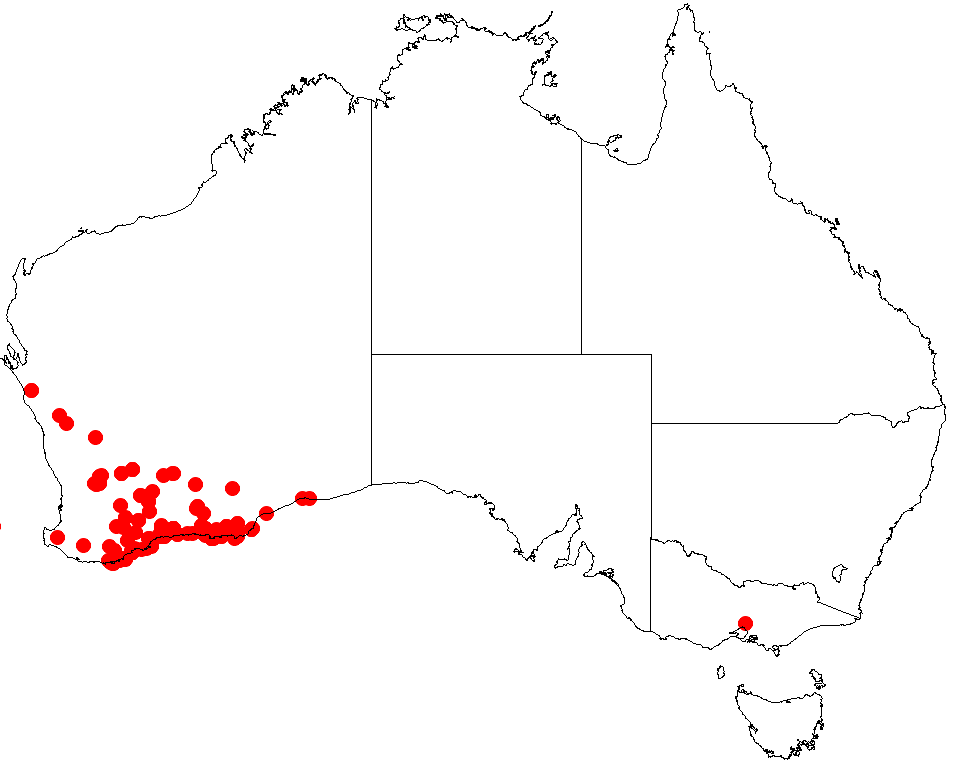
- Occurrence data from AVH

Synonyms
- Genetyllis affinis Turcz.; Genetyllis diosmoides DC.

= Darwinia diosmoides =

Species of flowering plant

Darwinia diosmoides is a species of flowering plant in the myrtle family Myrtaceae and is endemic to the south-west of Western Australia. It is a dense, erect shrub with linear leaves and more or less spherical heads of white flowers.

== Description ==
Darwinia diosmoides is a dense, erect shrub that typically grows to a height of 0.3–1.2 m (1 ft 0 in – 3 ft 11 in). Its leaves are linear to more or less cylindrical, mostly 2–5 mm (0.079–0.197 in) long. The flowers are arranged in compact, more or less spherical heads 6–8.5 mm (0.24–0.33 in) in diameter, with oblong bracteoles shorter than the sepals. The sepals are about 3 mm (0.12 in) long and joined at the base with five small, scale-like lobes, the petals white and about 1.6 mm (0.063 in) long with the style extended beyond the petals.

== Taxonomy ==
This species was formally described in 1828 by Swiss botanist Augustin Pyramus de Candolle who gave it the name Genetyllis diosmoides in his Prodromus Systematis Naturalis Regni Vegetabilis. In 1865, George Bentham changed the name to Darwinia diosmoides in the Journal of the Linnean Society, Botany. The specific epithet (diosmoides) means "Diosma-like".

== Distribution and habitat ==
Darwinia diosmoides grows on granite outcrops, on hillsides, near salt lakes and on sand dunes in the Avon Wheatbelt, Esperance Plains, Jarrah Forest, Mallee and Warren bioregions of south-western Western Australia.

== Conservation status ==
This darwinia is listed as "not threatened" by the Western Australian Government Department of Biodiversity, Conservation and Attractions.
