= Agathosma elegans =

Scientific classification
- Kingdom: Plantae
- Clade: Tracheophytes
- Clade: Angiosperms
- Clade: Eudicots
- Clade: Rosids
- Order: Sapindales
- Family: Rutaceae
- Genus: Agathosma
- Species: A. elegans

Binomial name
- Agathosma elegans Cham.

Synonyms
- Hartogia elegans Kuntze; Glandulifolia pubescens Kuntze; Agathosma pubescens Sond.

Species of flowering plant

Agathosma elegans is a plant species in the genus Agathosma found in South Africa (Cape of Good Hope).
