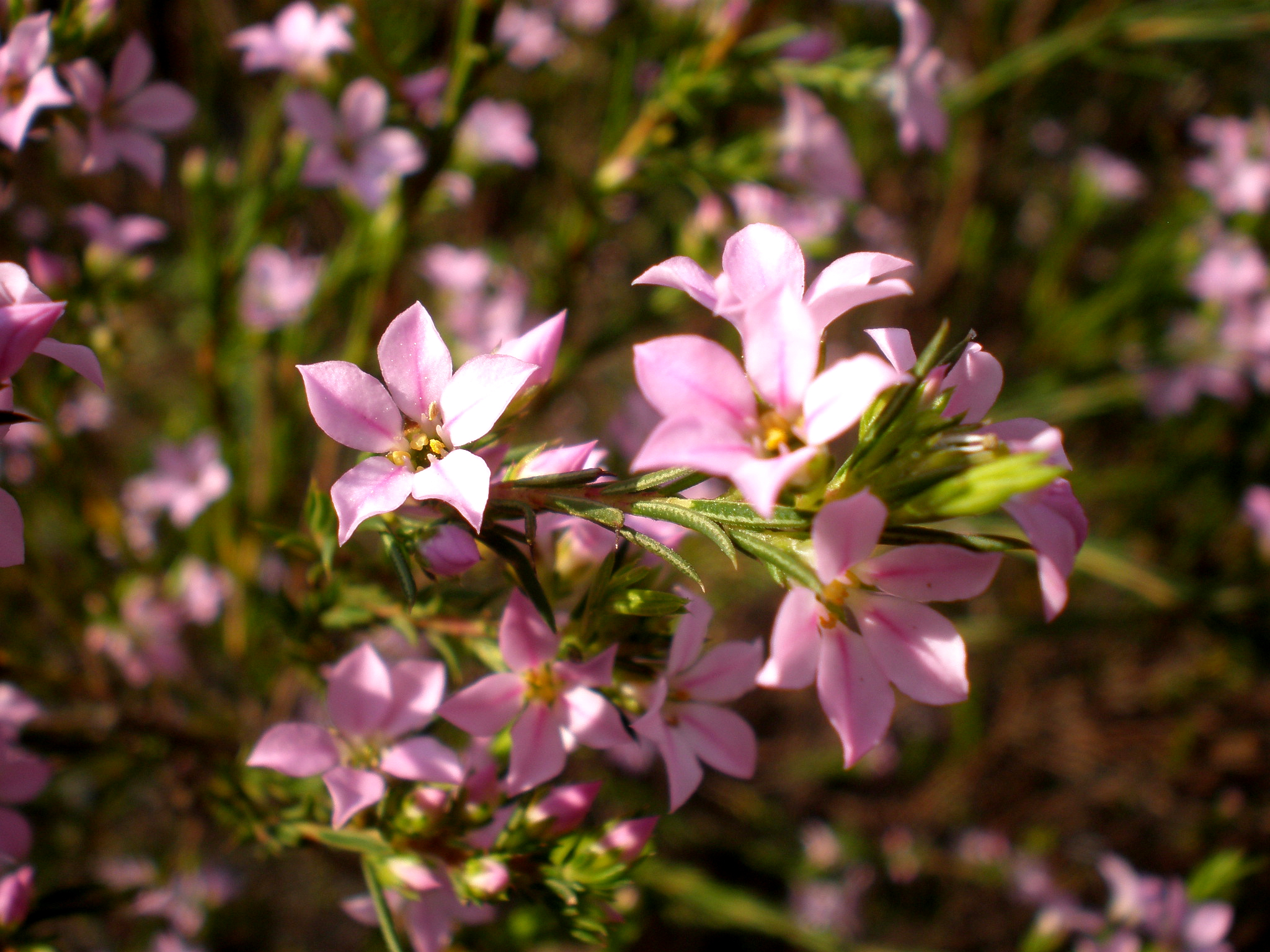

Scientific classification
- Kingdom: Plantae
- Clade: Tracheophytes
- Clade: Angiosperms
- Clade: Eudicots
- Clade: Rosids
- Order: Sapindales
- Family: Rutaceae
- Genus: Coleonema
- Species: C. pulchellum

Binomial name
- Coleonema pulchellum I.Williams

Synonyms
- Coleonema filiforme A.Juss.

= Coleonema pulchellum =

Species of flowering plant

Coleonema pulchellum, commonly known as confetti bush, buchu, diosma or breath of heaven, is a shrub which is endemic to the Cape Provinces of South Africa.

== Description ==
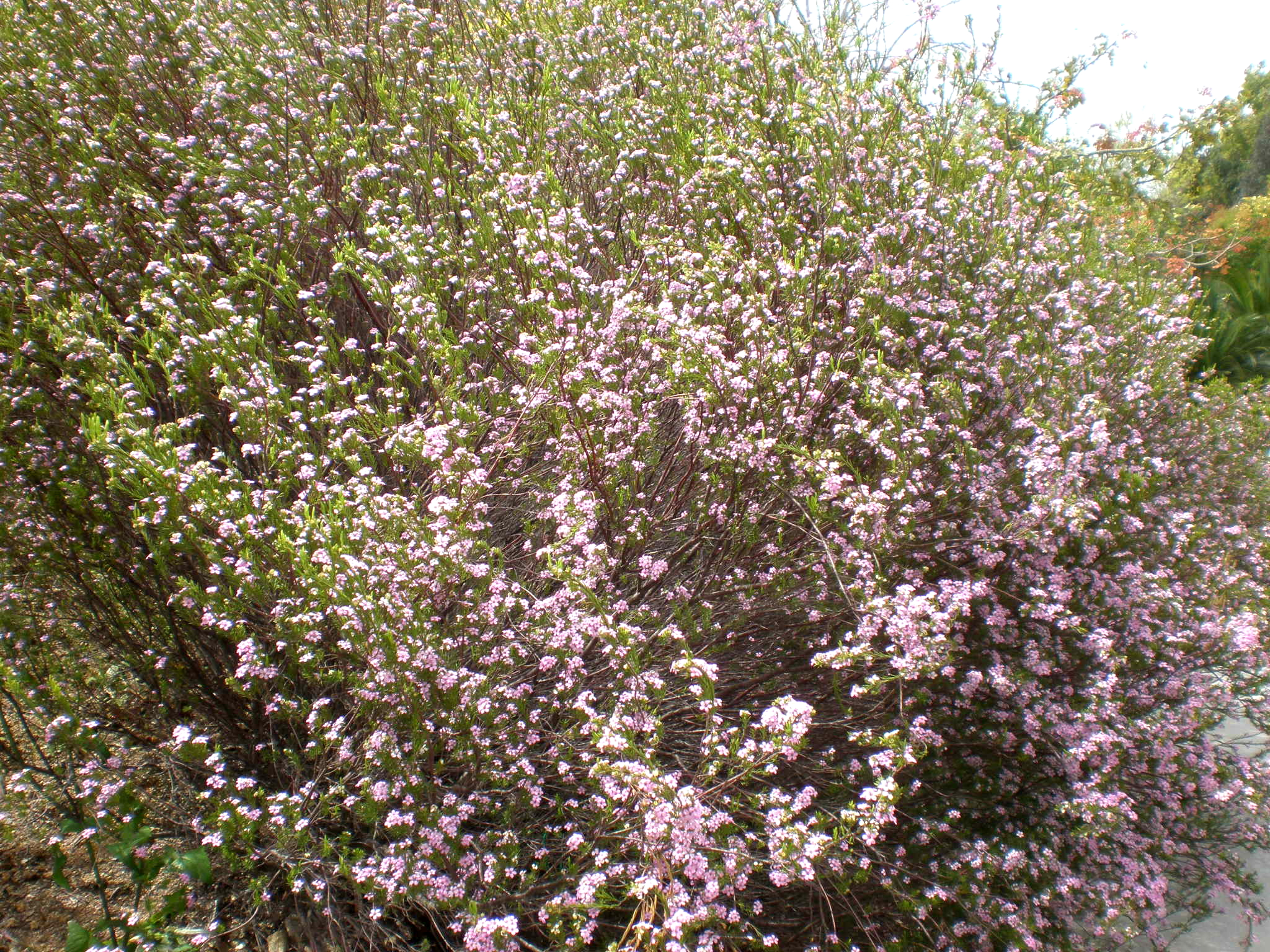
A flowering shrub

It is woody, evergreen and rather dense shrub that is erect in posture that grows to between 0.8 and 1.6 metres (2 ft 7 in and 5 ft 3 in) high. It forms a single stem at the base, from where numerous thin and erect branches grow. The aromatic leaves are like needles and are 4 to 5 times longer (8-10 mm) than they are wide (0.8 mm). The petiole is 1 mm long. The dwarf variety 'Dwarf Pink' grows between 0.6 and 0.9 metres (2 ft 0 in and 2 ft 11 in).

The flowers are solitary, terminal in short axillary twigs or in small twigs, often dense towards the top of the branches. They are pink, often white, and star-shaped (7 to 8 mm in diameter), with 5 oval petals, 5.0-5.7 mm long, each marked with a distinctive central vein. The entire shrub will be covered in pink flowers from May to October, attracting bees, butterflies and other insects. The fruit is made up of a 5-chamber capsule, dotted with glands. There is a shiny black seed in each chamber.

== Taxonomy ==
The species was formally described in 1981 in the Journal of South African Botany. Prior to that, plants in cultivation had been erroneously identified as Coleonema pulchrum.

== Weed potential ==
The species is naturalised in Victoria, Australia. Although not typically listed among Victoria's most aggressive or noxious agricultural weeds, it can behave as an environmental weed by escaping gardens into adjacent bushland, especially in near-coastal heathland and heathy woodland.

== Cultivars ==
- 'Compactum' ('Nanum') — dwarf pink flowering form growing to 1m
- 'Rubrum' ('Red Form') — red flowering form
- 'Sunset Gold' — dwarf form with golden foliage to 75 cm high
- 'Album' — white flowering variant
