= Diosma =

Scientific classification
- Kingdom: Plantae
- Clade: Tracheophytes
- Clade: Angiosperms
- Clade: Eudicots
- Clade: Rosids
- Order: Sapindales
- Family: Rutaceae
- Subfamily: Zanthoxyloideae
- Genus: Diosma; L.

Species
- See text.

Synonyms
- Aestuaria (L.) Schaeff.

Genus of plants

Diosma is a genus of flowering plants in the family Rutaceae, native to Cape Provinces of South Africa. The genus was first described by Carl Linnaeus in 1753.

== Species ==
As of September 2021, Plants of the World Online accepted the following species:

- Diosma acmaeophylla Eckl. & Zeyh.
- Diosma apetala (Dümmer) I.Williams
- Diosma arenicola I.Williams
- Diosma aristata I.Williams
- Diosma aspalathoides Lam.
- Diosma awilana I.Williams
- Diosma demissa I.Williams
- Diosma dichotoma P.J.Bergius
- Diosma echinulata I.Williams
- Diosma fallax I.Williams
- Diosma guthriei Glover
- Diosma haelkraalensis I.Williams
- Diosma hirsuta L.
- Diosma meyeriana Spreng.
- Diosma oppositifolia L.
- Diosma parvula I.Williams
- Diosma passerinoides Steud.
- Diosma pedicellata I.Williams
- Diosma pilosa I.Williams
- Diosma prama I.Williams
- Diosma ramosissima Bartl. & H.L.Wendl.
- Diosma recurva Cham.
- Diosma rourkei I.Williams
- Diosma sabulosa I.Williams
- Diosma strumosa I.Williams
- Diosma subulata J.C.Wendl.
- Diosma tenella I.Williams
- Diosma thyrsophora Eckl. & Zeyh.
