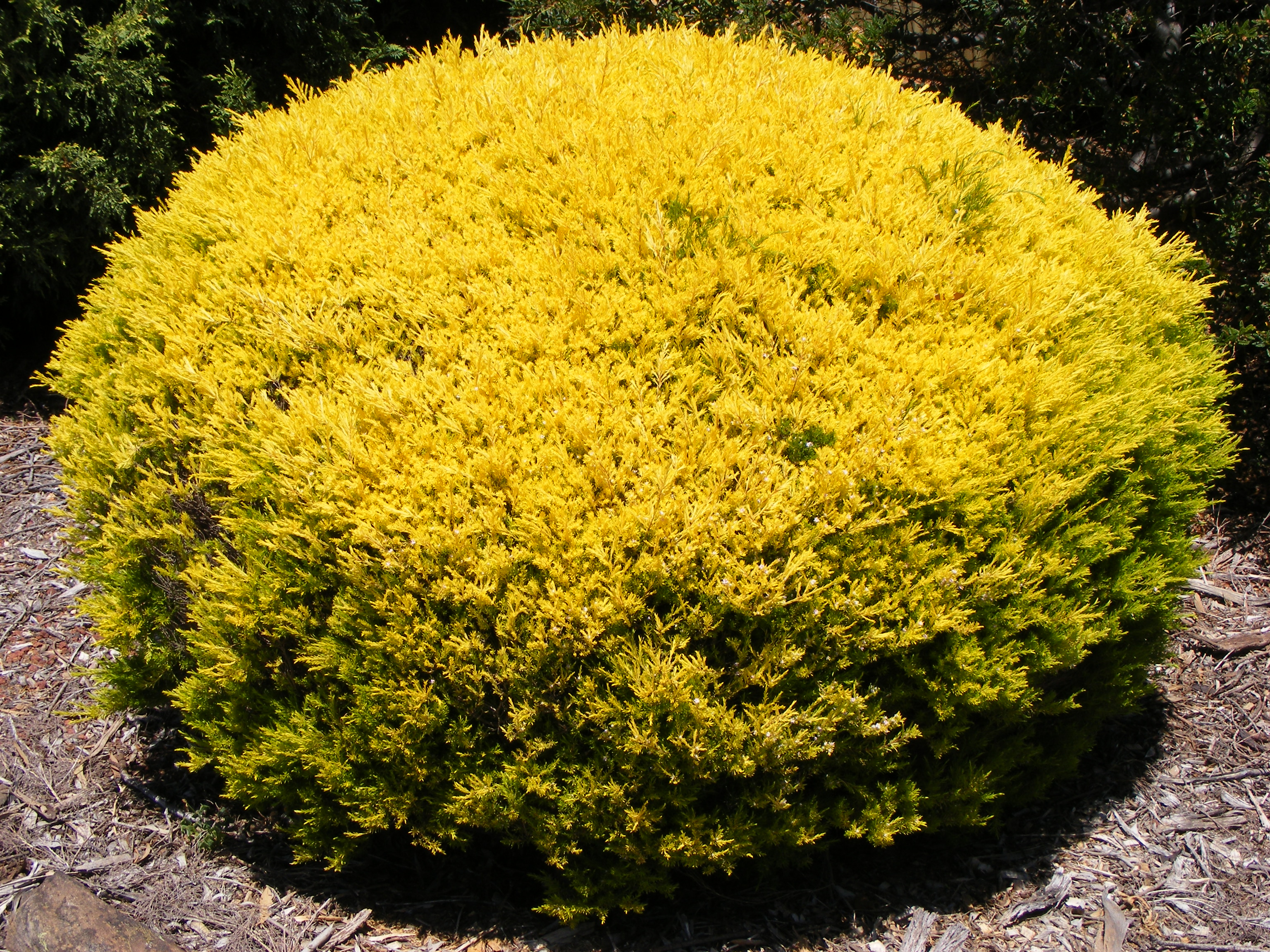
- Coleonema pulchrum 'Aurea' (Golden Diosma)

Scientific classification
- Kingdom: Plantae
- Clade: Tracheophytes
- Clade: Angiosperms
- Clade: Eudicots
- Clade: Rosids
- Order: Sapindales
- Family: Rutaceae
- Subfamily: Zanthoxyloideae
- Genus: Coleonema; Bartl. & H.L.Wendl.

Species
- See text.

= Coleonema =

Genus of flowering plants

Coleonema is a genus of flowering plants in the family Rutaceae. The eight known species are all from the western Cape Province of South Africa. In Australia, where they are cultivated as garden ornamentals, they are often referred to as Diosma, a different genus in the same family.

== Species ==
As of September 2021, the following species were accepted by Plants of the World Online:

- Coleonema album (Thunb.) Bartl. & H.L.Wendl. – Cape may, white confetti bush, aasbossie, klipboegoe
- Coleonema aspalathoides A.Juss. ex G.Don – confetti bush
- Coleonema calycinum (Steud.) I.Williams – confetti bush, diosma, broom buchu, boegoe
- Coleonema juniperinum Sond.
- Coleonema nubigena Esterh.
- Coleonema pulchellum I.Williams – confetti bush, buchu
- Coleonema pulchrum Hook.
- Coleonema virgatum (Schltdl.) Eckl. & Zeyh.
