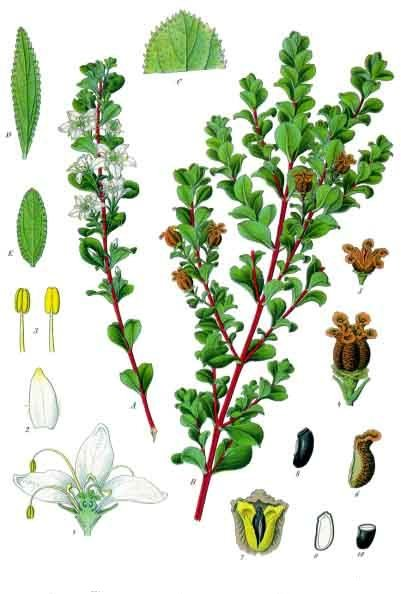

Scientific classification
- Kingdom: Plantae
- Clade: Embryophytes
- Clade: Tracheophytes
- Clade: Spermatophytes
- Clade: Angiosperms
- Clade: Eudicots
- Clade: Rosids
- Order: Sapindales
- Family: Rutaceae
- Genus: Agathosma
- Species: A. betulina

Binomial name
- Agathosma betulina (Berg.) Pillans

= Agathosma betulina =

Species of flowering plant

Agathosma betulina (previously Barosma betulina) is a flowering plant in the family Rutaceae, native to the lower elevation mountains of western South Africa, where it occurs near streams in fynbos habitats.

== Description ==
It is an evergreen shrub growing to 2 m (6 ft 7 in) tall. The leaves are opposite, rounded, about 20 mm (0.79 in) long and broad, glossy, and fragrant. The flowers are white or pale pink, with five petals; the fruit is a five-parted capsule which splits open to release the seeds.

== Etymology ==
It is known by the common name round leaf buchu. The very similar plant Agathosma crenulata (previously Barosma crenulata) is known as the oval leaf buchu, and has been used for the same purposes. The two are chemically distinct, however; for example, A. betulina contains quercetin-dimethyl ether-glucoside, while A. crenulata does not.

== Uses ==
Wild plants of this species are still plentiful but are being harvested faster than they can reproduce. The threat of their becoming scarce has led to efforts to cultivate them. The essential oils and extracts of the leaves are used as flavoring for teas, candy, and a liquor known as buchu brandy in South Africa. The two primary chemical constituents of the oils of A. betulina are isomenthone and diosphenol. The extract is said to taste like blackcurrant.

== Folk medicine ==
The plant has been used by the indigenous people of South Africa to as a folk remedy for various disorders, including urinary tract infections. Dutch settlers in early times used Agathosma betulina commonly called buchu to make a brandy tincture. The tincture is still used today.
