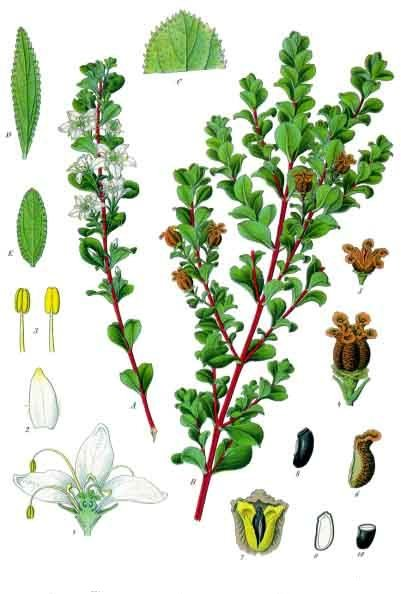
- Agathosma betulina

Scientific classification
- Kingdom: Plantae
- Clade: Embryophytes
- Clade: Tracheophytes
- Clade: Spermatophytes
- Clade: Angiosperms
- Clade: Eudicots
- Clade: Rosids
- Order: Sapindales
- Family: Rutaceae
- Subfamily: Zanthoxyloideae
- Genus: Agathosma; Willd. (nom. cons.)

Species
- See text.

Synonyms
- Barosma Willd.; Hartogia L.; Parapetalifera J.C.Wendl.

= Agathosma =

Genus of plants from southern Africa

Agathosma is a genus of about 140 species of flowering plants in the family Rutaceae, native to the southern part of Africa. Common names include buchu, boegoe, bucco, bookoo, and diosma. Buchu formally denotes two herbal species, prized for their fragrance and medicinal use despite their toxicity. In colloquial use however, the term (see Boegoe) is applied to a wider set of fragrant shrubs or substitutes.

They are small shrubs and subshrubs, mostly with erect woody stems reaching 30–100 cm (1–3 ft) tall, but low-growing and prostrate in some species. The leaves are usually opposite, ericoid, often crowded, simple, entire, from 0.5 to 3.5 cm (1/4 to 1 1/2 in) long. The flowers are produced in terminal clusters, 0.7–2 cm (1/4–3/4 in) diameter, with five white, pink, red or purple, petals.

Many of the species are highly aromatic, and the genus name means "good fragrance". Some species of the genus are used as herbal remedies.

== Uses ==
Two species of Agathosma endemic to the Western Cape mountains of South Africa and colloquially referred to as "buchu" are cultivated on a commercial basis for their essential oils, Agathosma betulina and Agathosma crenulata. The leaves of Agathosma betulina have been used in traditional medicine. Bottled agathosma infusions were widely sold in English-speaking countries as "buchu tea" in the 1860s and 1870s.

Although demand declined in the 1880s, consumption has continued to the present day; as of 2012, bottled infusions continue to be prepared from agathosma leaves. In addition, traditional buchu tinctures can be prepared by placing leaves and stalks into brandy. "Buchu vinegar", prepared by steeping the leaves and stalks in vinegar, also is a traditional remedy used for example in compresses and also taken internally.

The essential oil is used in the manufacture of flavorings and perfume. There appear to be differences in people's perceptions of the smell, possibly determined genetically, rather than by familiarity or nurture. Some people find the smell to be repulsive, while most find it pleasantly herbal. This is not particularly unusual in reaction to the smells of many aromatic Karoo shrubs.

== Gallery ==
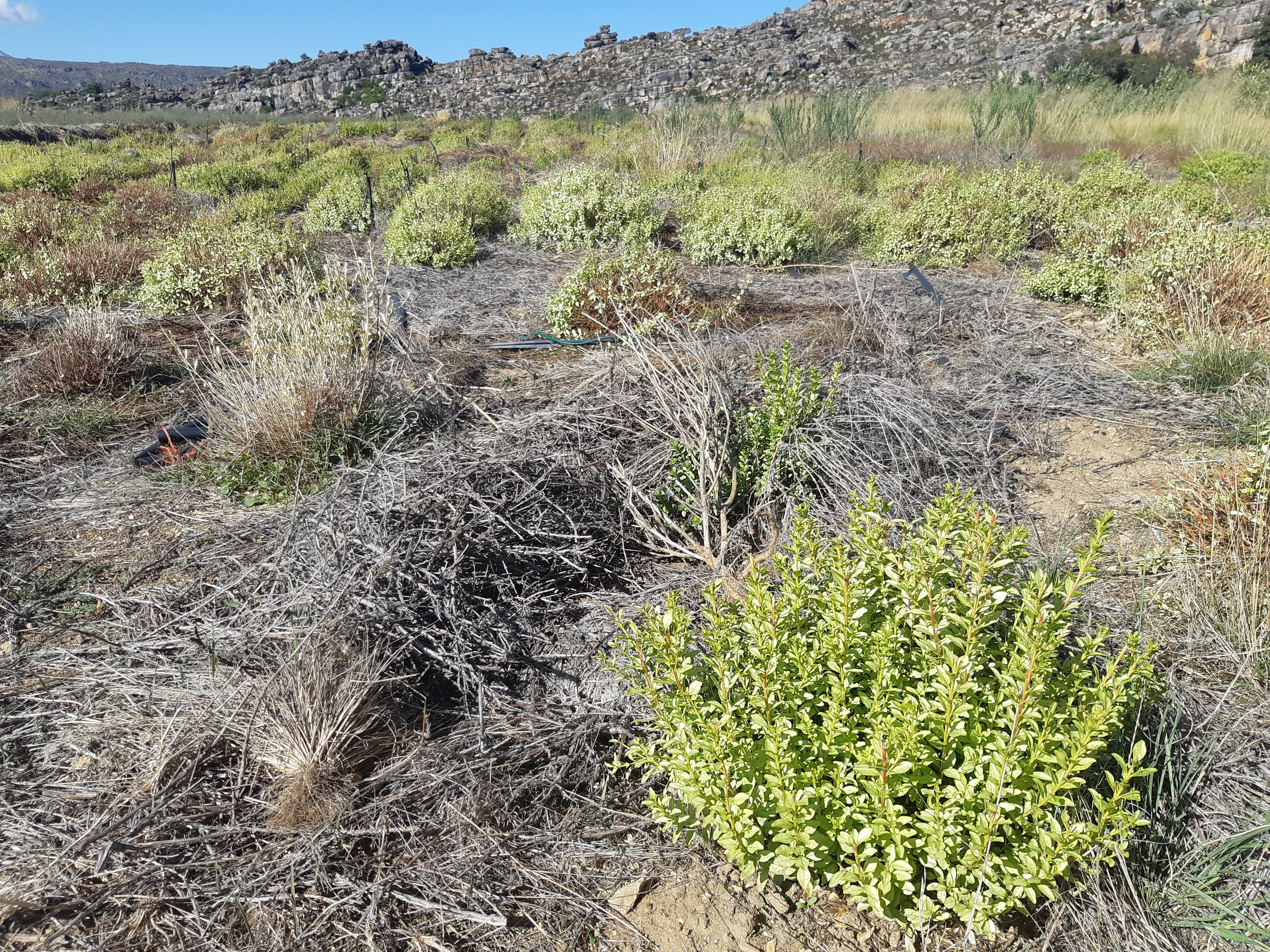
Buchu (Agathosma) being commercially grown in the Groot Winterhoek mountains of the Western Cape

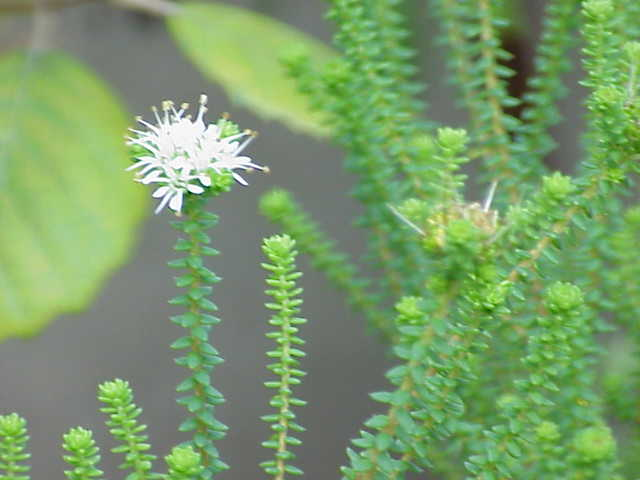
Agathosma apiculata

== Selected species ==
^{List sources :}^{,}^{,}

- A. abrupta Pillans
- A. acocksii Pillans
- A. acutissima Dümmer
- A. adenandriflora Schltr.
- A. adnata Pillans
- A. aemula Schltr.
- A. affinis Sond.
- A. alaris Cham.
- A. alligans I.Williams
- A. alpina Schltr.
- A. alticola Schltr. ex Dümmer
- A. anomala E.Mey. ex Sond.
- A. apiculata E.Mey. ex Bartl. & H.L.Wendl.
- A. asperifolia Eckl. & Zeyh.
- A. barnesiae Compton
- A. bathii (Dümmer) Pillans
- A. betulina (P.J.Bergius) Pillans
- A. bicolor Dümmer
- A. bicornuta R.A.Dyer
- A. bifida Bartl. & H.L.Wendl.
- A. bisulca Bartl. & H.L.Wendl.
- A. blaerioides Cham.
- A. bodkinii Dümmer
- A. capensis (L.) Dümmer
- A. capitata Sond.
- A. cedrimontana Dümmer
- A. cephalodes E.Mey. ex Sond.
- A. cerefolia (Vent.) Bartl. & H.L.Wendl.
- A. ciliaris (L.) Druce
- A. ciliata (L.) Link
- A. clavisepala R.A.Dyer
- A. collina Eckl. & Zeyh.
- A. concava Pillans
- A. conferta Pillans
- A. cordifolia Pillans
- A. corymbosa (Montin) G.Don
- A. craspedota E.Mey. ex Sond.
- A. crassifolia Sond.
- A. crenulata (L.) Pillans
- A. decurrens Pillans
- A. dentata Pillans
- A. dielsiana Schltr. ex Dümmer
- A. distans Pillans
- A. divaricata Pillans
- A. dregeana Sond.
- A. elata Sond.
- A. elegans Cham.
- A. eriantha (Steud.) Steud.
- A. esterhuyseniae Pillans
- A. florida Sond.
- A. florulenta Sond.
- A. foetidissima (Bartl. & H.C.Wendl.) Steud. – Bokboegoe
- A. foleyana Dümmer
- A. fraudulenta Sond.
- A. geniculata Pillans
- A. giftbergensis E.Phillips
- A. glabrata Bartl. & H.L.Wendl.
- A. glandulosa (Thunb.) Sond.
- A. gnidiiflora Dümmer
- A. gonaquensis Eckl. & Zeyh. – Gonaqua buchu
- A. hirsuta Pillans
- A. hirta Bartl. & H.L.Wendl.
- A. hispida (Thunb.) Bartl. & H.L.Wendl.
- A. hookeri Sond.
- A. humilis Sond.
- A. imbricata (L.) Willd.
- A. insignis (Compton) Pillans
- A. involucrata Eckl. & Zeyh.
- A. joubertiana Schltdl.
- A. juniperifolia Bartl.
- A. kougaensis Pillans
- A. krakadouwensis Dümmer
- A. lanceolata (L.) Engl.
- A. lancifolia Eckl. & Zeyh.
- A. latipetala Sond.
- A. leptospermoides Sond.
- A. linifolia (Licht. ex Roem. & Schult.) Licht. ex Bartl. & H.L.Wendl.
- A. longicornu Pillans
- A. marifolia Eckl. & Zeyh.
- A. marlothii Dümmer
- A. martiana Sond.
- A. microcalyx Dümmer
- A. microcarpa (Sond.) Pillans
- A. minuta Schltdl.
- A. mirabilis Pillans
- A. mucronulata Sond. – Buchu
- A. muirii E.Phillips
- A. mundtii Cham. & Schltdl.
- A. namaquensis Pillans
- A. odoratissima (Montin) Pillans
- A. orbicularis (Thunb.) Bartl. & H.L.Wendl.
- A. ovalifolia Pillans
- A. ovata (Thunb.) Pillans – False buchu
- A. pallens Pillans
- A. pattisonae Dümmer
- A. peglerae Dümmer
- A. pentachotoma E.Mey. ex Sond.
- A. perdita Hutch.
- A. phillipsii Dümmer
- A. pilifera Schltdl.
- A. planifolia Sond.
- A. propinqua Sond.
- A. puberula (Steud.) Fourc.
- A. pubigera Sond.
- A. pulchella (L.) Link
- A. pungens (E.Mey. ex Sond.) Pillans
- A. purpurea Pillans
- A. recurvifolia Sond.
- A. rehmanniana Dümmer
- A. riversdalensis Dümmer
- A. robusta Eckl. & Zeyh.
- A. roodebergensis Compton
- A. rosmarinifolia (Bartl.) I.Williams
- A. rubricaulis Dümmer
- A. rudolphii I.Williams
- A. sabulosa Sond.
- A. salina Eckl. & Zeyh.
- A. scaberula Dümmer
- A. sedifolia Schltdl.
- A. serpyllacea Licht. ex Schult.
- A. serratifolia (Curtis) Spreeth
- A. sladeniana Glover
- A. spinescens Dümmer
- A. spinosa Sond.
- A. squamosa (Willd. ex Roem. & Schult.) Bartl. & H.L.Wendl.
- A. stenopetala (Steud.) Steud.
- A. stenosepala Pillans
- A. stilbeoides Dümmer
- A. stipitata Pillans
- A. stokoei Pillans
- A. subteretifolia Pillans
- A. tabularis Sond.
- A. thymifolia Schltdl.
- A. trichocarpa Holmes
- A. tulbaghensis Dümmer
- A. umbonata Pillans
- A. unicarpellata (Fourc.) Pillans
- A. venusta (Eckl. & Zeyh.) Pillans
- A. villosa (Willd.) Willd. (type)
- A. virgata (Lam.) Bartl. & H.L.Wendl.
- A. zwartbergensis Pillans
