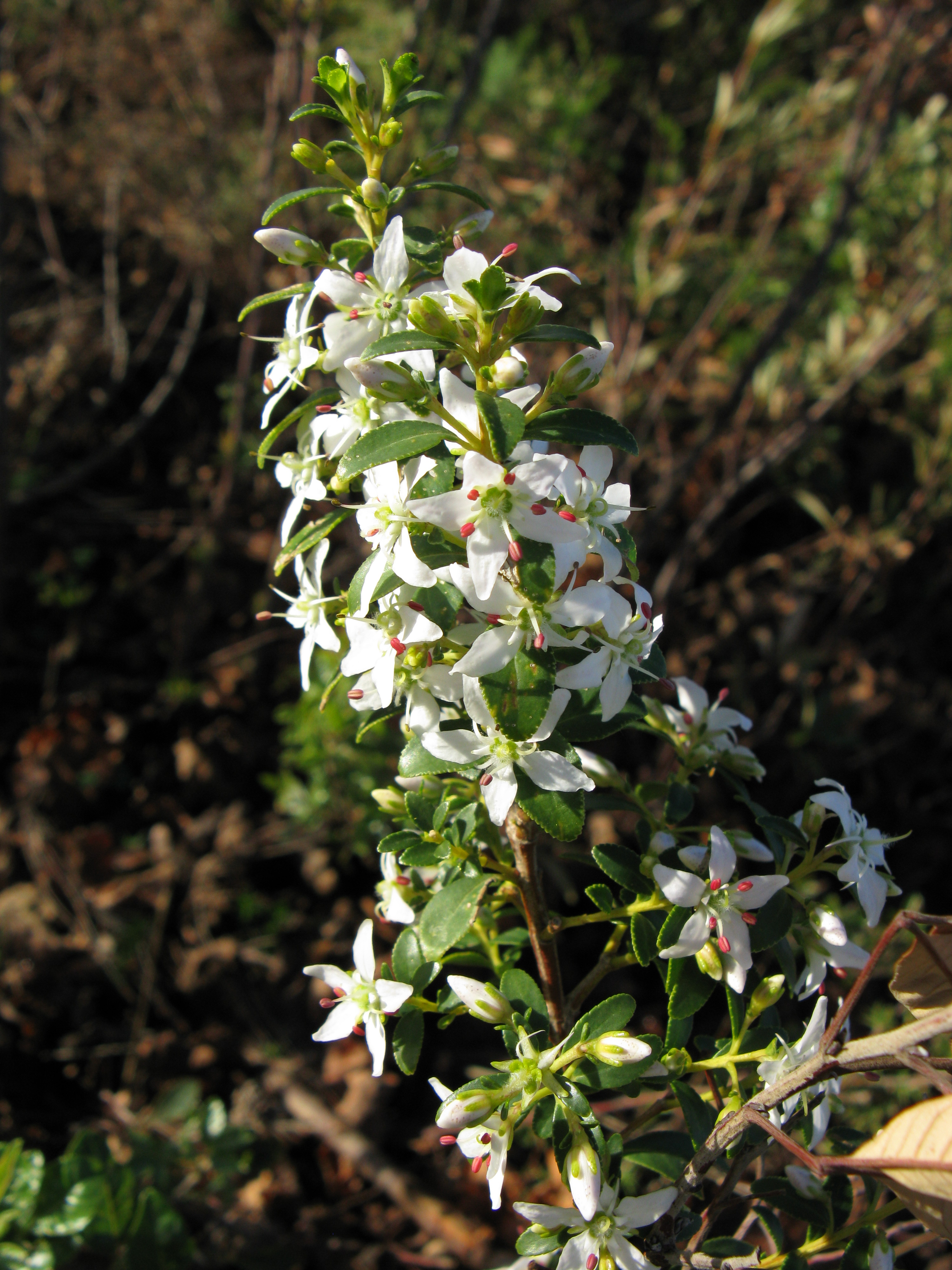

Scientific classification
- Kingdom: Plantae
- Clade: Embryophytes
- Clade: Tracheophytes
- Clade: Spermatophytes
- Clade: Angiosperms
- Clade: Eudicots
- Clade: Rosids
- Order: Sapindales
- Family: Rutaceae
- Genus: Agathosma
- Species: A. crenulata

Binomial name
- Agathosma crenulata (L.) Pillans

= Agathosma crenulata =

Species of plant from South Africa

Agathosma crenulata (previously Barosma crenulata) is a flowering plant in the family Rutaceae, native to the lower elevation mountains of southwestern South Africa, where it occurs near streams in fynbos habitats. It is an evergreen shrub growing to 1.5–2.5 m (4.9–8.2 ft) tall. The leaves are opposite, oval, 15–35 mm long and 7–18 mm broad. The flowers are white or pale pink, with five petals; the fruit is a five-parted capsule which splits open to release the seeds.

It is known by the common name oval leaf buchu and has historically been used as a flavoring agent and an herbal remedy. The very similar plant Agathosma betulina (previously Barosma betulina) is known as the round leaf buchu, and has been used for the same purposes.

The plant produces many sweet-smelling white flowers, which attract nectar-drinking insects. It then produces small green fruits. The leaves have traditionally been steeped in brandy, vinegar, and tea water, and are said to relieve gastrointestinal and urinary tract ailments.

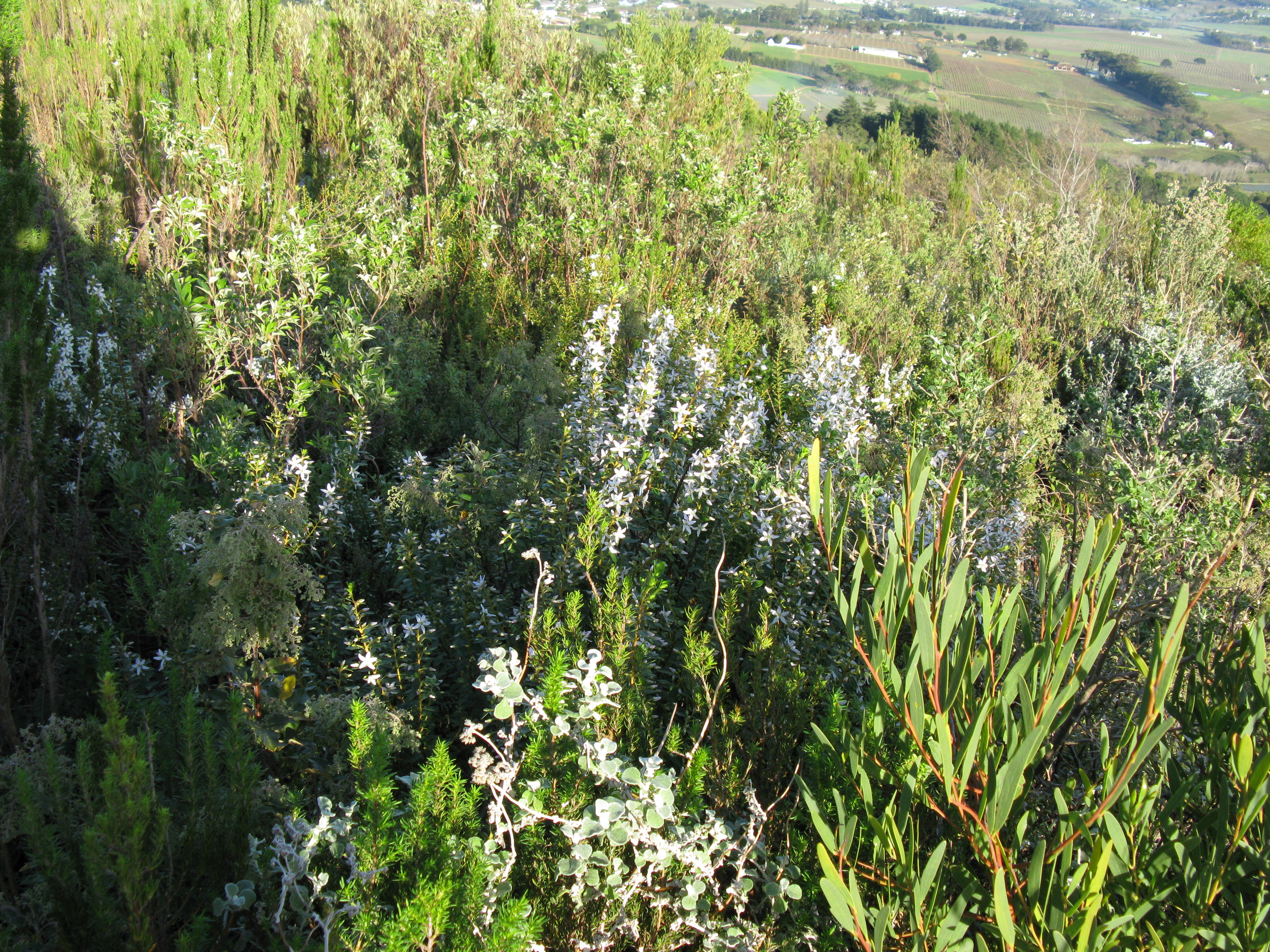
Agathosma crenulata growing in fynbos in the Western Cape in South Africa
