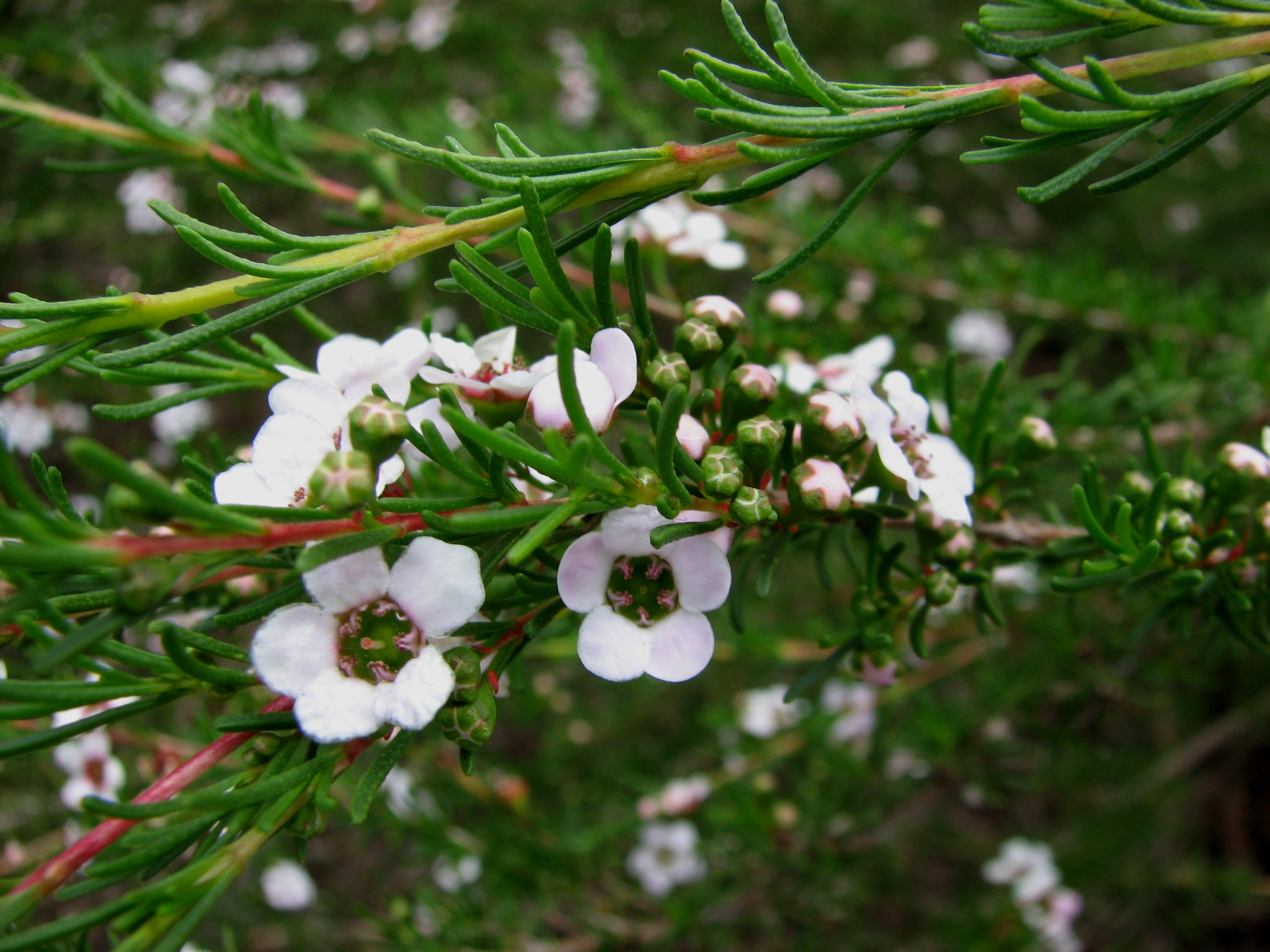
- Astartea fascicularis

Scientific classification
- Kingdom: Plantae
- Clade: Embryophytes
- Clade: Tracheophytes
- Clade: Spermatophytes
- Clade: Angiosperms
- Clade: Eudicots
- Clade: Rosids
- Order: Myrtales
- Family: Myrtaceae
- Subfamily: Myrtoideae
- Tribe: Chamelaucieae
- Genus: Astartea; DC.

Species
- 23 – see text

= Astartea =

Genus of flowering plants

Astartea is a genus of flowering plants in the myrtle family, Myrtaceae. The genus is endemic to southwestern Western Australia. The genus name was inspired by Astarte, the Greek name for the goddess Ishtar.

== Description ==
These plants take various forms, from dwarf shrubs barely 10 centimetres tall to small trees exceeding 5 metres in height. Some have lignotubers and some produce basal shoots. They are hairless and often glandular, sometimes with protruding oil glands on various parts. New stems are four-angled and sometimes winged.

The leaves are often arranged in fascicles, with clusters of leaves along younger branches. The thick leaves are narrow, often widest toward the tips, and are smooth-edged.

Most species have solitary flowers in the leaf axils. The buds are enfolded in a pair of bracteoles which usually fall away as the flower blooms. Most plants have five-parted flowers. Six-parted flowers may occur, and four parted, late-opening flowers may be produced when a plant is stressed. Layers of petals unfold in an opening bud, leaving the inner ones crinkled. A. arbuscula has the smallest petals, each about half a millimetre long. The petals of A. granitica are among the largest, each about 6 millimetres long. Each species generally has flowers either in shades of white to pale pink, or shades of pale to medium pink. Some individuals of A. arbuscula have deep pink flowers. Some plants have just a few stamens per flower, while others have up to 60. This varies across species, but also within species and even among flowers on one individual. A few species also have staminodes. The style elongates as the flower matures, and the tip is a dark red colour while the base is paler.

The fruit is a woody capsule. The fruit of some species is dehiscent, breaking open to release the seeds, while others are indehiscent. There are one to many seeds per fruit. Most are about one millimetre long. Species native to drier habitats tend to have thick-coated seeds. There may also be chaff.

Species in this genus can be variable across individuals and populations. Variation can be caused by genetics, environmental factors such as rainfall, disturbances such as fires, and microhabitat differences. Plants also vary seasonally.

== Ecology ==
These plants are mostly found in damp areas, such as puddly rock outcroppings and the margins of waterways. Some grow in swamps and on floodplains.

Most species are insect-pollinated. Native bees and jewel beetles are commonly observed on the flowers. Astartea flower in summer, when many other plants have finished their flowering periods, so the genus may provide an important source of summer food for nectar-feeding insects. Many sap-feeding insects can be found on the plants, including mirid bugs and larval felt scales. Astartea often have galls, which are probably formed by wasps. Some species have seeds that may be adapted to dispersal by ants.

== Cultivation ==
Astartea are not difficult to grow, and even have the potential to become weedy upon escape from cultivation. Cultivars developed for ornamental use include Astartea 'Winter Pink'.

== Species ==
In a 2013 taxonomic revision of the genus, 22 species were recognized. As of January 2026, Plants of the World Online accepts the following 23 species. In Australia A. laricifolia has been synonymised with A. pulchella.

- Astartea affinis (Endl.) Rye – west-coast astartea
- Astartea arbuscula (R.Br. ex Benth.) Rye – minute astartea
- Astartea aspera Schauer – rough-stemmed astartea
- Astartea astarteoides (Benth.) Rye
- Astartea cicatricosa Rye & Trudgen
- Astartea corniculata Schauer
- Astartea decemcostata Rye – Barrens astartea
- Astartea eobalta Rye
- Astartea fascicularis (Labill.) DC. – Recherche astartea
- Astartea glomerulosa Schauer – early astartea
- Astartea granitica Rye & Trudgen – granite astartea
- Astartea laricifolia Schauer – winged astartea
- Astartea leptophylla Schauer – river-bank astartea
- Astartea middletonii Rye
- Astartea montana Rye – Stirling Range astartea
- Astartea muricata Turcz. – inland astartea
- Astartea onycis Rye & Trudgen – clawed astartea
- Astartea pulchella (DC.) Rye
- Astartea reticulata Rye
- Astartea schaueri Rye & Trudgen
- Astartea scoparia Schauer – common astartea
- Astartea transversa Rye
- Astartea zephyra Rye & Trudgen

=== Formerly included ===
- Cyathostemon ambiguus (as A. ambigua)
- Cyathostemon heterantherus (as A. heteranthera)
- Seorsus clavifolius (as A. clavifolia)
- Seorsus intratropicus (as A. intratropica)

== Gallery ==
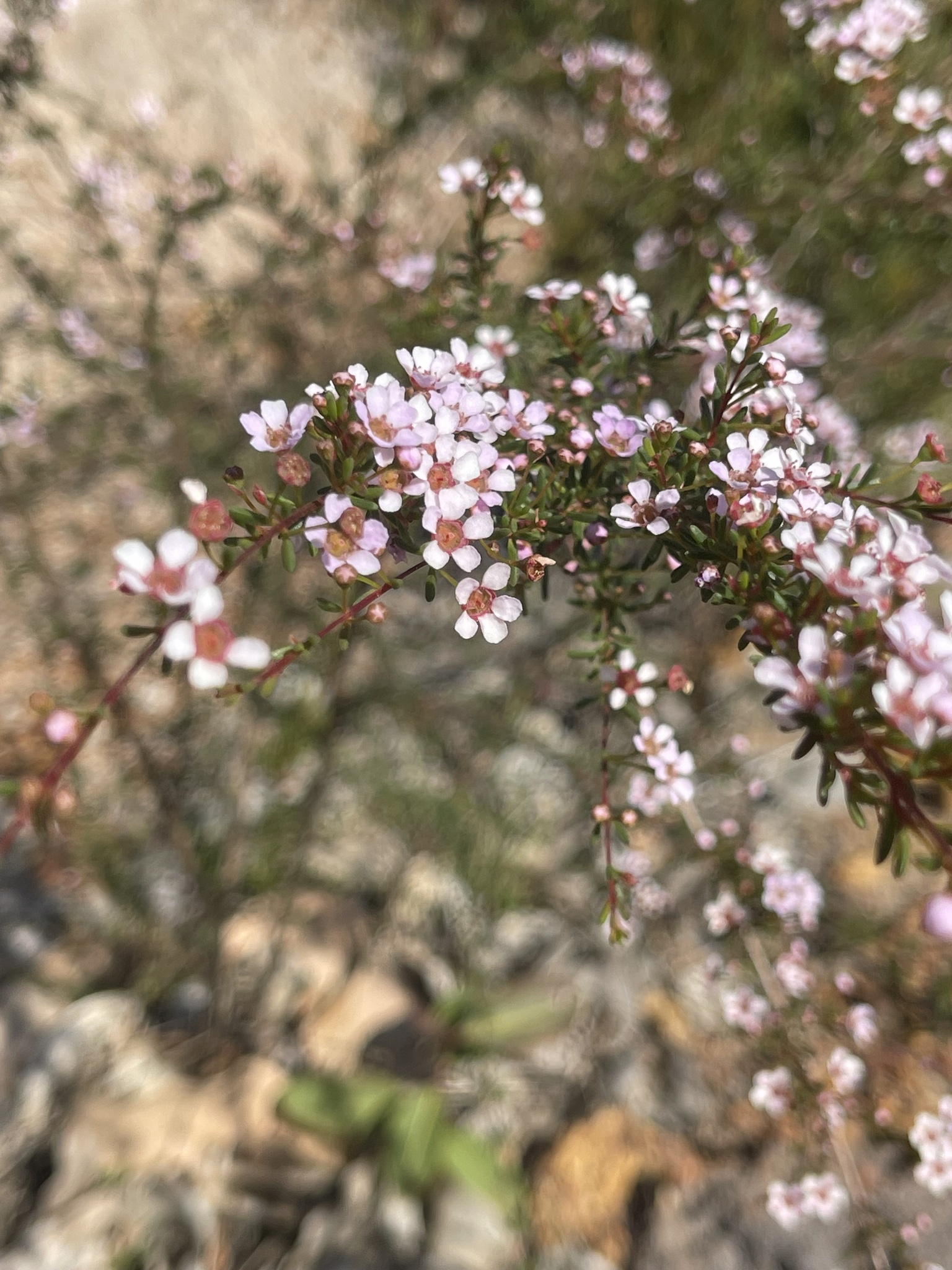
A. glomerulosa

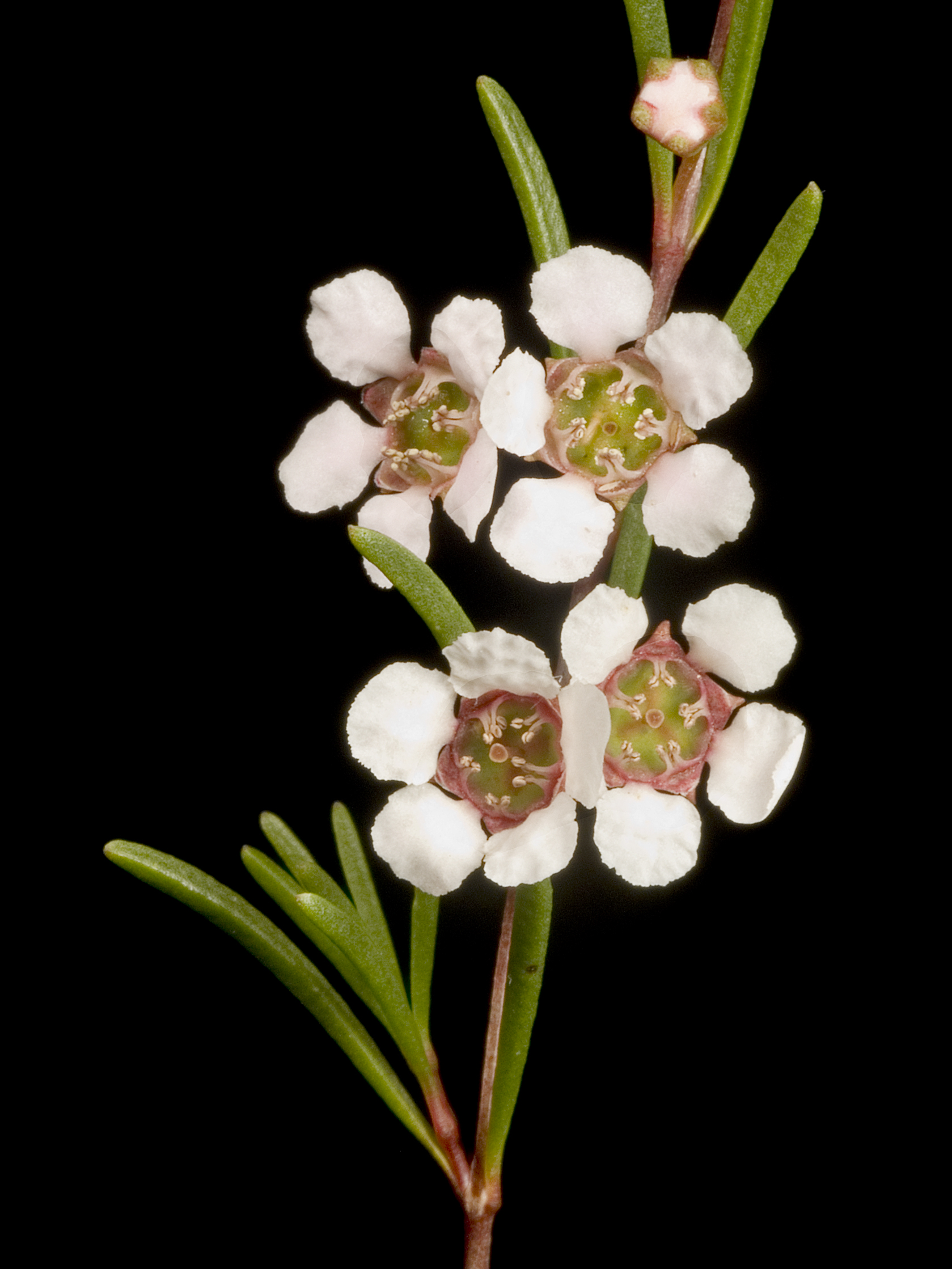
A. affinis

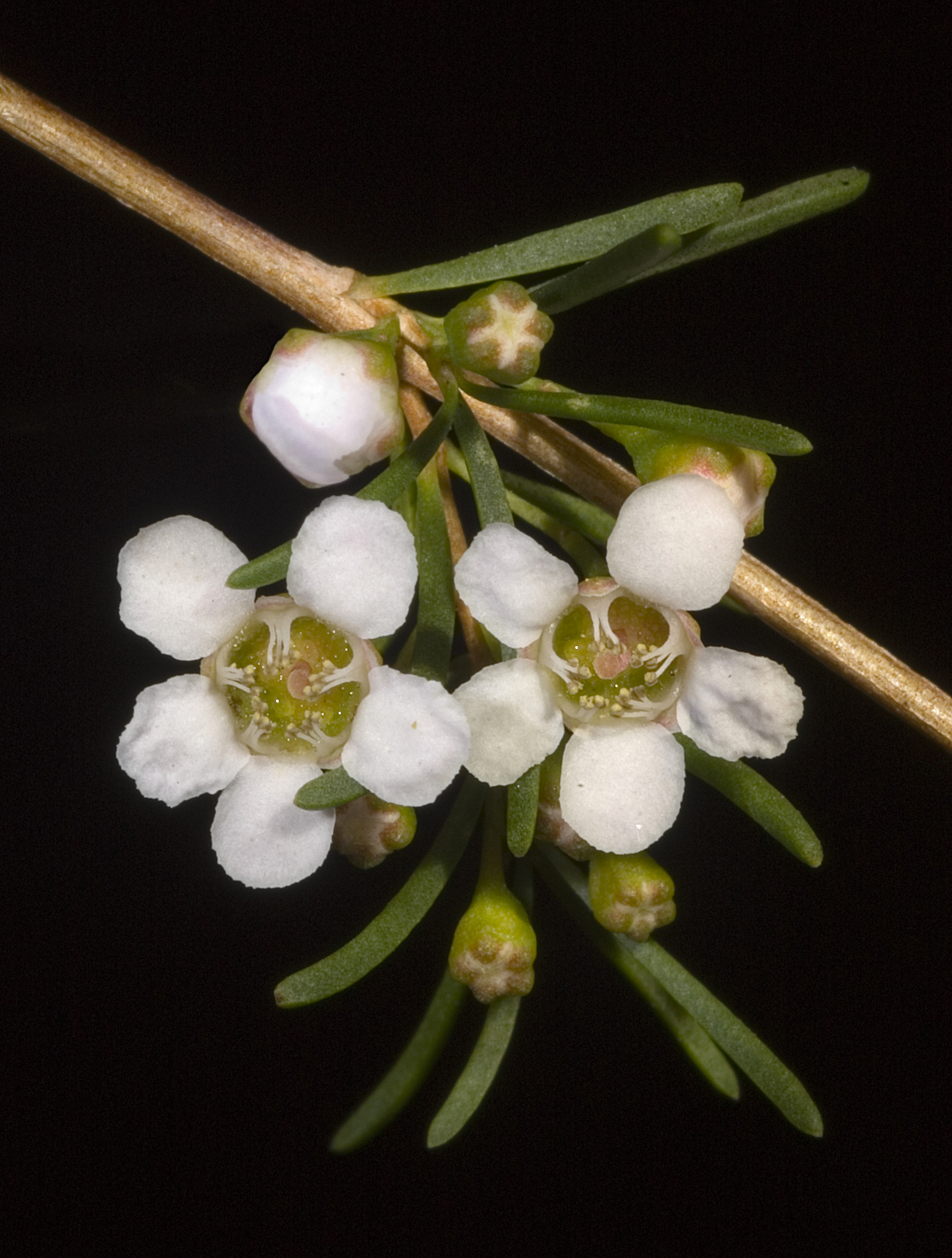
A. scoparia

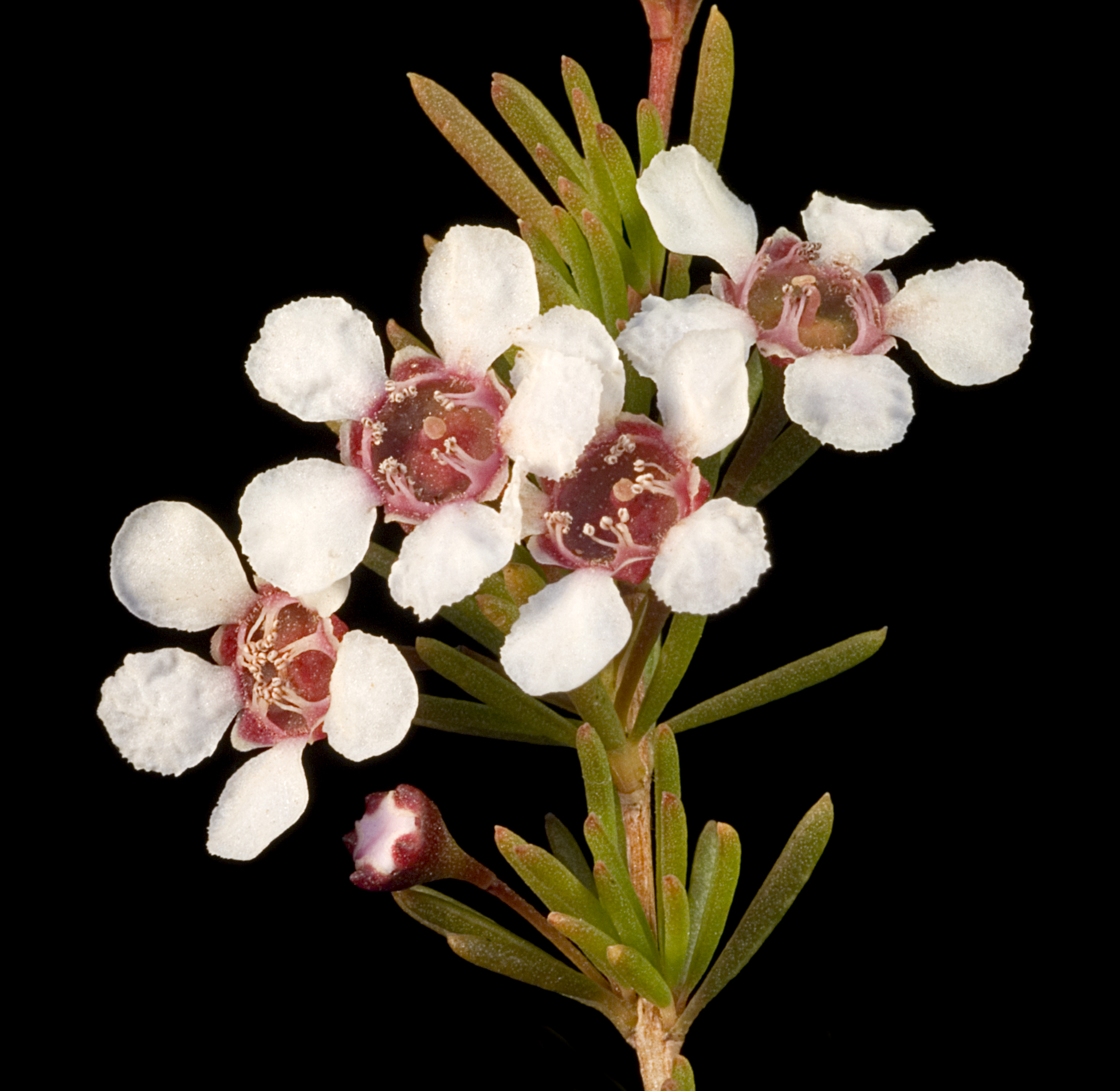
A. schaueri

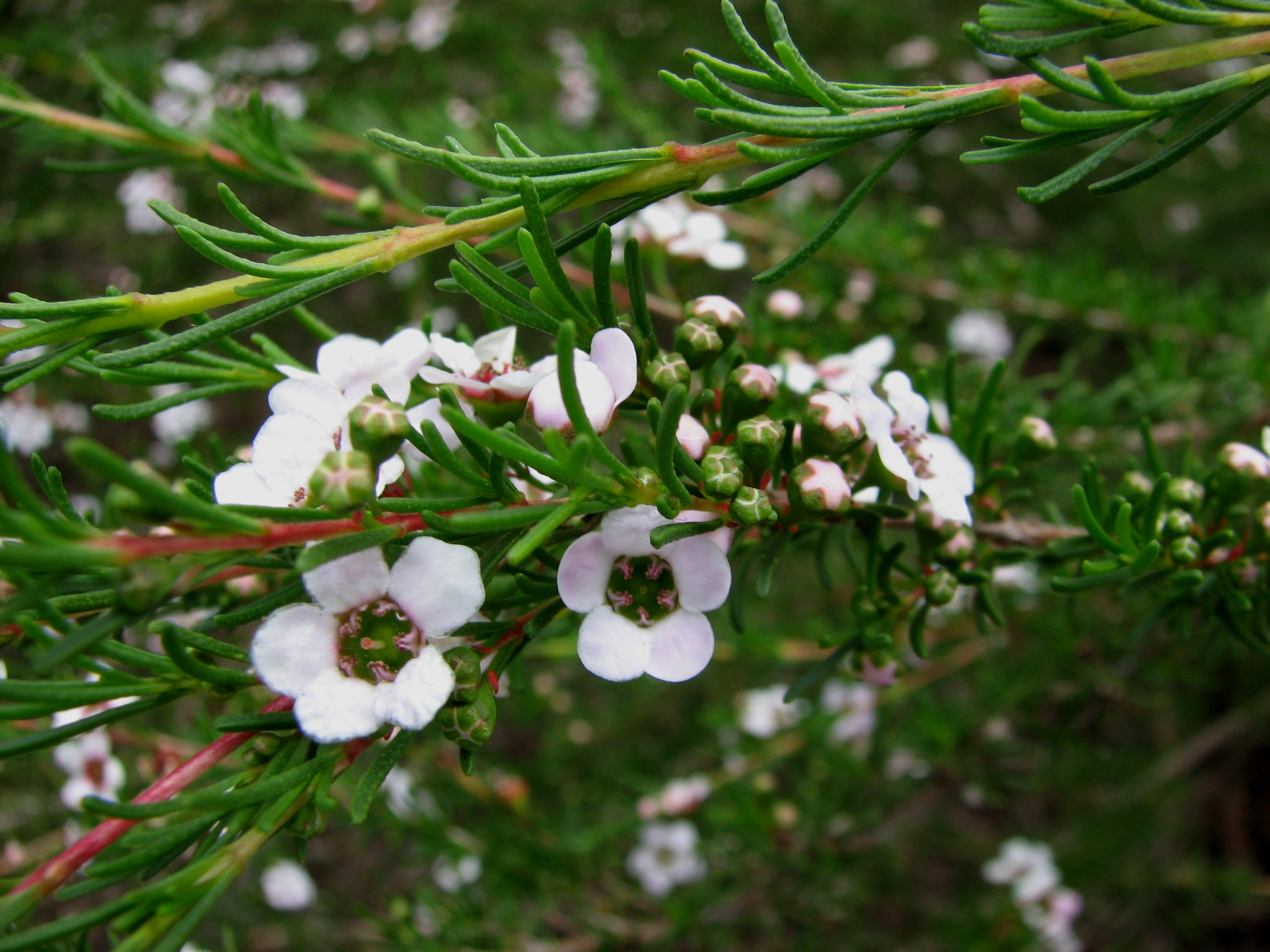
A. fascicularis

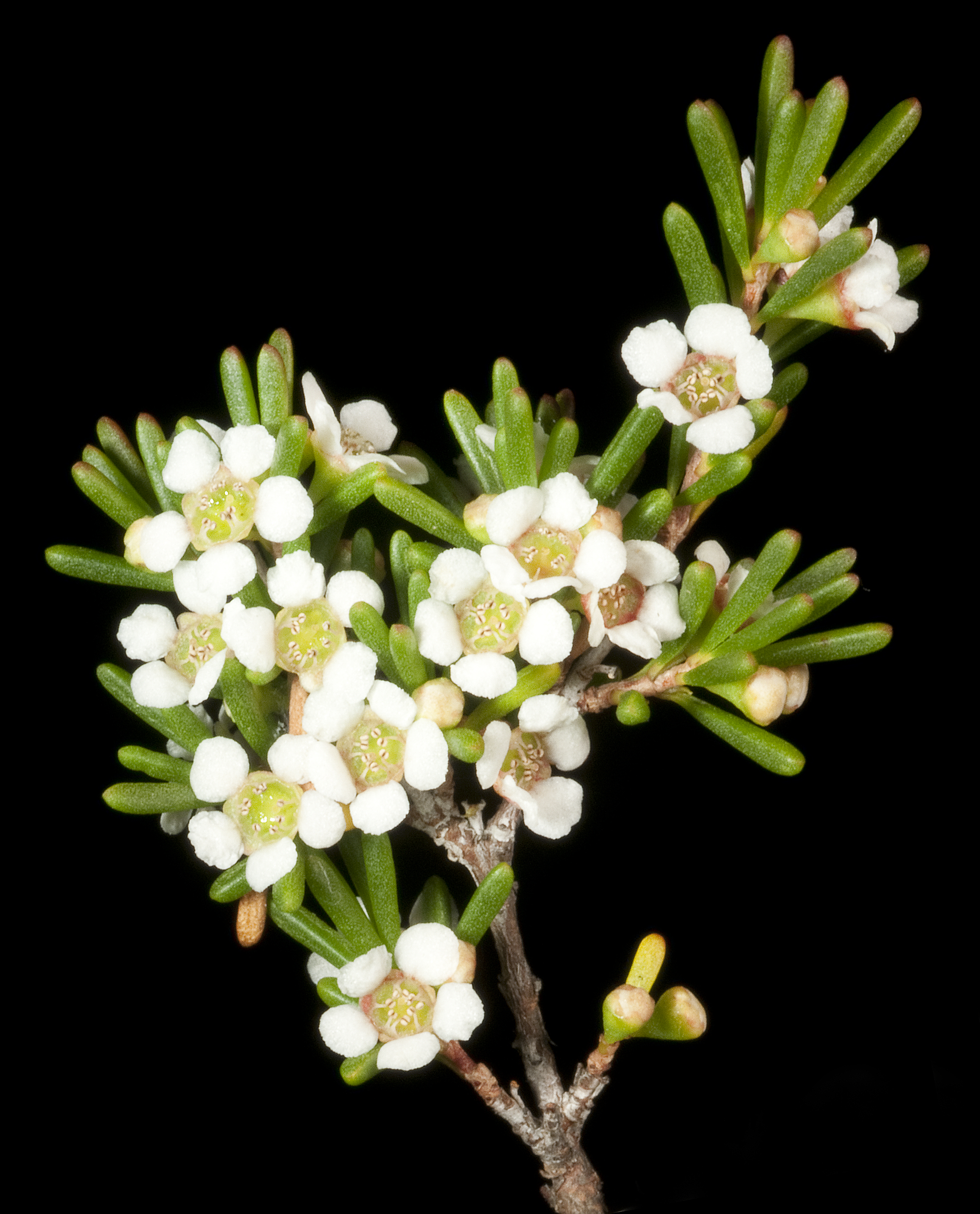
A. sp. Gingalup
