= Astartea corniculata =

Scientific classification
- Kingdom: Plantae
- Clade: Tracheophytes
- Clade: Angiosperms
- Clade: Eudicots
- Clade: Rosids
- Order: Myrtales
- Family: Myrtaceae
- Genus: Astartea
- Species: A. corniculata

Binomial name
- Astartea corniculata Schauer

Species of flowering plant

Astartea corniculata is a shrub endemic to Western Australia.

== Description ==
The open diffuse shrub, which typically grows to a height of 3 meters (9.8 ft), blooms between October and May, producing white-pink flowers, and can thrive in a variety of growing locations, including sandy peat, black sandy clay, and humus-rich soils, as well as quartz sand. It is also versatile in terms of its placement, growing well in flats, slopes, valleys, edges of creeks, swamps and wetlands, and flood plains.

== Ecology ==
It is found along the south coast on flats, slopes, river banks, swamps, wetlands and flood plains in the Great Southern region of Western Australia where it grows in sandy-peaty-clay soils.
