= Astartea granitica =

Conservation status
- Priority Three — Poorly Known Taxa (DEC)

Scientific classification
- Kingdom: Plantae
- Clade: Tracheophytes
- Clade: Angiosperms
- Clade: Eudicots
- Clade: Rosids
- Order: Myrtales
- Family: Myrtaceae
- Genus: Astartea
- Species: A. granitica

Binomial name
- Astartea granitica Rye & Trudgen

Species of flowering plant

Astartea granitica, commonly known as granite astartea, is a shrub endemic to Western Australia.

The shrub is found along the south coast in the South West region of Western Australia.
