= Cyathostemon verrucosus =

Conservation status
- Priority Three — Poorly Known Taxa (DEC)

Scientific classification
- Kingdom: Plantae
- Clade: Tracheophytes
- Clade: Angiosperms
- Clade: Eudicots
- Clade: Rosids
- Order: Myrtales
- Family: Myrtaceae
- Genus: Cyathostemon
- Species: C. verrucosus

Binomial name
- Cyathostemon verrucosus Trudgen & Rye

Species of flowering plant

Cyathostemon verrucosus is a member of the family Myrtaceae endemic to Western Australia.

It is found in an area of the Goldfields-Esperance region of Western Australia between Kalgoorlie and Southern Cross.
