= Astartea aspera =

Scientific classification
- Kingdom: Plantae
- Clade: Tracheophytes
- Clade: Angiosperms
- Clade: Eudicots
- Clade: Rosids
- Order: Myrtales
- Family: Myrtaceae
- Genus: Astartea
- Species: A. aspera

Binomial name
- Astartea aspera Schauer

Species of flowering plant

Astartea aspera, commonly known as rough-stemmed astartea, is a shrub endemic to Western Australia.

The shrub typically grows to a height of 1.5 metres (4.9 ft). It blooms between August and May producing white-pink flowers.

It is found along the south coast on valleys, hills, ridges, river banks and road verges in the Great Southern and Goldfields-Esperance regions of Western Australia where it grows in sandy-loamy-clay soils over limestone or granite.
