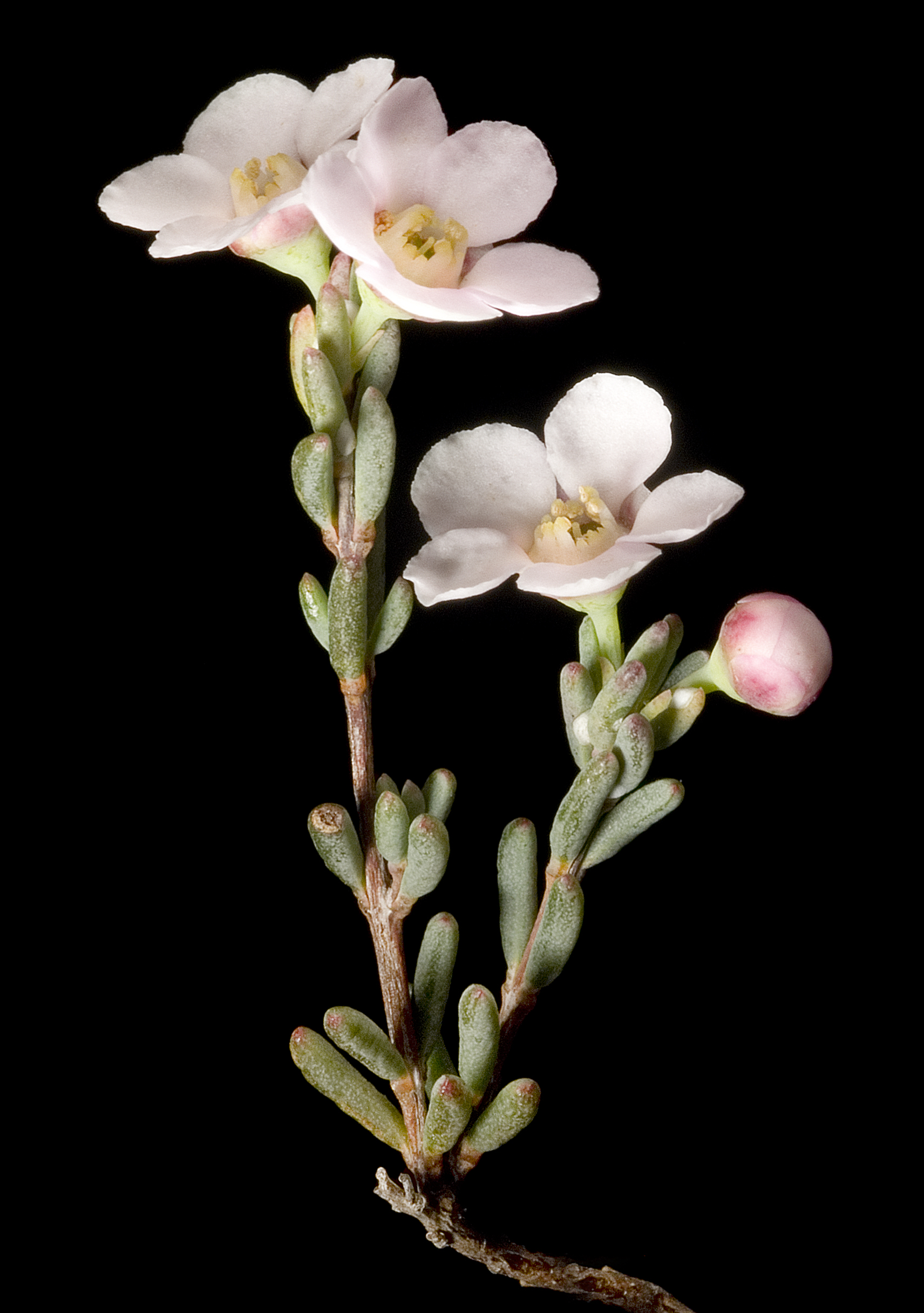
- Cyathostemon heterantherus

Scientific classification
- Kingdom: Plantae
- Clade: Tracheophytes
- Clade: Angiosperms
- Clade: Eudicots
- Clade: Rosids
- Order: Myrtales
- Family: Myrtaceae
- Subfamily: Myrtoideae
- Tribe: Chamelaucieae
- Genus: Cyathostemon; Turcz.

= Cyathostemon =

Genus of flowering plants

Cyathostemon is a genus of flowering plants in the myrtle family, Myrtaceae. The genus is endemic to southwestern Western Australia. It was first described by Nikolai Turczaninow in 1852. Species include:

- Cyathostemon ambiguus (F.Muell.) Rye & Trudgen
- Cyathostemon blackettii (F.Muell.) Rye & Trudgen
- Cyathostemon divaricatus Rye & Trudgen
- Cyathostemon gracilis Rye & Trudgen
- Cyathostemon heterantherus (C.A.Gardner) Rye & Trudgen
- Cyathostemon sp. Dowak
- Cyathostemon sp. Lake King
- Cyathostemon sp. Red Roo Rock
- Cyathostemon sp. Salmon Gums
- Cyathostemon tenuifolius Turcz.
- Cyathostemon verrucosus Rye & Trudgen
