= Astartea zephyra =

Scientific classification
- Kingdom: Plantae
- Clade: Tracheophytes
- Clade: Angiosperms
- Clade: Eudicots
- Clade: Rosids
- Order: Myrtales
- Family: Myrtaceae
- Genus: Astartea
- Species: A. zephyra

Binomial name
- Astartea zephyra Rye & Trudgen

Species of flowering plant

Astartea zephyra is a shrub endemic to Western Australia.

The shrub is found in the South West and southern Wheatbelt regions of Western Australia.
