= Astartea astarteoides =

Scientific classification
- Kingdom: Plantae
- Clade: Tracheophytes
- Clade: Angiosperms
- Clade: Eudicots
- Clade: Rosids
- Order: Myrtales
- Family: Myrtaceae
- Genus: Astartea
- Species: A. astarteoides

Binomial name
- Astartea astarteoides (Benth.) Rye

Species of flowering plant

Astartea astarteoides is a shrub endemic to Western Australia.

The loose spreading shrub typically grows to a height of 1.5 metres (4.9 ft). It blooms between October and November producing white-pink flowers.

It is found along the south coast in wet swampy depressions and road verges in the Goldfields-Esperance region of Western Australia where it grows in sandy-loamy-clay soils over laterite or granite.
