= Astartea cicatricosa =

Scientific classification
- Kingdom: Plantae
- Clade: Tracheophytes
- Clade: Angiosperms
- Clade: Eudicots
- Clade: Rosids
- Order: Myrtales
- Family: Myrtaceae
- Genus: Astartea
- Species: A. cicatricosa

Binomial name
- Astartea cicatricosa Rye & Trudgen

Species of flowering plant

Astartea cicatricosa is a shrub endemic to Western Australia.

It is found along the south coast in the Goldfields-Esperance regions of Western Australia.

== Etymology ==
The species epithet, cicatricosa, derives from the Latin cicatricosus ("full of scars"), and refer to the pitting the seeds' surface.
