= Cyathostemon divaricatus =

Conservation status
- Priority One — Poorly Known Taxa (DEC)

Scientific classification
- Kingdom: Plantae
- Clade: Tracheophytes
- Clade: Angiosperms
- Clade: Eudicots
- Clade: Rosids
- Order: Myrtales
- Family: Myrtaceae
- Genus: Cyathostemon
- Species: C. divaricatus

Binomial name
- Cyathostemon divaricatus Rye & Trudgen

Species of flowering plant

Cyathostemon divaricatus is a member of the family Myrtaceae endemic to Western Australia.

It is found in a small area in the Goldfields-Esperance region of Western Australia near Coolgardie.
