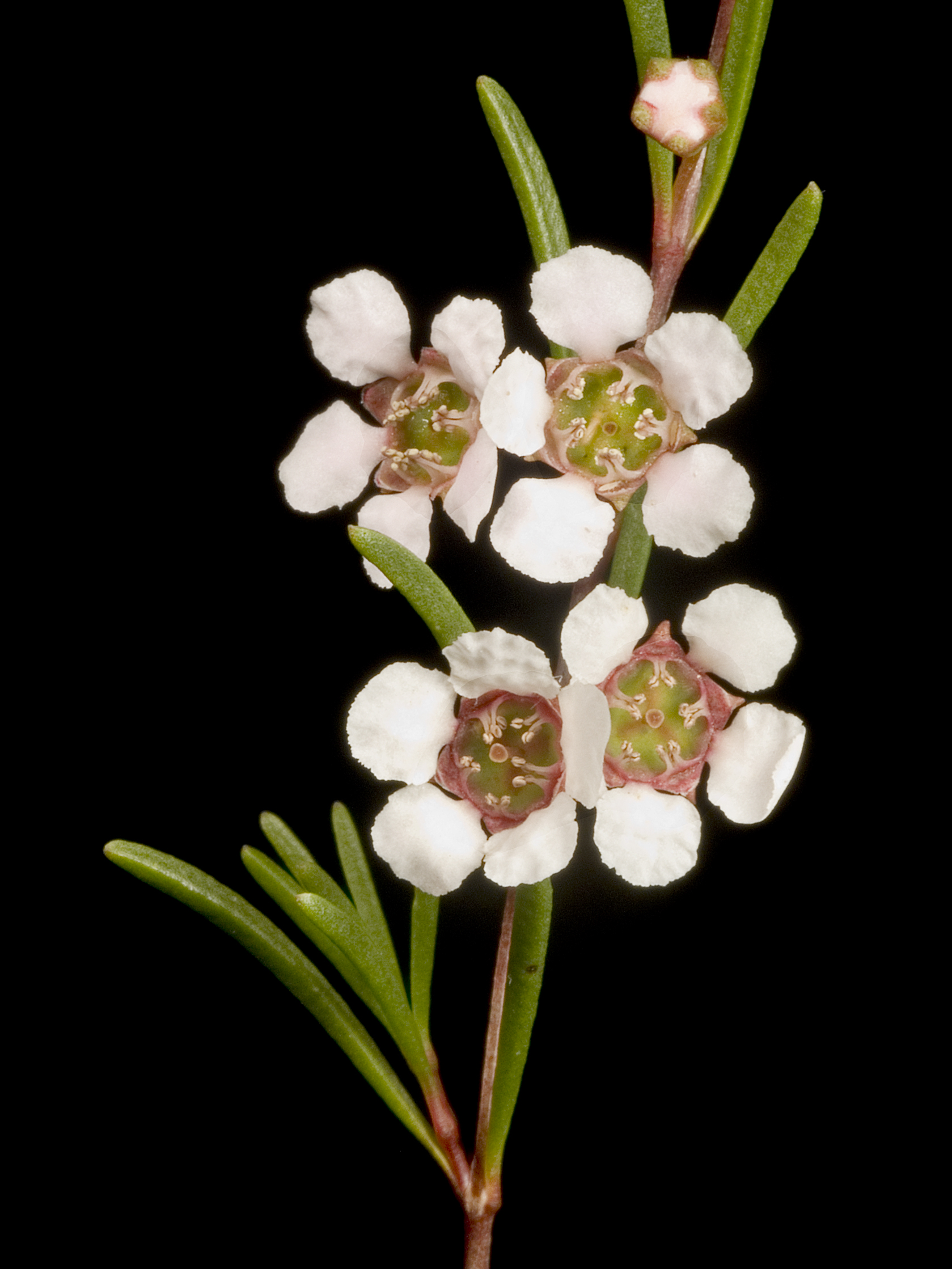

Conservation status
- Least Concern (IUCN 3.1)

Scientific classification
- Kingdom: Plantae
- Clade: Tracheophytes
- Clade: Angiosperms
- Clade: Eudicots
- Clade: Rosids
- Order: Myrtales
- Family: Myrtaceae
- Genus: Astartea
- Species: A. affinis

Binomial name
- Astartea affinis (Endl.) Rye

Synonyms
- Astartea endlicheriana S.Schauer, nom. illeg. superfl.; Baeckea affinis Endl.; Leptospermum dubium Spreng.

= Astartea affinis =

Species of flowering plant

Astartea affinis, commonly known as west-coast astartea, is a shrub endemic to Western Australia.

The slender, erect and open shrub typically grows to a height of 2 to 4 metres (7 to 13 ft). It blooms between November and January producing white-purple-violet flowers.

It is found along the west coast on undulating sites, seasonal wetlands, roadsides, creeklines and claypans in the Peel and South West regions of Western Australia where it grows in sandy-clay-peaty soils.
