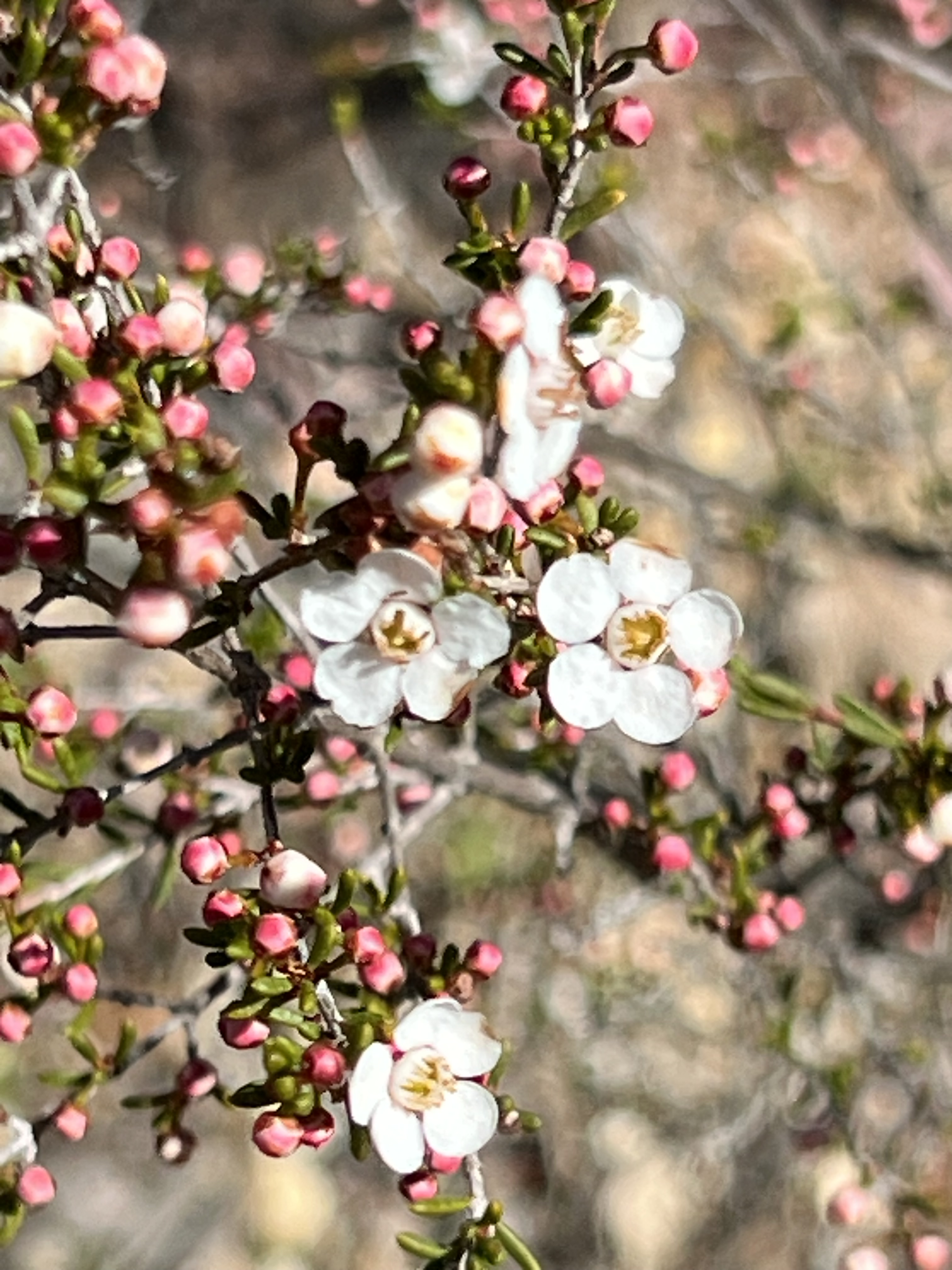

Scientific classification
- Kingdom: Plantae
- Clade: Tracheophytes
- Clade: Angiosperms
- Clade: Eudicots
- Clade: Rosids
- Order: Myrtales
- Family: Myrtaceae
- Genus: Cyathostemon
- Species: C. tenuifolius

Binomial name
- Cyathostemon tenuifolius Turcz.

= Cyathostemon tenuifolius =

Species of flowering plant

Cyathostemon tenuifolius is a member of the family Myrtaceae endemic to Western Australia.

The upright shrub typically grows to a height of 0.9 metres (3 ft). It blooms between September and November producing white flowers.

Often found around swamps, along creek banks, on gentle slopes or on breakaways along the south coast in the Great Southern and Goldfields-Esperance regions of Western Australia where it grows in sandy-loamy or sandy-clay soils over granite or spongolite.
