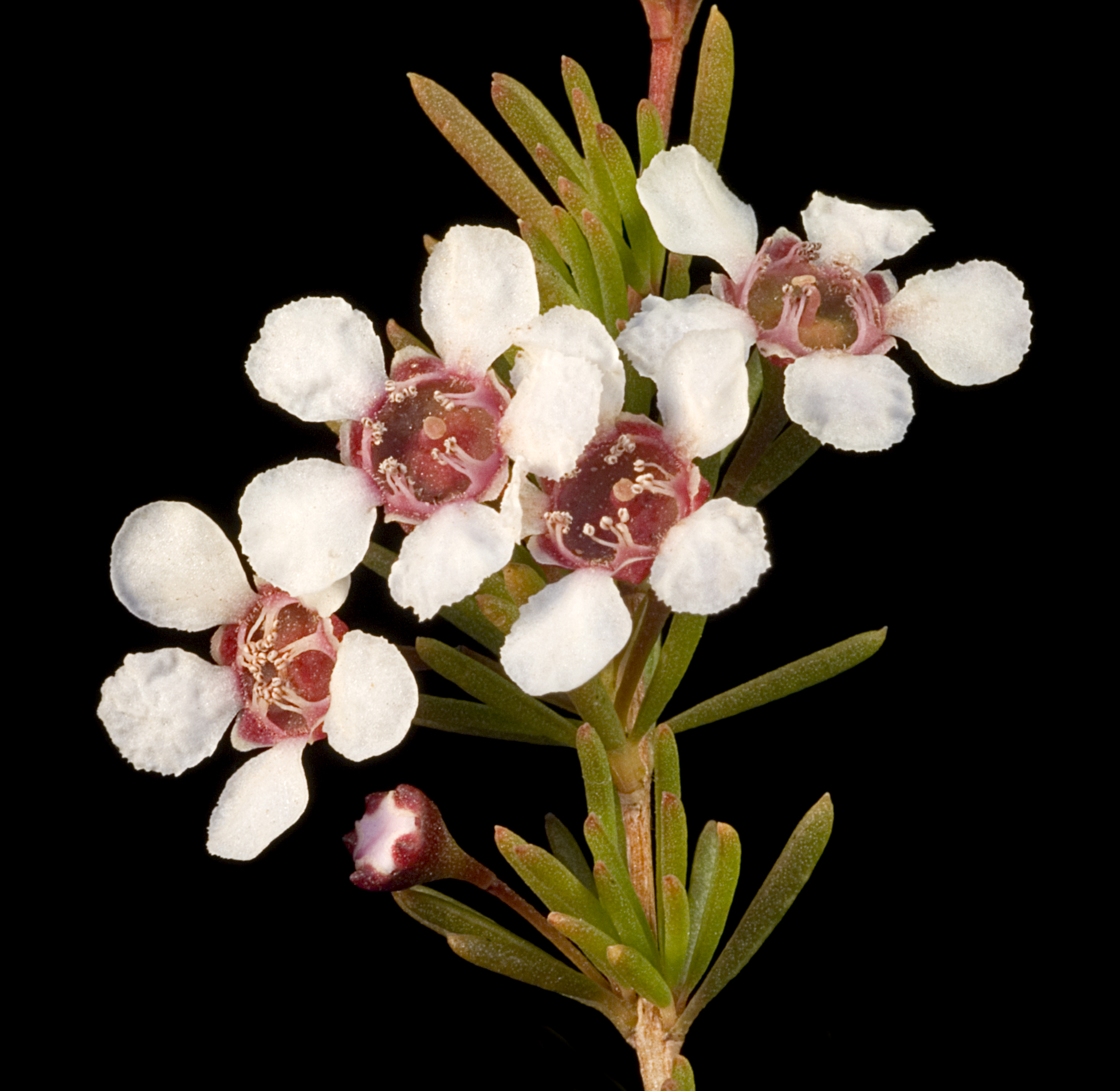

Scientific classification
- Kingdom: Plantae
- Clade: Tracheophytes
- Clade: Angiosperms
- Clade: Eudicots
- Clade: Rosids
- Order: Myrtales
- Family: Myrtaceae
- Genus: Astartea
- Species: A. schaueri

Binomial name
- Astartea schaueri Rye & Trudgen

= Astartea schaueri =

Species of flowering plant

Astartea schaueri is a shrub endemic to Western Australia.

The shrub is found along the south coast in the South West and Great Southern regions of Western Australia.
