= Astartea onycis =

Scientific classification
- Kingdom: Plantae
- Clade: Tracheophytes
- Clade: Angiosperms
- Clade: Eudicots
- Clade: Rosids
- Order: Myrtales
- Family: Myrtaceae
- Genus: Astartea
- Species: A. onycis

Binomial name
- Astartea onycis Rye and Trudgen

Species of flowering plant

Astartea onycis, commonly known as clawed astartea, is a shrub endemic to Western Australia.

The shrub is found in the South West region of Western Australia.
