= Cyathostemon gracilis =

Conservation status
- Priority Two — Poorly Known Taxa (DEC)

Scientific classification
- Kingdom: Plantae
- Clade: Tracheophytes
- Clade: Angiosperms
- Clade: Eudicots
- Clade: Rosids
- Order: Myrtales
- Family: Myrtaceae
- Genus: Cyathostemon
- Species: C. gracilis

Binomial name
- Cyathostemon gracilis Rye & Trudgen

Species of flowering plant

Cyathostemon gracilis is a member of the family Myrtaceae endemic to Western Australia.

It is found in a small area on the south coast in the Great Southern region of Western Australia near Ravensthorpe.
