= Astartea arbuscula =

Scientific classification
- Kingdom: Plantae
- Clade: Tracheophytes
- Clade: Angiosperms
- Clade: Eudicots
- Clade: Rosids
- Order: Myrtales
- Family: Myrtaceae
- Genus: Astartea
- Species: A. arbuscula

Binomial name
- Astartea arbuscula (Benth.) Rye

Species of flowering plant

Astartea arbuscula, commonly known as minute astartea, is a shrub endemic to Western Australia.

== Description ==
The spreading, single-stemmed shrub typically grows to a height of 0.25 metres (0.8 ft). It blooms between January and March producing white-pink flowers.

== Distribution ==
It is found along the south coast on flats, plains, seasonal wetlands and valley floors in the Great Southern and South West regions of Western Australia where it grows in sandy-clay-peaty soils.
