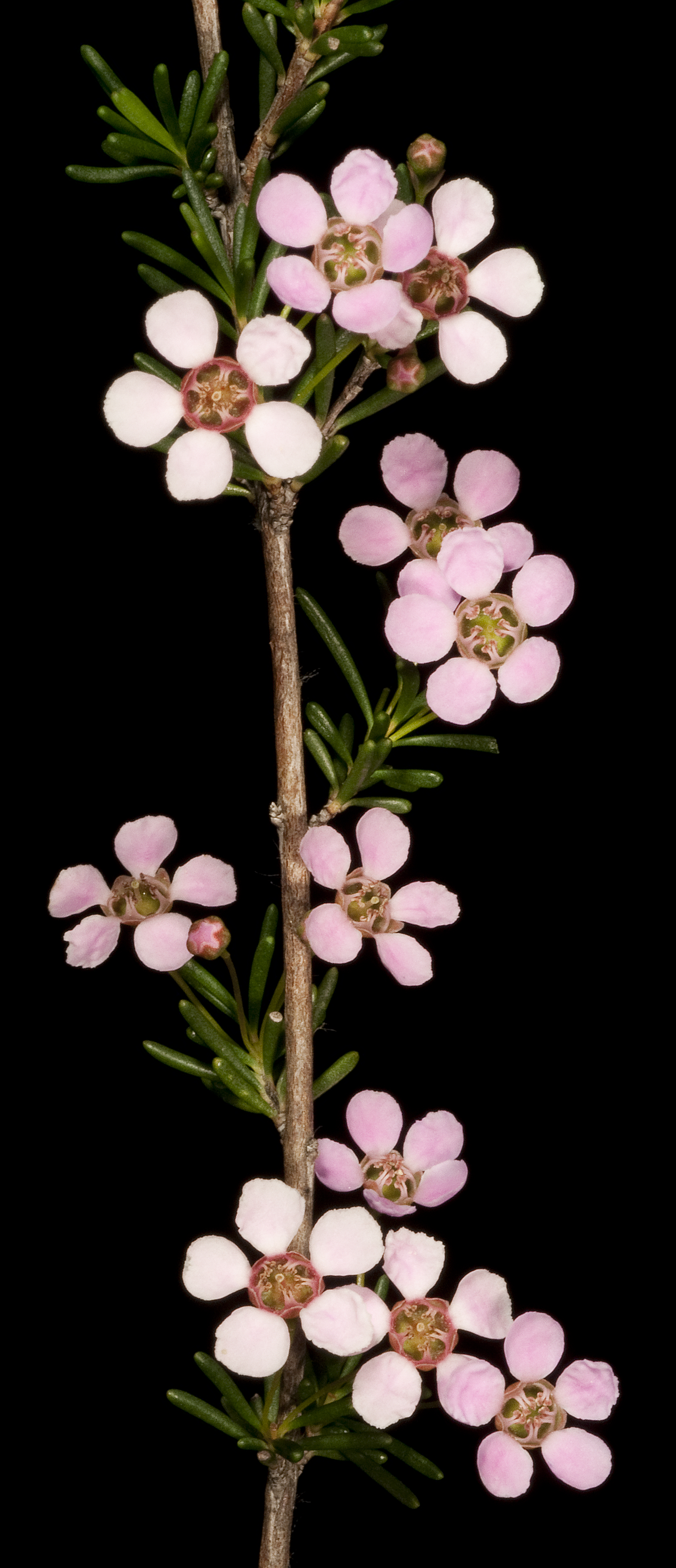

Scientific classification
- Kingdom: Plantae
- Clade: Tracheophytes
- Clade: Angiosperms
- Clade: Eudicots
- Clade: Rosids
- Order: Myrtales
- Family: Myrtaceae
- Genus: Astartea
- Species: A. glomerulosa

Binomial name
- Astartea glomerulosa Schauer

= Astartea glomerulosa =

Species of flowering plant

Astartea glomerulosa, commonly known as early astartea, is a shrub endemic to Western Australia.

== Description and Distribution ==
The compact shrub typically grows to a height of 1.0 metre (3.3 ft). It blooms between October and April producing white-pink flowers.

It is found along the south coast on slopes, river banks and disturbed sites in the South West and Great Southern regions of Western Australia where it grows in sandy-loamy-clay soils over spongelite.
