= Astartea transversa =

Conservation status
- Priority Two — Poorly Known Taxa (DEC)

Scientific classification
- Kingdom: Plantae
- Clade: Tracheophytes
- Clade: Angiosperms
- Clade: Eudicots
- Clade: Rosids
- Order: Myrtales
- Family: Myrtaceae
- Genus: Astartea
- Species: A. transversa

Binomial name
- Astartea transversa Rye

Species of flowering plant

Astartea transversa is a shrub endemic to Western Australia.

The shrub is found along the south coast in the Great Southern region of Western Australia around Albany.
