= Astartea muricata =

Scientific classification
- Kingdom: Plantae
- Clade: Tracheophytes
- Clade: Angiosperms
- Clade: Eudicots
- Clade: Rosids
- Order: Myrtales
- Family: Myrtaceae
- Genus: Astartea
- Species: A. muricata

Binomial name
- Astartea muricata Turcz.

Species of flowering plant

Astartea muricata, commonly known as inland astartea, is a shrub endemic to Western Australia.

== Description ==
The shrub typically grows to a height of 1.0 metre (3.3 ft). It blooms between October and November producing white-pink flowers.

== Distribution ==
It is found on seasonally wet flats and river flats in the Wheatbelt region of Western Australia where it grows in sandy-clay soils.
