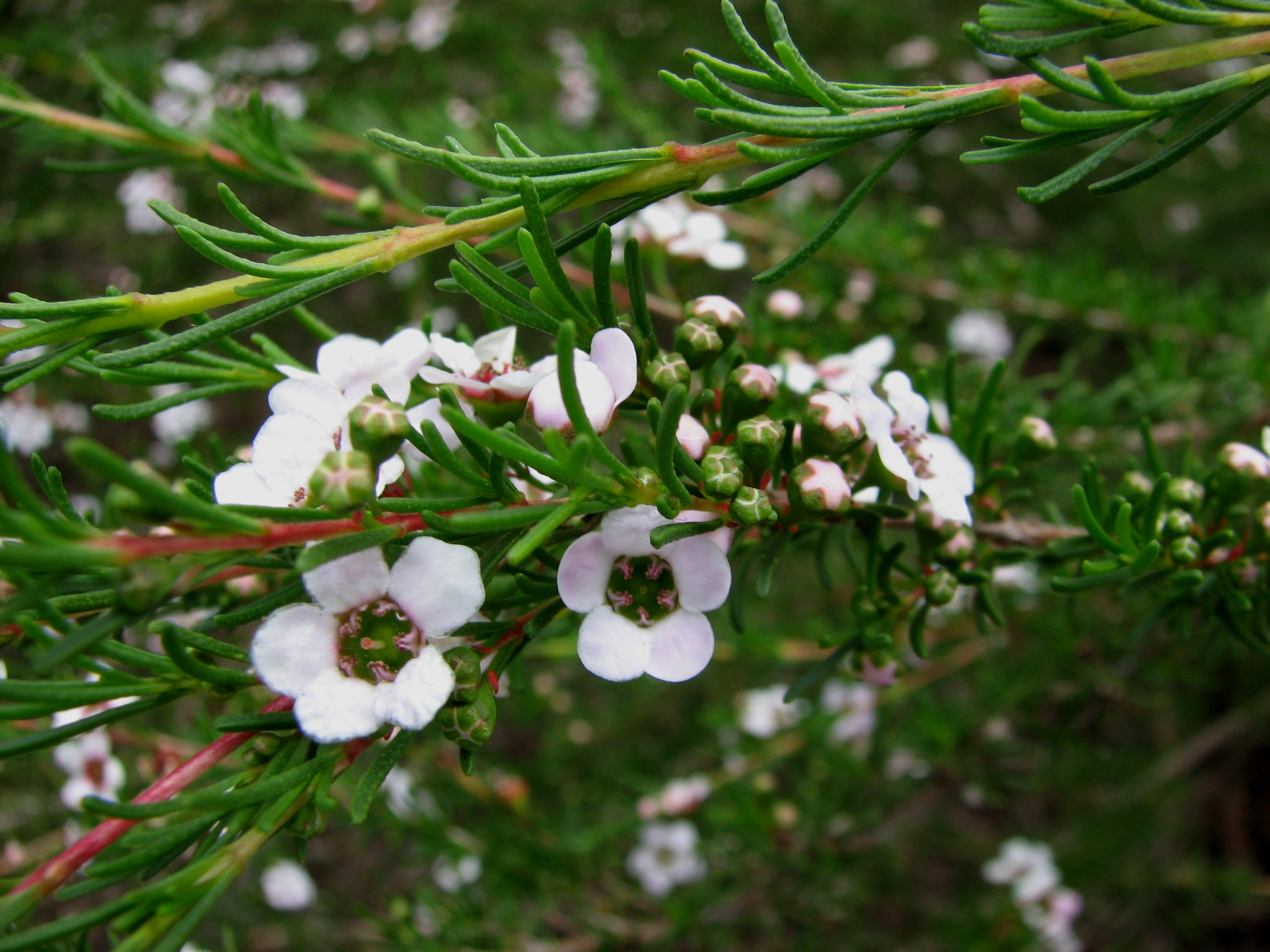

Scientific classification
- Kingdom: Plantae
- Clade: Tracheophytes
- Clade: Angiosperms
- Clade: Eudicots
- Clade: Rosids
- Order: Myrtales
- Family: Myrtaceae
- Genus: Astartea
- Species: A. fascicularis

Binomial name
- Astartea fascicularis (Labill.) DC.

= Astartea fascicularis =

Species of flowering plant

Astartea fascicularis is a species of flowering plant in the myrtle family, Myrtaceae. It is endemic to southwestern Western Australia, where it is widespread in the Recherche Archipelago and present on the mainland in Cape Le Grand National Park. It is commonly known as Recherche astartea. or false baeckea.

== Description ==
This species is a shrub usually reaching up to 1.5 metres tall at windy sites and about 3 metres in maximum height in sheltered areas. It may have single or multiple stems and may layer. New stems are reddish in colour and ridged or winged. Older stems are grey, developing reddish and grey stripes, and more deeply ridged. The leaves are often arranged in fascicles. The leaf blades may be as thick or thicker than they are wide, and reach 1.2 centimetres long. The flowers are paired along the branches. The petals are usually white, or sometimes pale pink. The flower contains clusters of several stamens and usually a few staminodes. The fruit capsule is 2 or 3 millimetres long.

== Distribution ==
It has a scattered distribution in the South West, Great Southern and Goldfields-Esperance regions of Western Australia where it is often found along watercourses and in winter wet depressions growing in sandy and lateritic soils.

This shrub grows on granite substrates. It occurs in exposed coastal habitat and more protected inland scrubs.
