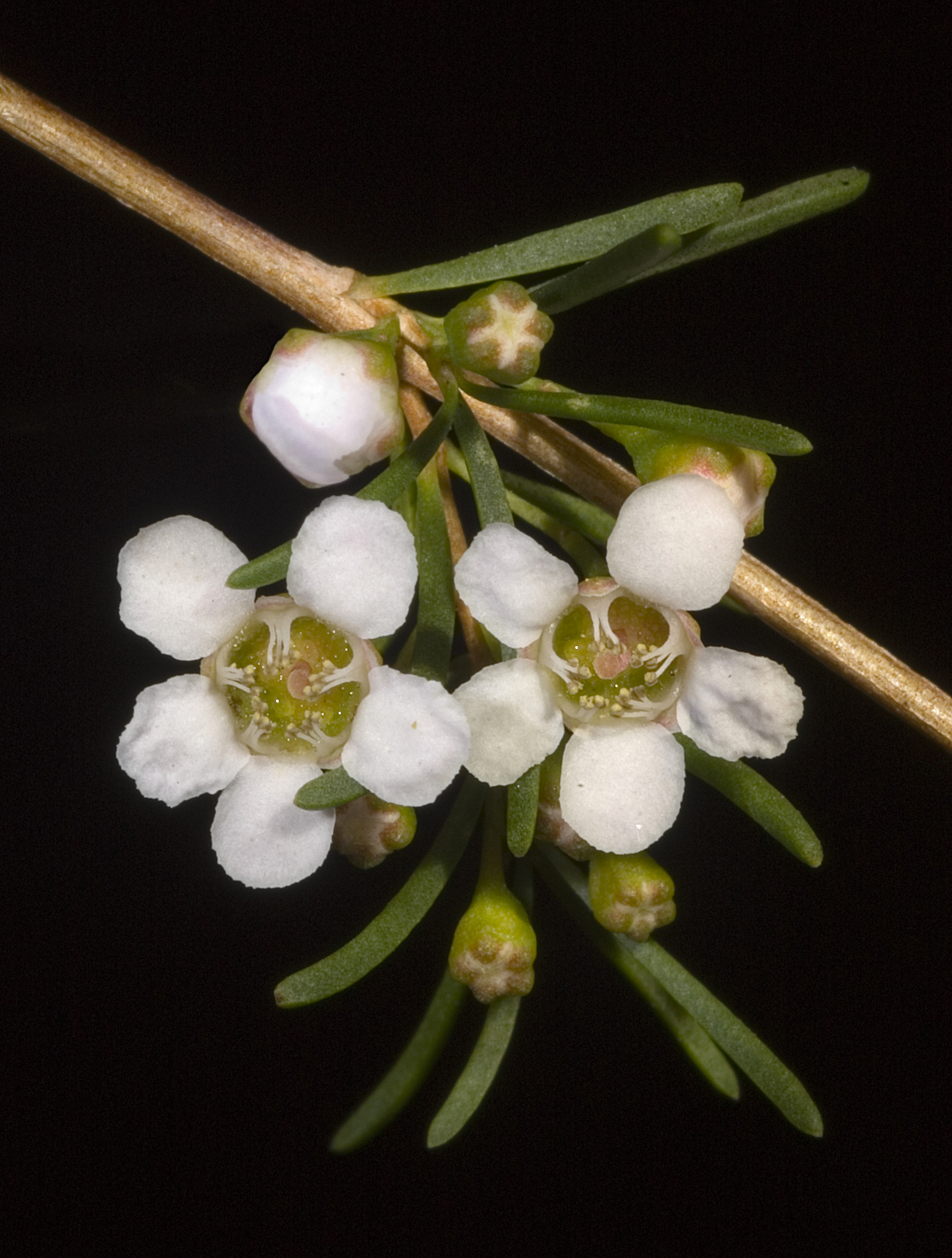

Scientific classification
- Kingdom: Plantae
- Clade: Tracheophytes
- Clade: Angiosperms
- Clade: Eudicots
- Clade: Rosids
- Order: Myrtales
- Family: Myrtaceae
- Genus: Astartea
- Species: A. scoparia

Binomial name
- Astartea scoparia Schauer

= Astartea scoparia =

Species of flowering plant

Astartea scoparia, commonly known as common astartea, is a shrub endemic to Western Australia.

The shrub typically grows to a height of 1.8 metres (5.9 ft) and produces white flowers.

It is found along the coast of the Peel, South West and Great Southern regions of Western Australia where it grows in sandy-loamy soils.
