= Astartea leptophylla =

Conservation status
- Least Concern (IUCN 3.1)

Scientific classification
- Kingdom: Plantae
- Clade: Tracheophytes
- Clade: Angiosperms
- Clade: Eudicots
- Clade: Rosids
- Order: Myrtales
- Family: Myrtaceae
- Genus: Astartea
- Species: A. leptophylla

Binomial name
- Astartea leptophylla Schauer

Species of flowering plant

Astartea leptophylla, commonly known as river-bank astartea, is a species of flowering plant endemic to Western Australia.

The spreading tree or shrub can grow to a height of 5 metres (16.4 ft). It blooms between December and March producing white flowers.

It is found along the south coast on river valleys, river banks, floodways, seasonally wet sites and estuaries in the South West and Great Southern regions of Western Australia where it grows in sandy-loamy soils over granite.
