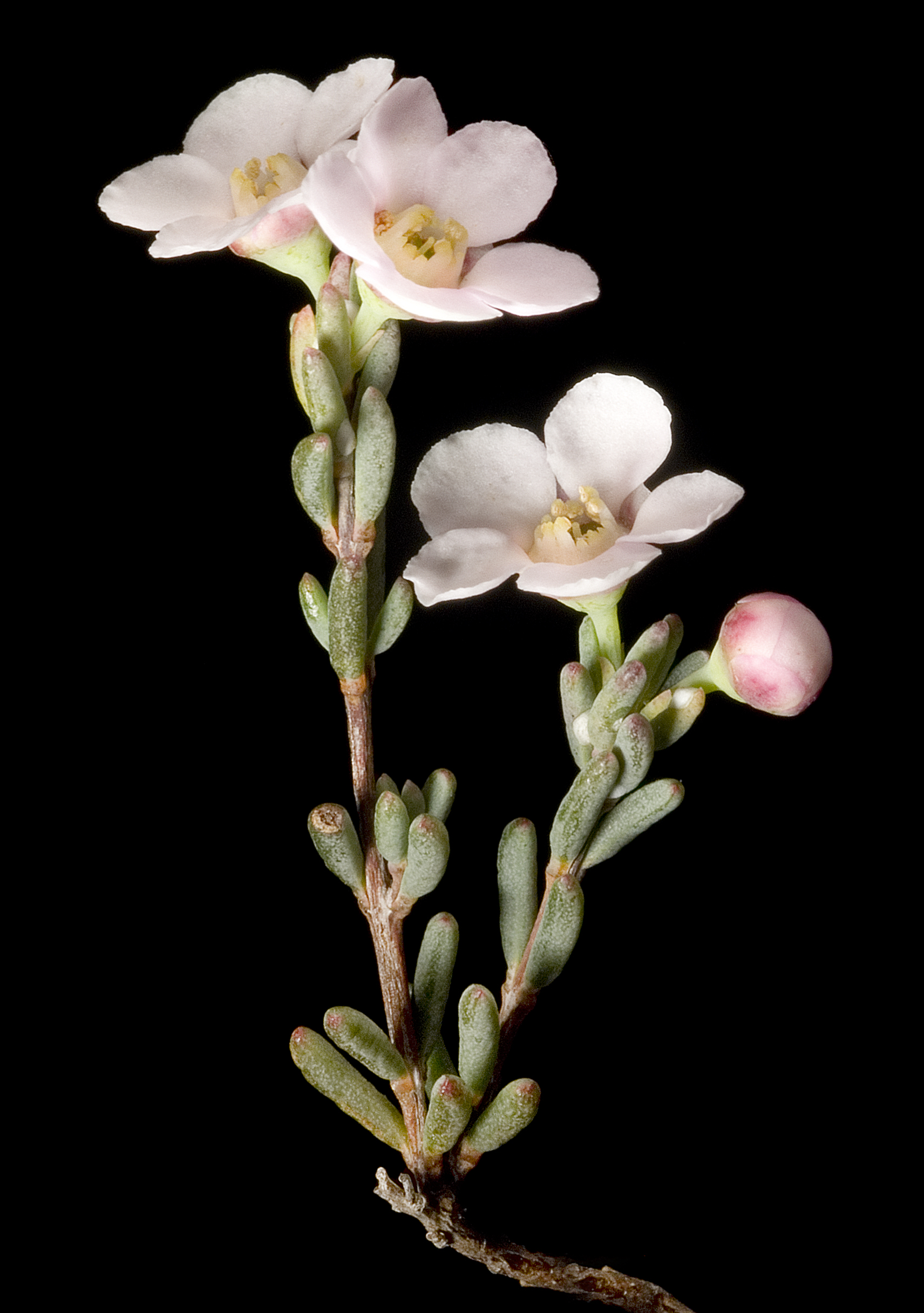

Scientific classification
- Kingdom: Plantae
- Clade: Tracheophytes
- Clade: Angiosperms
- Clade: Eudicots
- Clade: Rosids
- Order: Myrtales
- Family: Myrtaceae
- Genus: Cyathostemon
- Species: C. heterantherus

Binomial name
- Cyathostemon heterantherus (C.A.Gardner) Rye & Trudgen

= Cyathostemon heterantherus =

Species of flowering plant

Cyathostemon heterantherus is a member of the family Myrtaceae endemic to Western Australia.

It is found in a large area in the Wheatbelt region of Western Australia.
