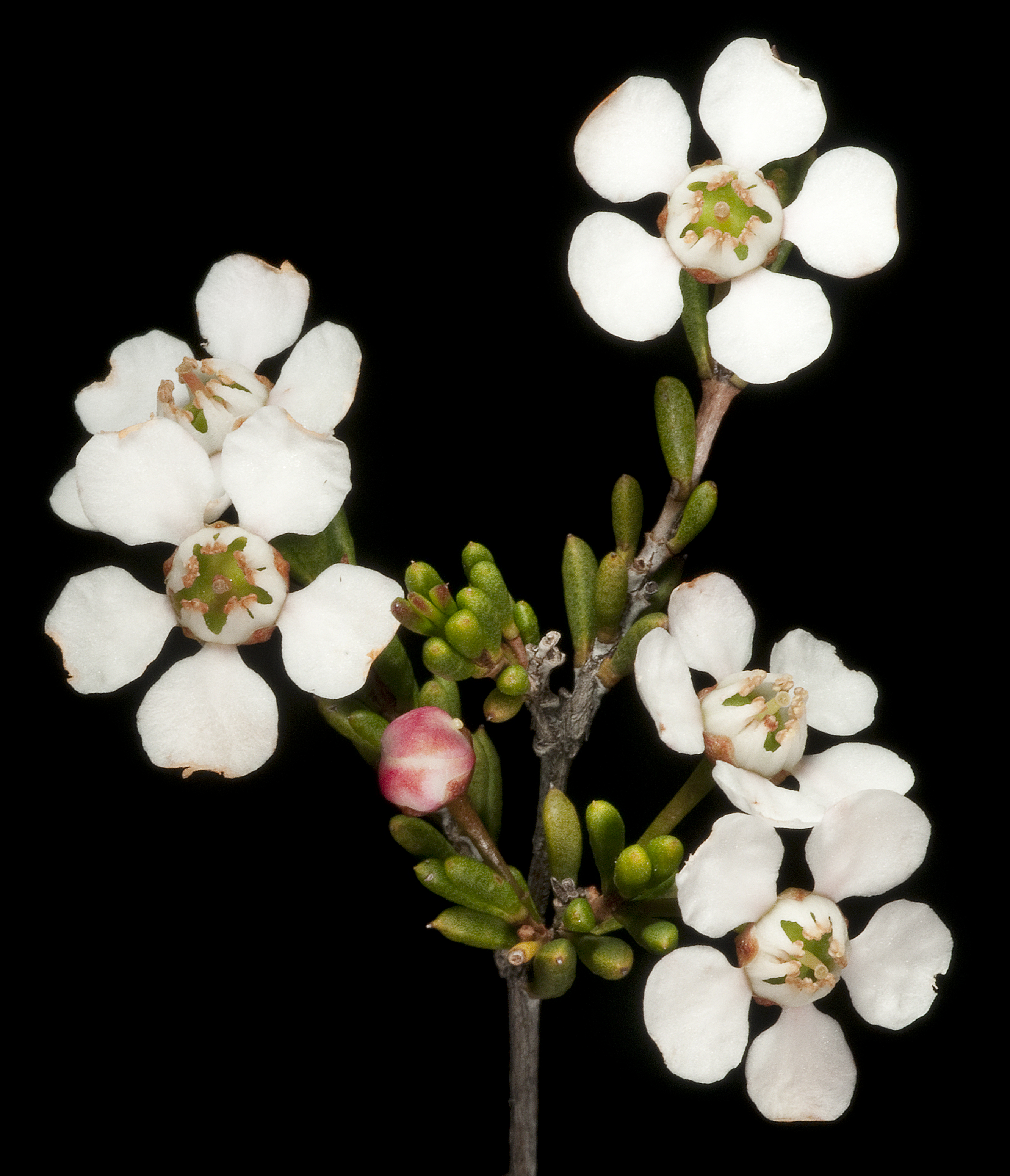

Scientific classification
- Kingdom: Plantae
- Clade: Tracheophytes
- Clade: Angiosperms
- Clade: Eudicots
- Clade: Rosids
- Order: Myrtales
- Family: Myrtaceae
- Genus: Cyathostemon
- Species: C. ambiguus

Binomial name
- Cyathostemon ambiguus (F.Muell.) Rye & Trudgen

= Cyathostemon ambiguus =

Species of flowering plant

Cyathostemon ambiguus is a member of the family Myrtaceae endemic to Western Australia.

It is found in an area along the south coast extending from the Great Southern and into the south western Goldfields-Esperance regions of Western Australia.

== Taxonomy ==
Cyathostemon ambiguus was first described in 1869 by Ferdinand von Mueller as Astartea ambigua, but in 2012 was transferred to the genus, Cyathostemon, by Barbara Rye and Malcolm Trudgen.
