= Nyceryx draudti =

Scientific classification
- Domain: Eukaryota
- Kingdom: Animalia
- Phylum: Arthropoda
- Class: Insecta
- Order: Lepidoptera
- Family: Sphingidae
- Genus: Nyceryx
- Species: N. draudti

Binomial name
- Nyceryx draudti Gehlen, 1926

Species of moth

Nyceryx draudti is a moth of the family Sphingidae. It is known from Peru.

The wingspan is about 67 mm. It is very similar to Nyceryx stuarti.

Adults are probably on wing year round.
