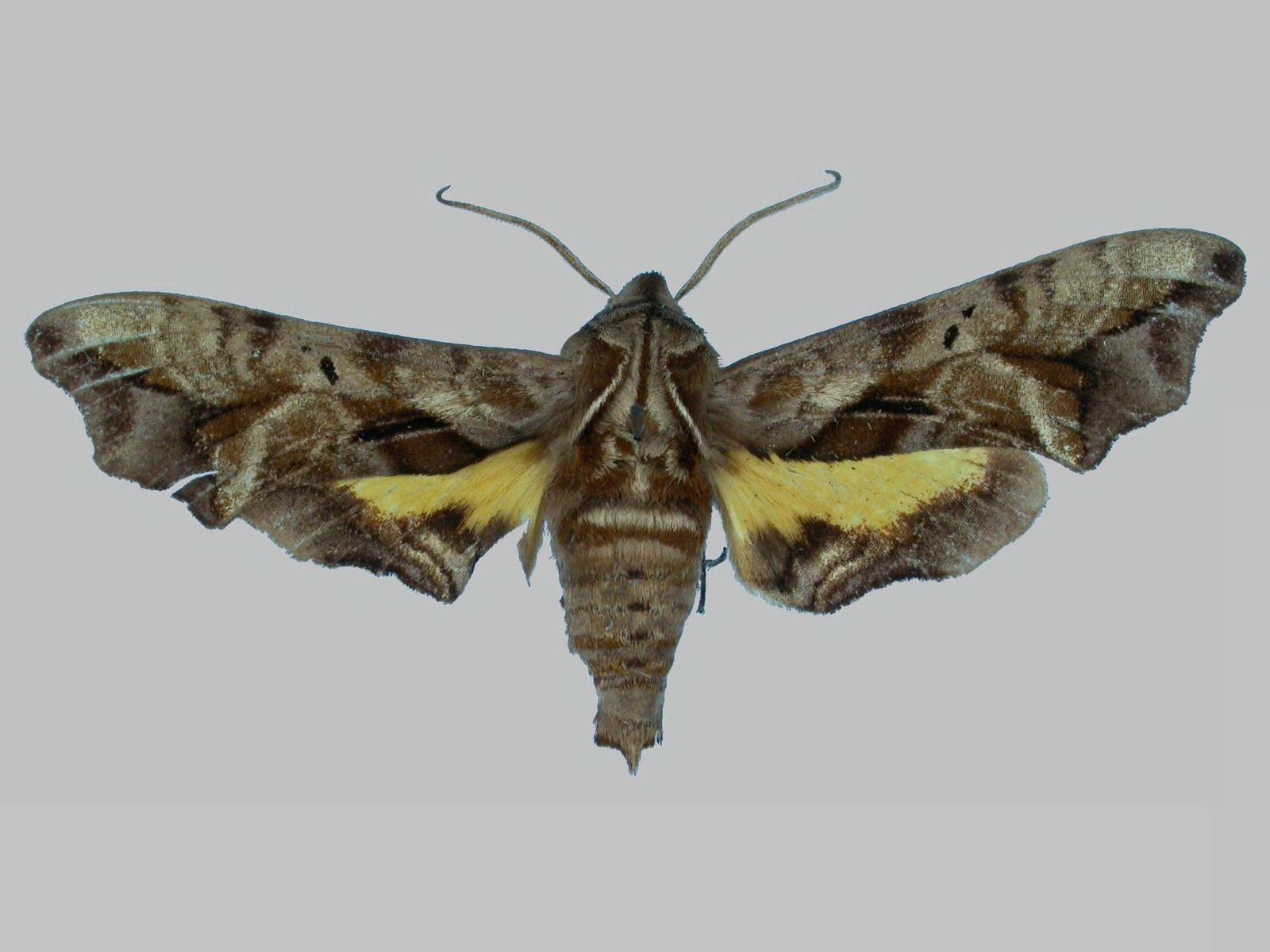

Scientific classification
- Domain: Eukaryota
- Kingdom: Animalia
- Phylum: Arthropoda
- Class: Insecta
- Order: Lepidoptera
- Family: Sphingidae
- Genus: Nyceryx
- Species: N. nephus

Binomial name
- Nyceryx nephus (Boisduval, 1875)

Synonyms
- Perigonia nephus Boisduval, 1875

= Nyceryx nephus =

Species of moth

Nyceryx nephus is a moth of the family Sphingidae. It is known from Brazil.

The forewing and hindwing upperside is similar to Nyceryx alophus alophus, but the marginal band on the hindwing upperside is broader and has traces of brown spots.

Adults are probably on wing year round.
