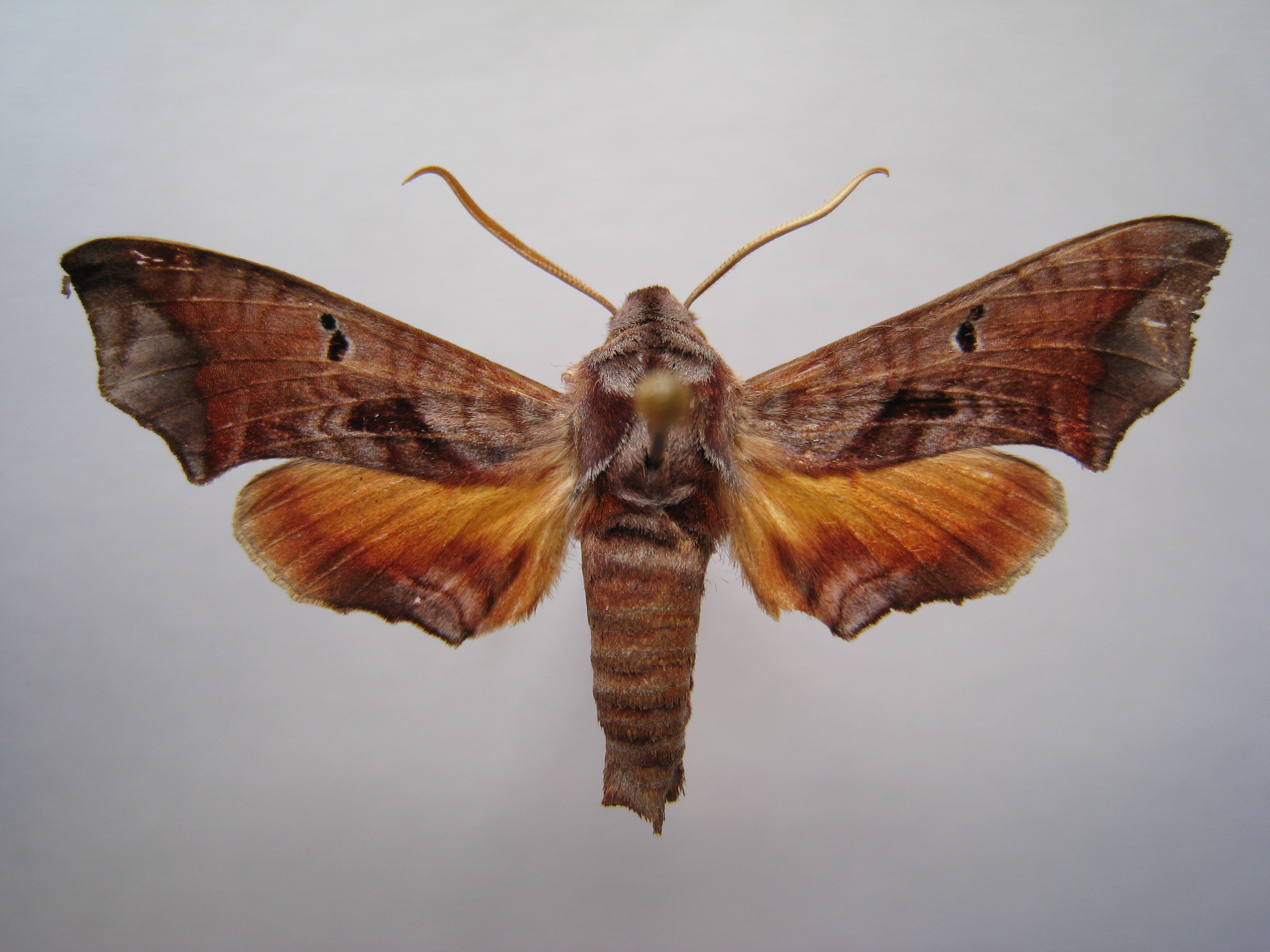

Scientific classification
- Domain: Eukaryota
- Kingdom: Animalia
- Phylum: Arthropoda
- Class: Insecta
- Order: Lepidoptera
- Family: Sphingidae
- Genus: Nyceryx
- Species: N. mielkei

Binomial name
- Nyceryx mielkei Haxaire, 2009

= Nyceryx mielkei =

Species of moth

Nyceryx mielkei is a moth of the family Sphingidae. It is known from Brazil.
