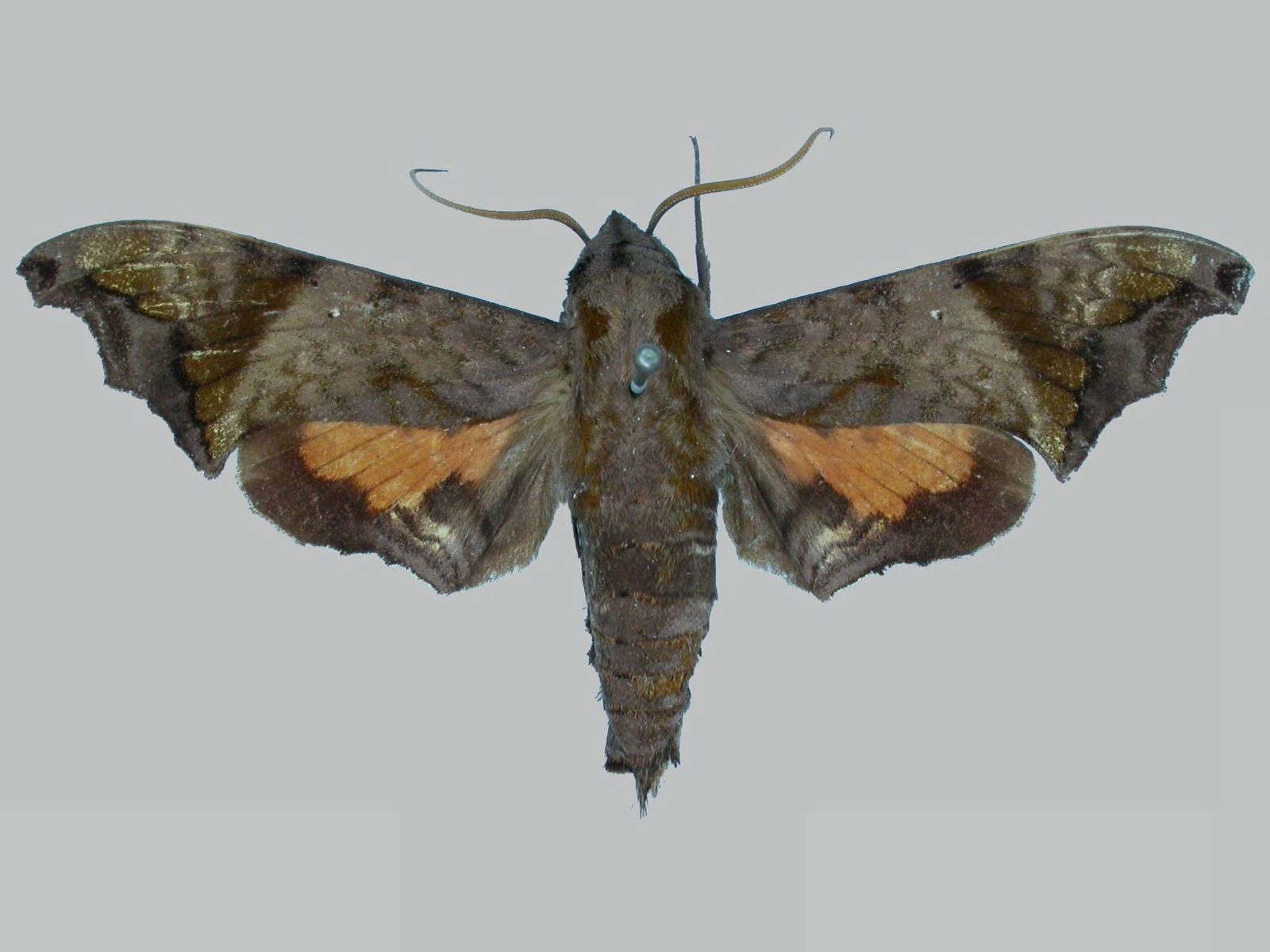

Scientific classification
- Domain: Eukaryota
- Kingdom: Animalia
- Phylum: Arthropoda
- Class: Insecta
- Order: Lepidoptera
- Family: Sphingidae
- Genus: Nyceryx
- Species: N. nictitans

Binomial name
- Nyceryx nictitans (Boisduval, 1875)

Synonyms
- Perigonia nictitans Boisduval, 1875; Perigonia subaurea Köhler, 1924; Nyceryx nictitans bryki Gehlen, 1929

= Nyceryx nictitans =

Species of moth

Nyceryx nictitans is a moth of the family Sphingidae. It is found from Brazil to Argentina and in Peru and Bolivia.

It can be distinguished from other Nyceryx species by the hindwing upperside, which has an orange base, a dark brown marginal band of even width and the lack of semitransparent spots. There are two or three thin, black, but distinct lines on the underside of the abdomen.

Adults are probably on wing year round.

The larvae have been recorded feeding on Aspidosperma macrocarpa.

== Subspecies ==
- Nyceryx nictitans nictitans (Brazil to Argentina)
- Nyceryx nictitans saturata Rothschild & Jordan, 1903 (Peru and Bolivia)
