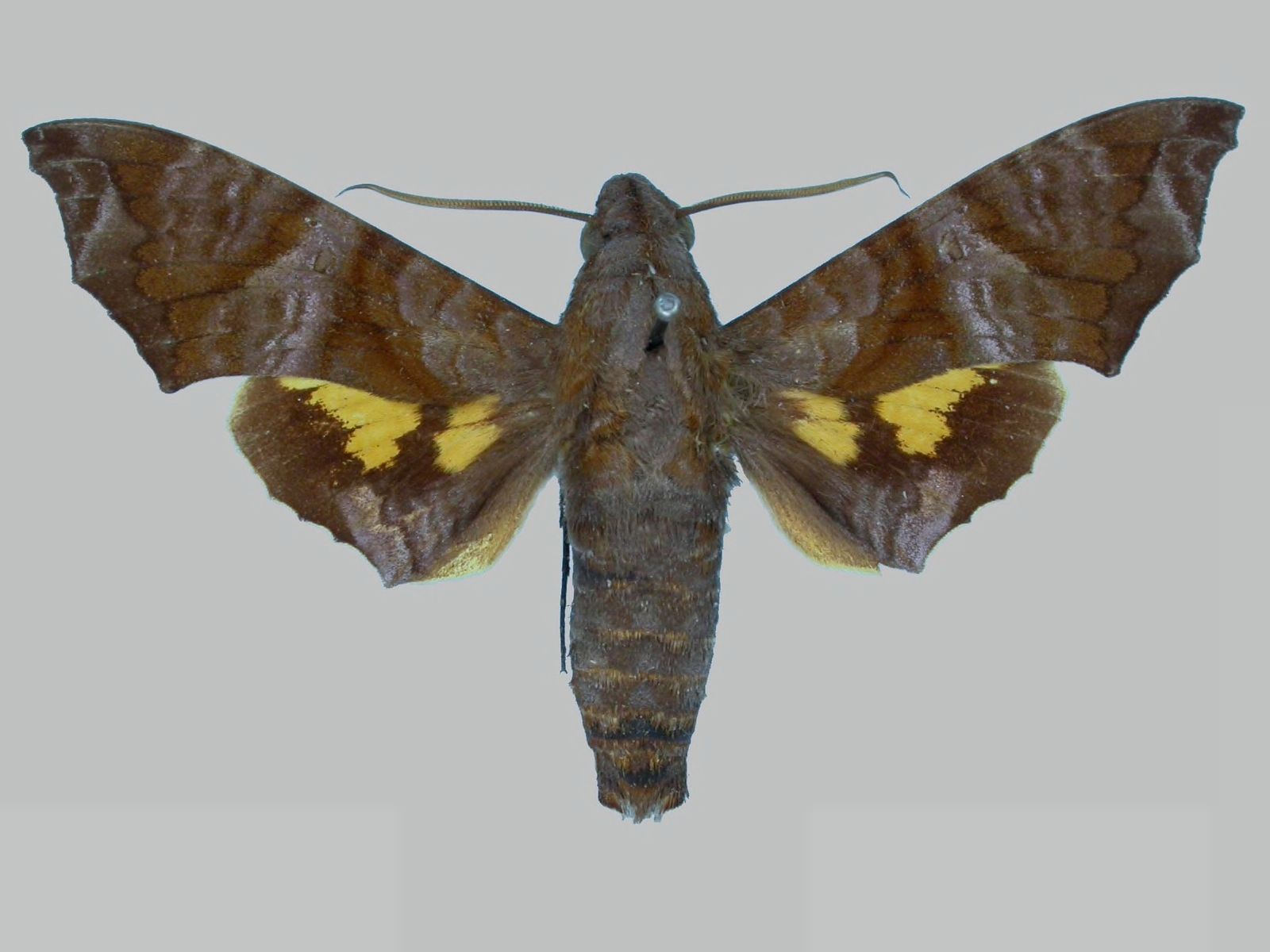

Scientific classification
- Domain: Eukaryota
- Kingdom: Animalia
- Phylum: Arthropoda
- Class: Insecta
- Order: Lepidoptera
- Family: Sphingidae
- Genus: Nyceryx
- Species: N. coffaeae

Binomial name
- Nyceryx coffaeae (Walker, 1856)

Synonyms
- Perigonia coffaeae Walker, 1856; Pachygonia boisduvalii Butler, 1876; Macroglossa abboti Schaufuss, 1870

= Nyceryx coffaeae =

Species of moth

Nyceryx coffaeae is a moth of the family Sphingidae. It is found from Mexico, Belize, Guatemala and Costa Rica into South America, where it is known from Brazil, Colombia, Ecuador and Bolivia.

The wingspan is 68–69 mm. It can be distinguished from all other Nyceryx species by the dark brown band dividing the yellow basal area of the hindwing upperside.

Adults are probably on wing year round.

The larvae feed on Calycophyllum candidissimum.
