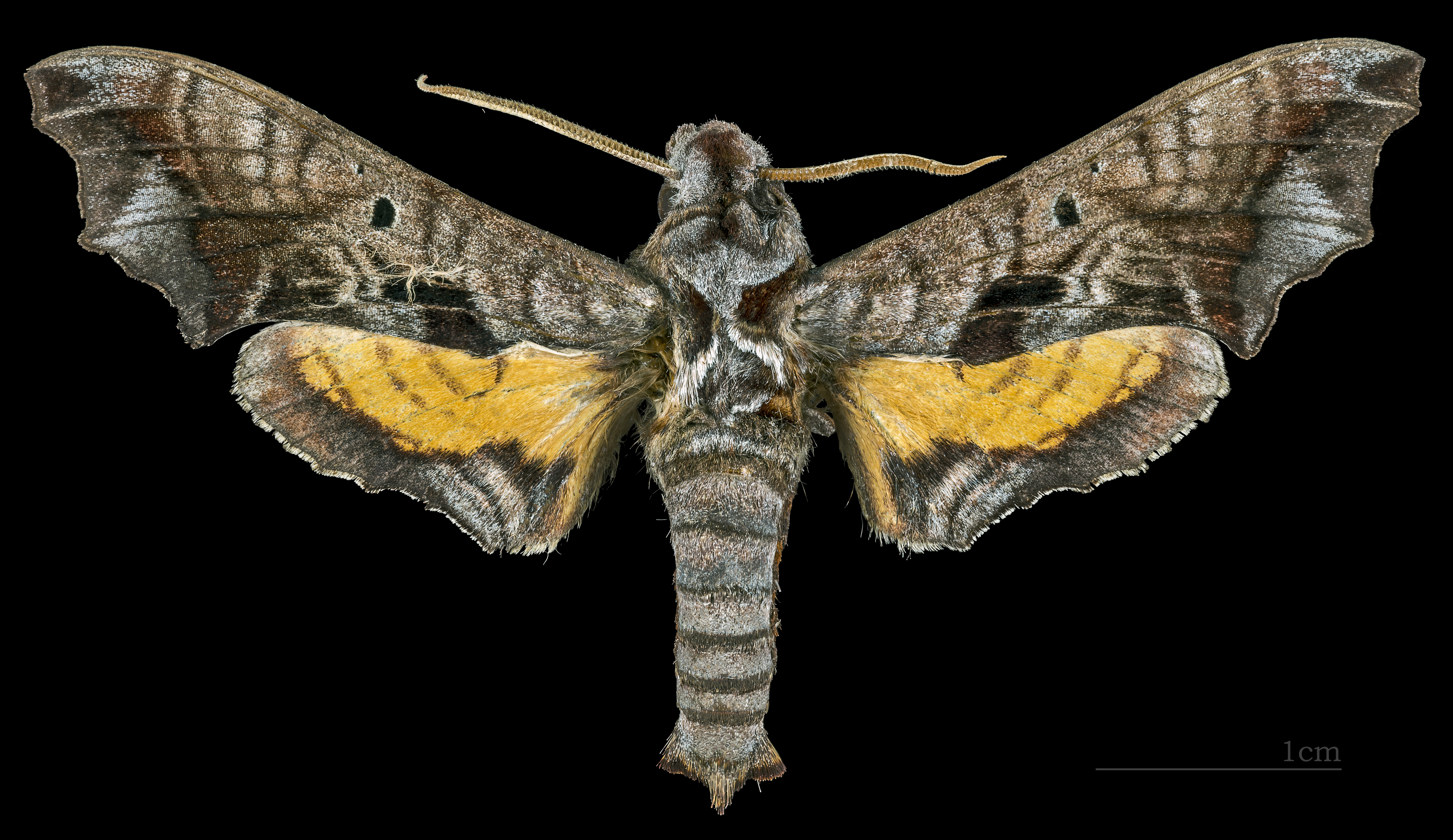
- Nyceryx furtadoi Male dorsal
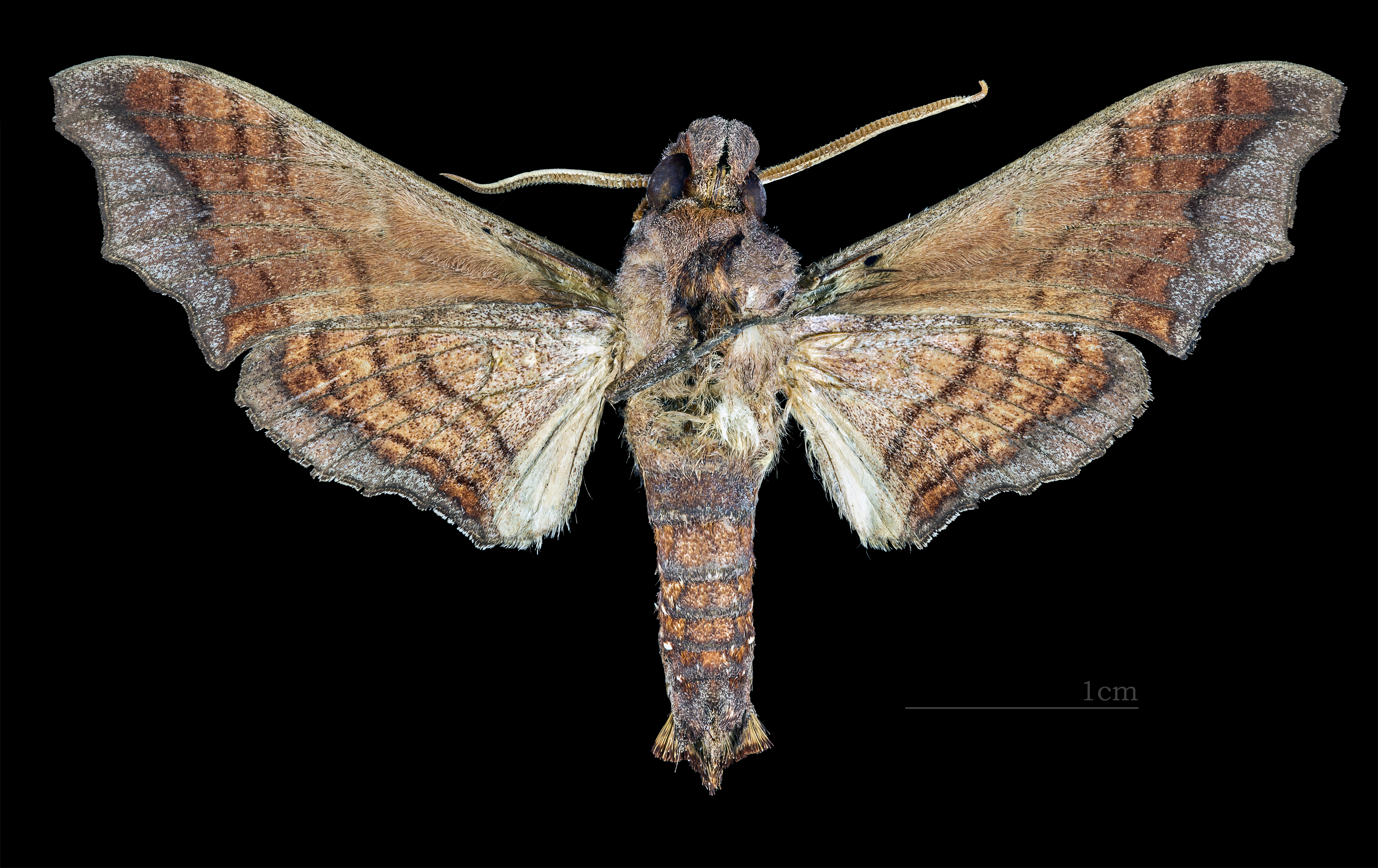
- Nyceryx furtadoi Male ventral

Scientific classification
- Domain: Eukaryota
- Kingdom: Animalia
- Phylum: Arthropoda
- Class: Insecta
- Order: Lepidoptera
- Family: Sphingidae
- Genus: Nyceryx
- Species: N. furtadoi

Binomial name
- Nyceryx furtadoi Haxaire, 1996

= Nyceryx furtadoi =

Species of moth

Nyceryx furtadoi is a moth of the family Sphingidae. It is known from Brazil, Bolivia and Paraguay. It is possibly also found in Argentina.

The wingspan is about 60 mm.

Adults are probably on wing year round and have been recorded from September to October in Brazil and in August in Paraguay.
