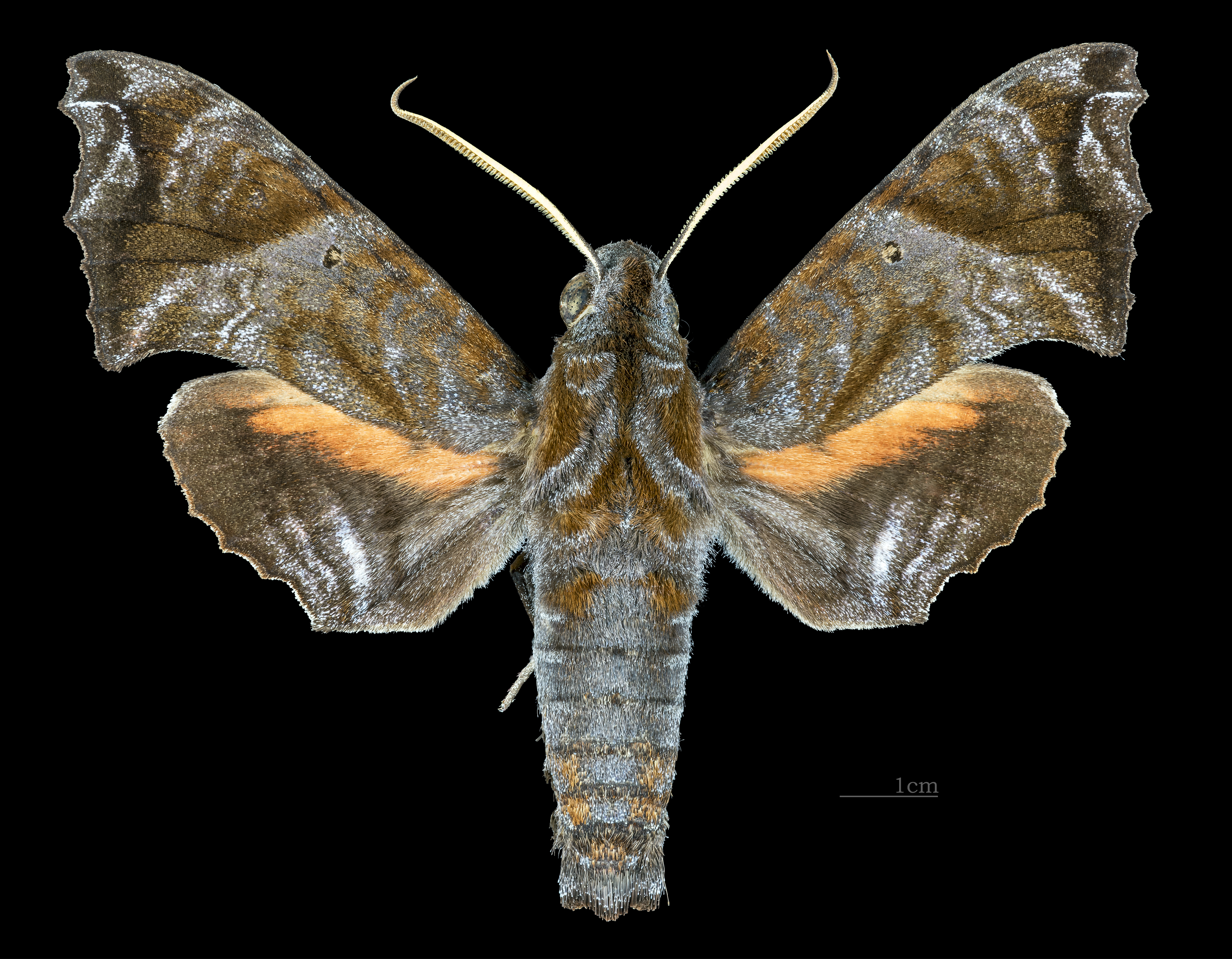
- Male dorsal
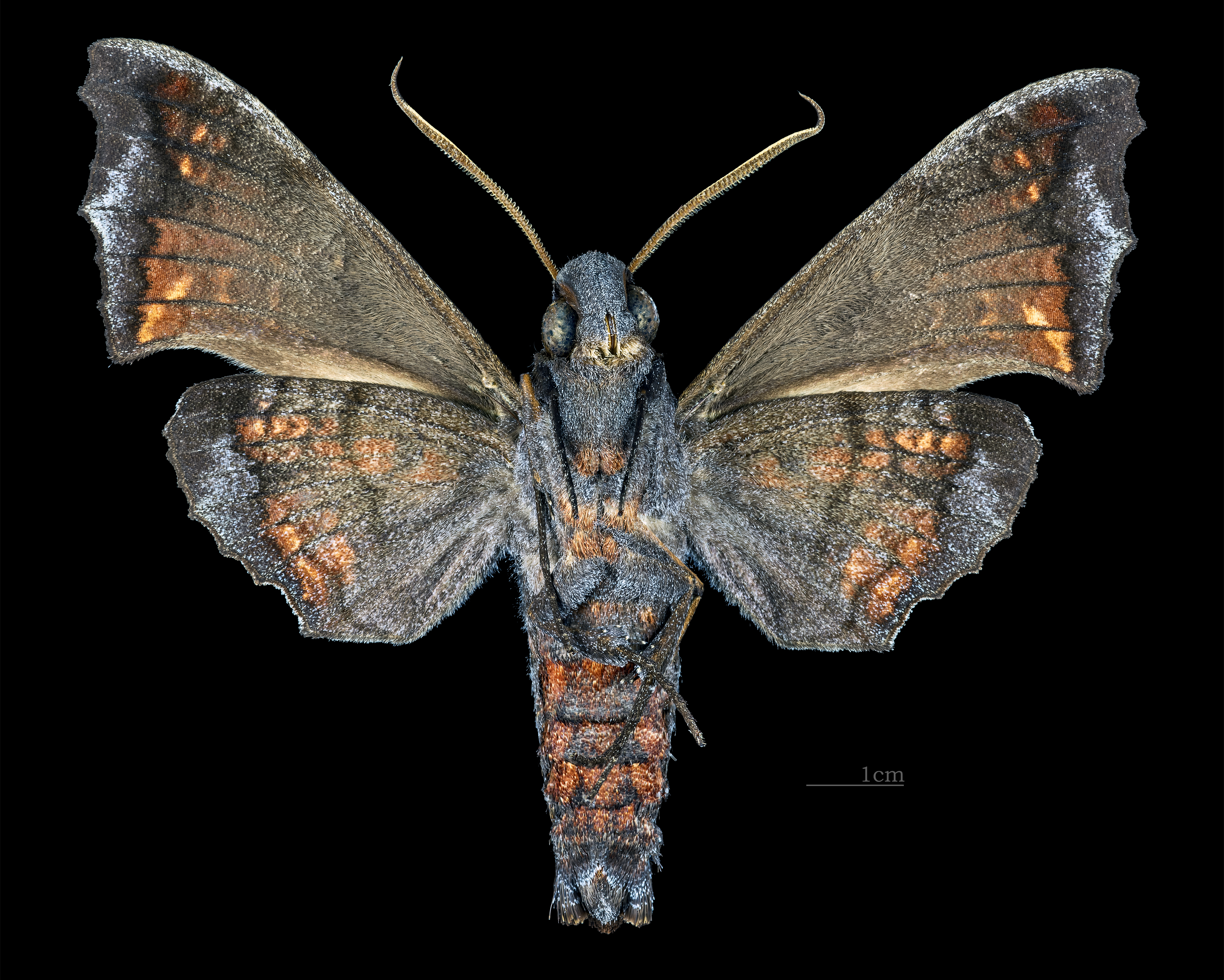
- Male ventral

Scientific classification
- Domain: Eukaryota
- Kingdom: Animalia
- Phylum: Arthropoda
- Class: Insecta
- Order: Lepidoptera
- Family: Sphingidae
- Genus: Nyceryx
- Species: N. magna

Binomial name
- Nyceryx magna (R Felder, 1874)

Synonyms
- Perigonia magna R Felder, 1874

= Nyceryx magna =

Species of moth

Nyceryx magna is a moth of the family Sphingidae.

== Distribution ==
It is known from Brazil, Costa Rica and Ecuador.

== Description ==
It can be distinguished from other Nyceryx species by the dark forewing upperside and the brownish-orange basal area and pale purple bands in the tornal angle of the hindwing upperside.

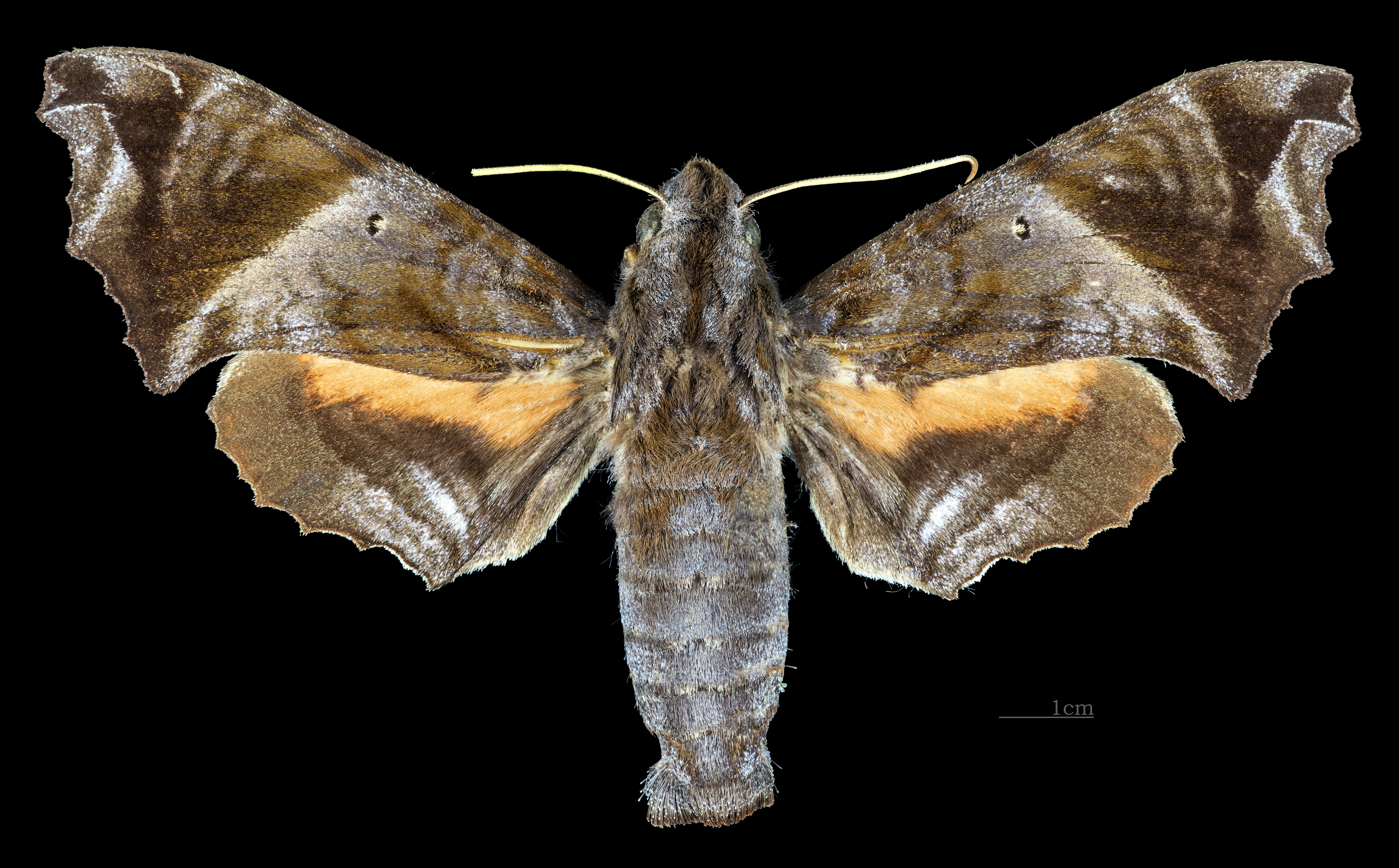
Female dorsal

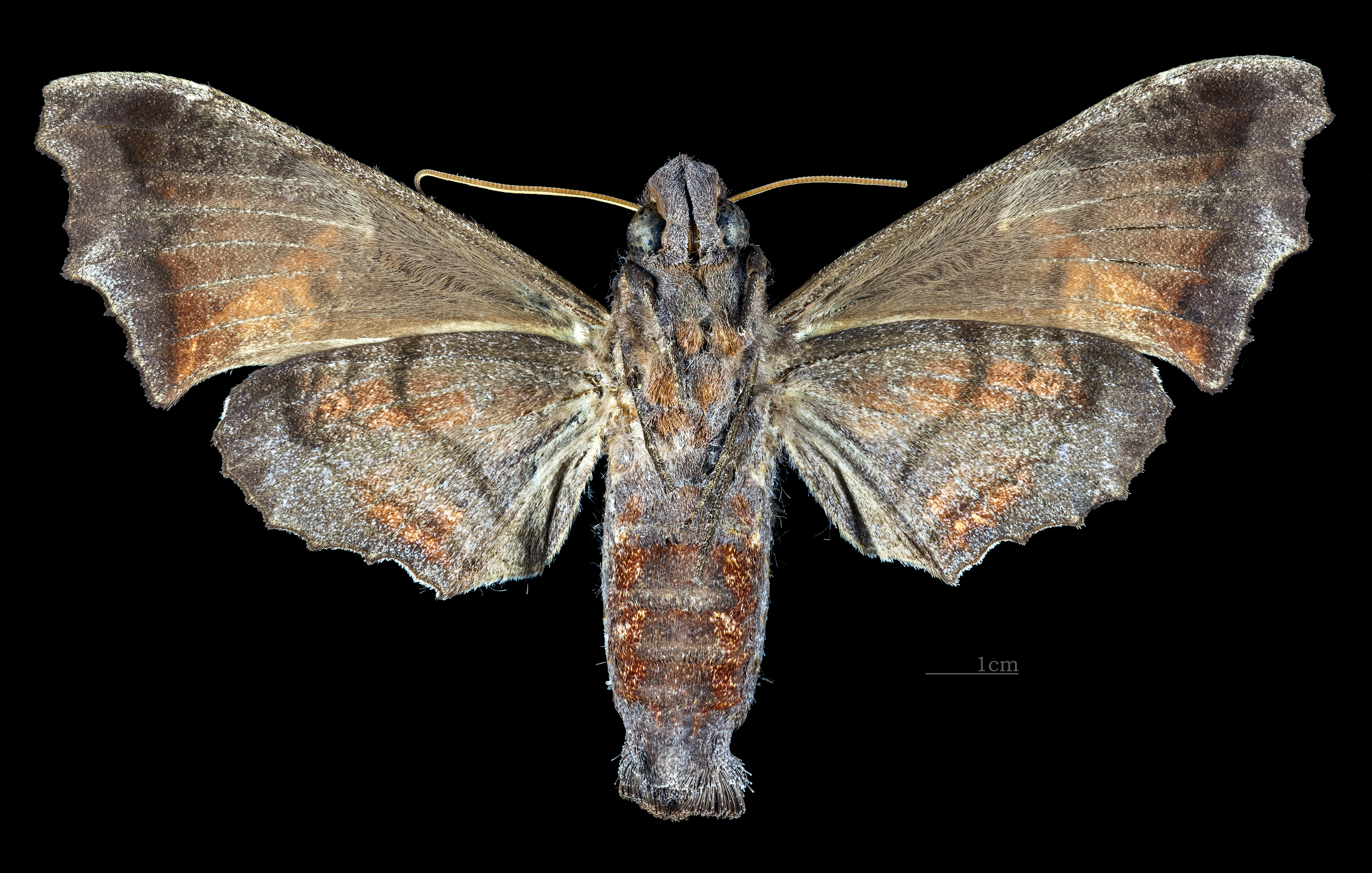
Female ventral

== Biology ==
Adults are on wing year round.

The larvae feed on Pentagonia donnell-smithii. Early instar larvae have very large heads and elongated tails. The head has a distinctive blue-green colour in the final instar and the tail is shorter and rough. The pupa is smooth and shiny with alternating light and dark bands on the abdomen.
