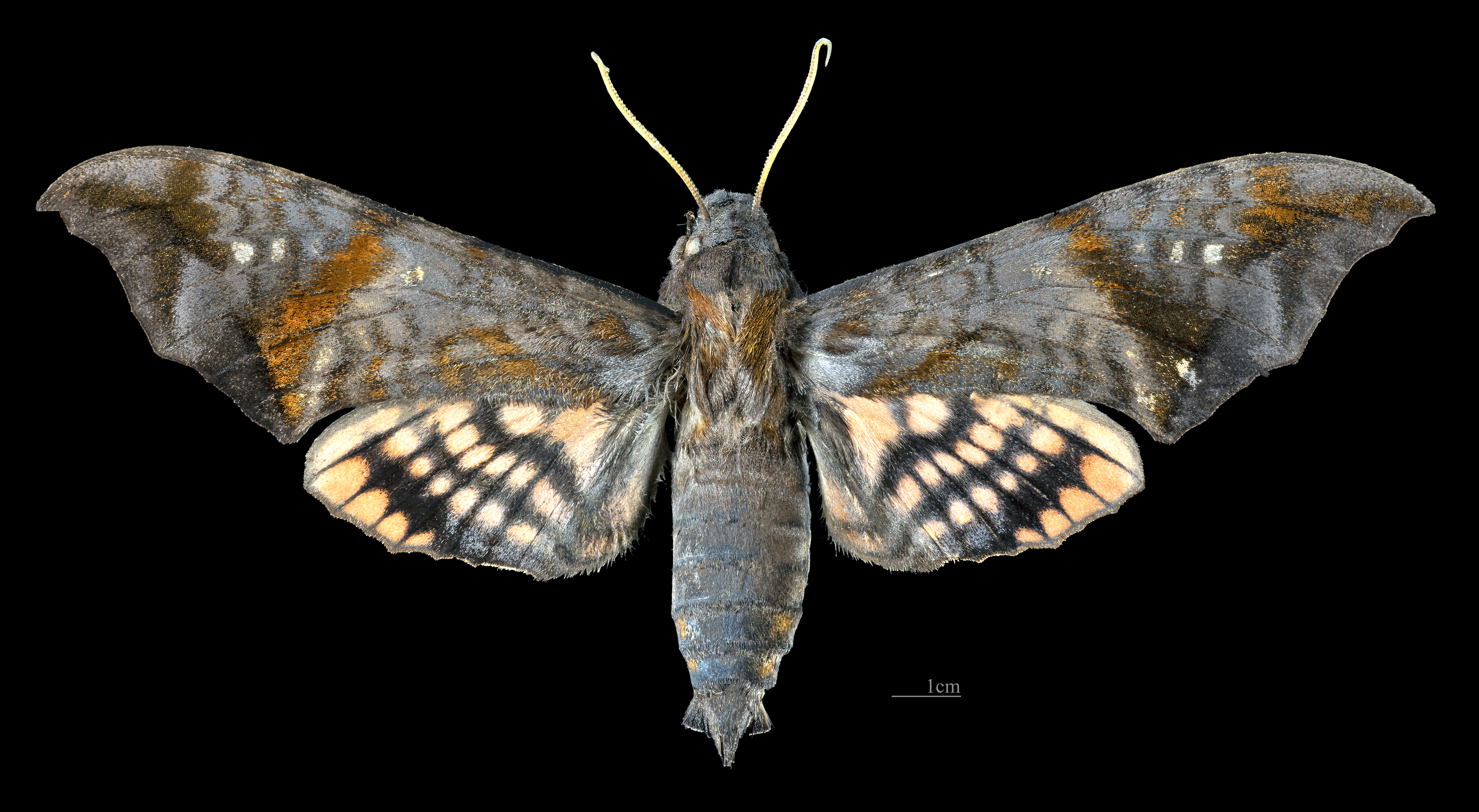
- Male dorsal
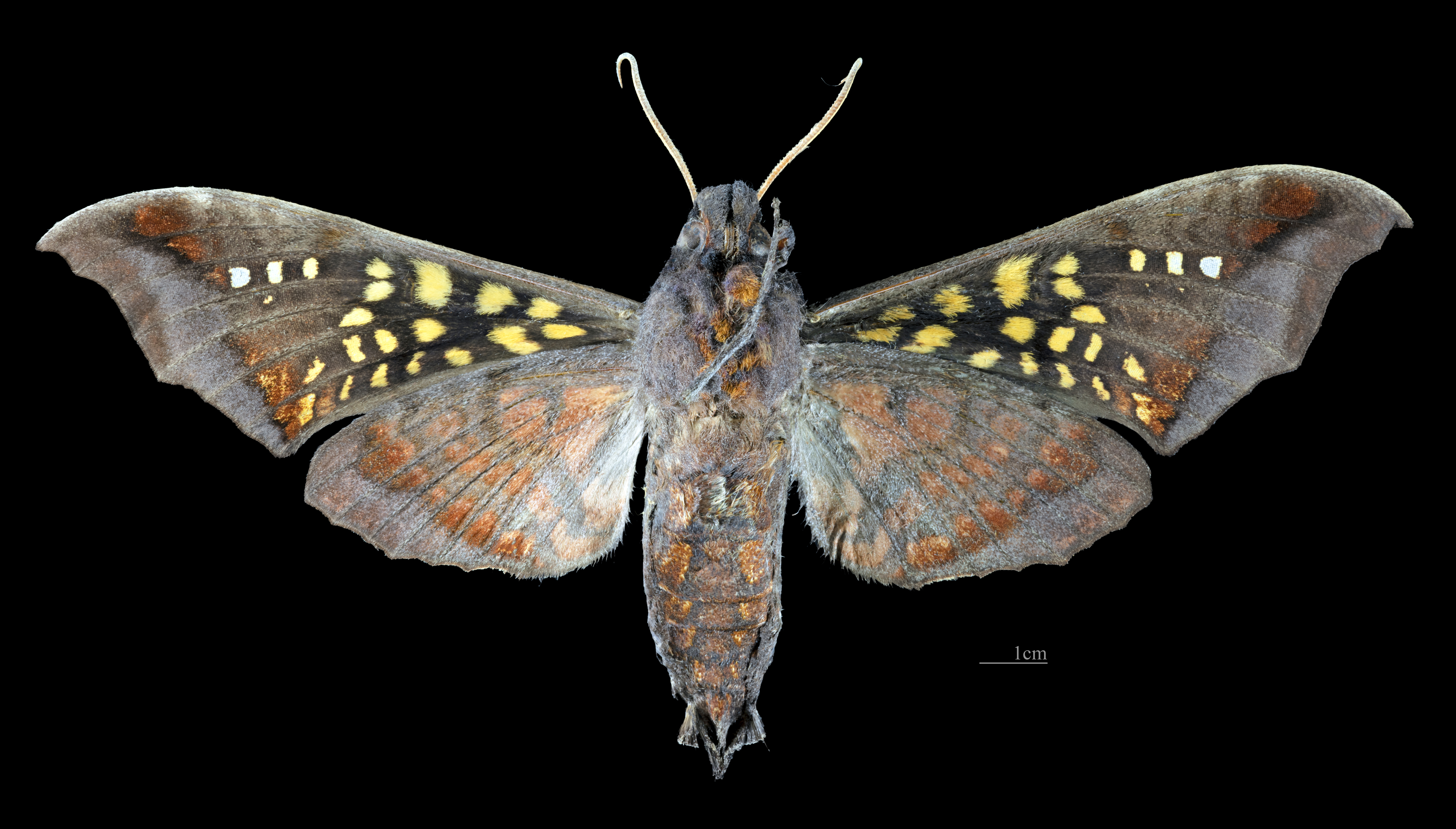
- Male ventral

Scientific classification
- Domain: Eukaryota
- Kingdom: Animalia
- Phylum: Arthropoda
- Class: Insecta
- Order: Lepidoptera
- Family: Sphingidae
- Genus: Nyceryx
- Species: N. hyposticta

Binomial name
- Nyceryx hyposticta (R Felder, 1874)

Synonyms
- Ambulyx hyposticta R. Felder, 1874; Nyceryx vega Boisduval, 1875

= Nyceryx hyposticta =

Species of moth

Nyceryx hyposticta is a moth of the family Sphingidae. It is known from Colombia, Venezuela, Ecuador, Peru and Bolivia.

It is the largest species in the genus Nyceryx and can be distinguished by the semitransparent spots in the distal half of the forewing and the pink hindwing upperside with three transverse black bands. There are numerous conspicuous yellow spots on the basal half of the forewing underside. The hindwing upperside ground colour is pink, with three transverse black bands.

Adults are on wing year round and have been reported from February to May in Bolivia, in November in Peru and in October in Ecuador.
