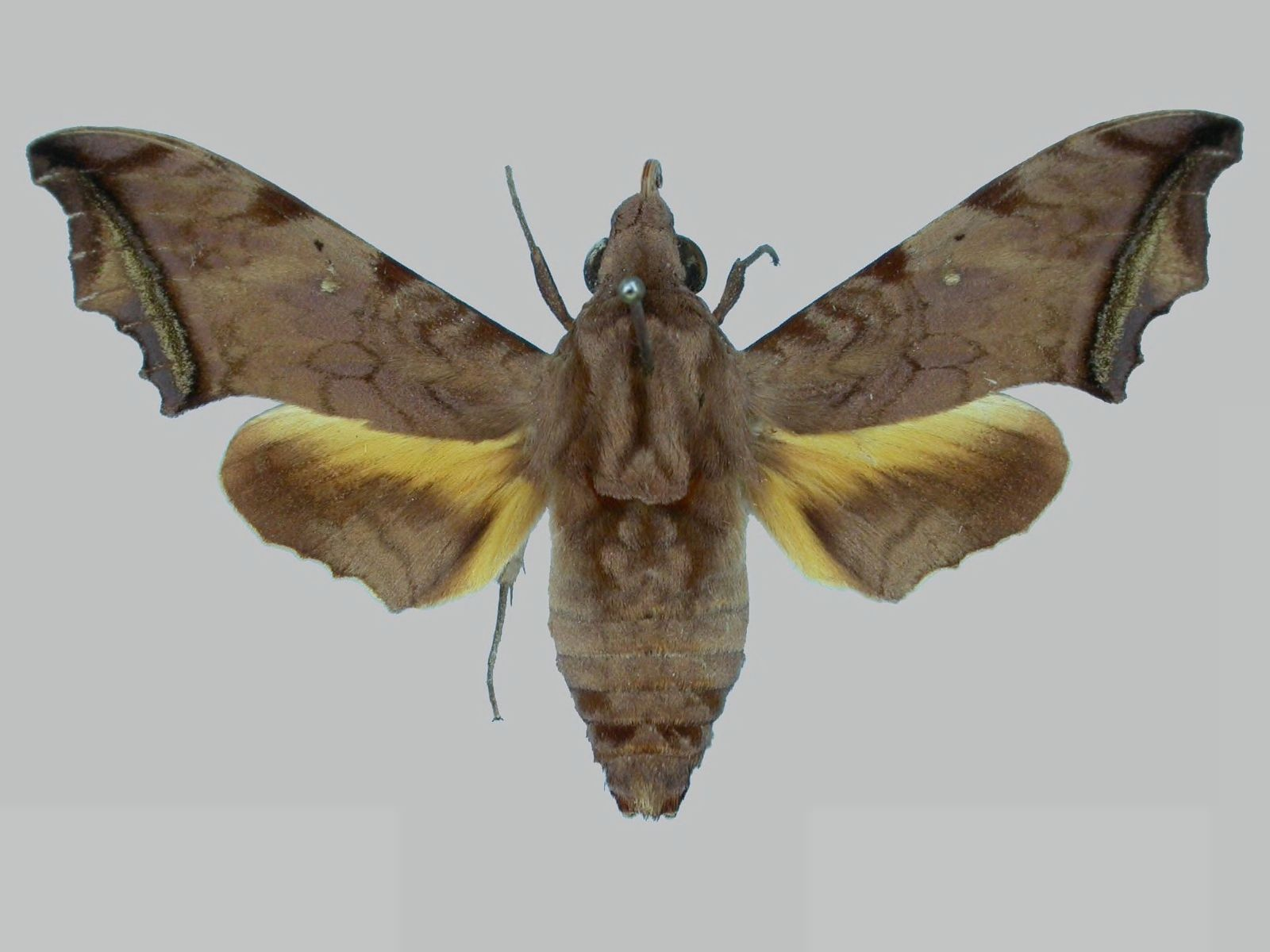

Scientific classification
- Domain: Eukaryota
- Kingdom: Animalia
- Phylum: Arthropoda
- Class: Insecta
- Order: Lepidoptera
- Family: Sphingidae
- Genus: Nyceryx
- Species: N. janzeni

Binomial name
- Nyceryx janzeni Haxaire, 2005

= Nyceryx janzeni =

Species of moth

Nyceryx janzeni is a moth belonging to the family Sphingidae. It is found in Bolivia and Brazil.
