= Nyceryx fernandezi =

Scientific classification
- Kingdom: Animalia
- Phylum: Arthropoda
- Clade: Pancrustacea
- Class: Insecta
- Order: Lepidoptera
- Family: Sphingidae
- Genus: Nyceryx
- Species: N. fernandezi

Binomial name
- Nyceryx fernandezi Haxaire & Cadiou, 1999

Species of moth

Nyceryx fernandezi is a moth of the family Sphingidae. It is known from Venezuela.
