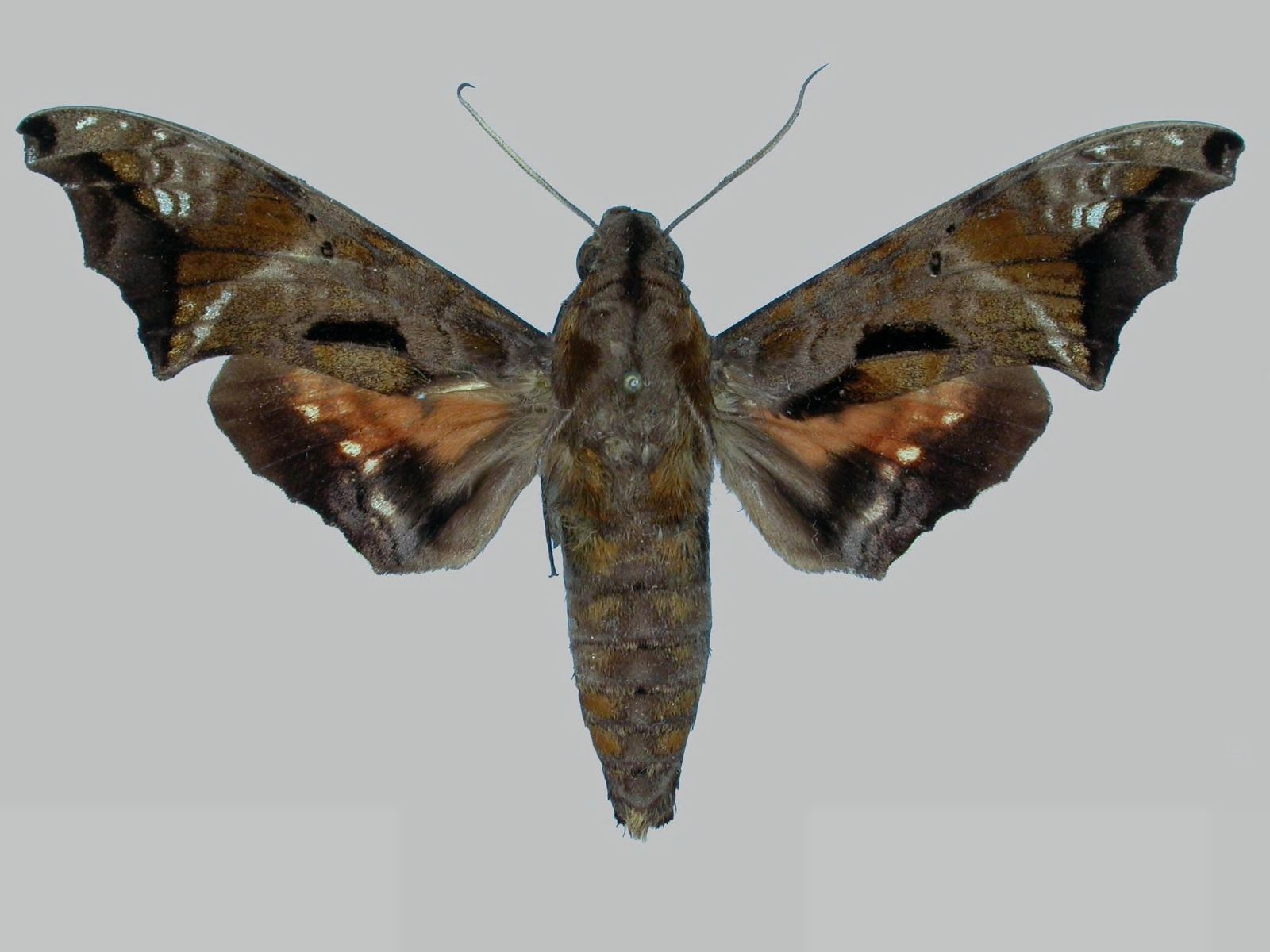

Scientific classification
- Domain: Eukaryota
- Kingdom: Animalia
- Phylum: Arthropoda
- Class: Insecta
- Order: Lepidoptera
- Family: Sphingidae
- Genus: Nyceryx
- Species: N. lunaris

Binomial name
- Nyceryx lunaris Jordan, 1912

= Nyceryx lunaris =

Species of moth

Nyceryx lunaris is a moth of the family Sphingidae. It is known from Ecuador.

Adults are probably on wing year round.
