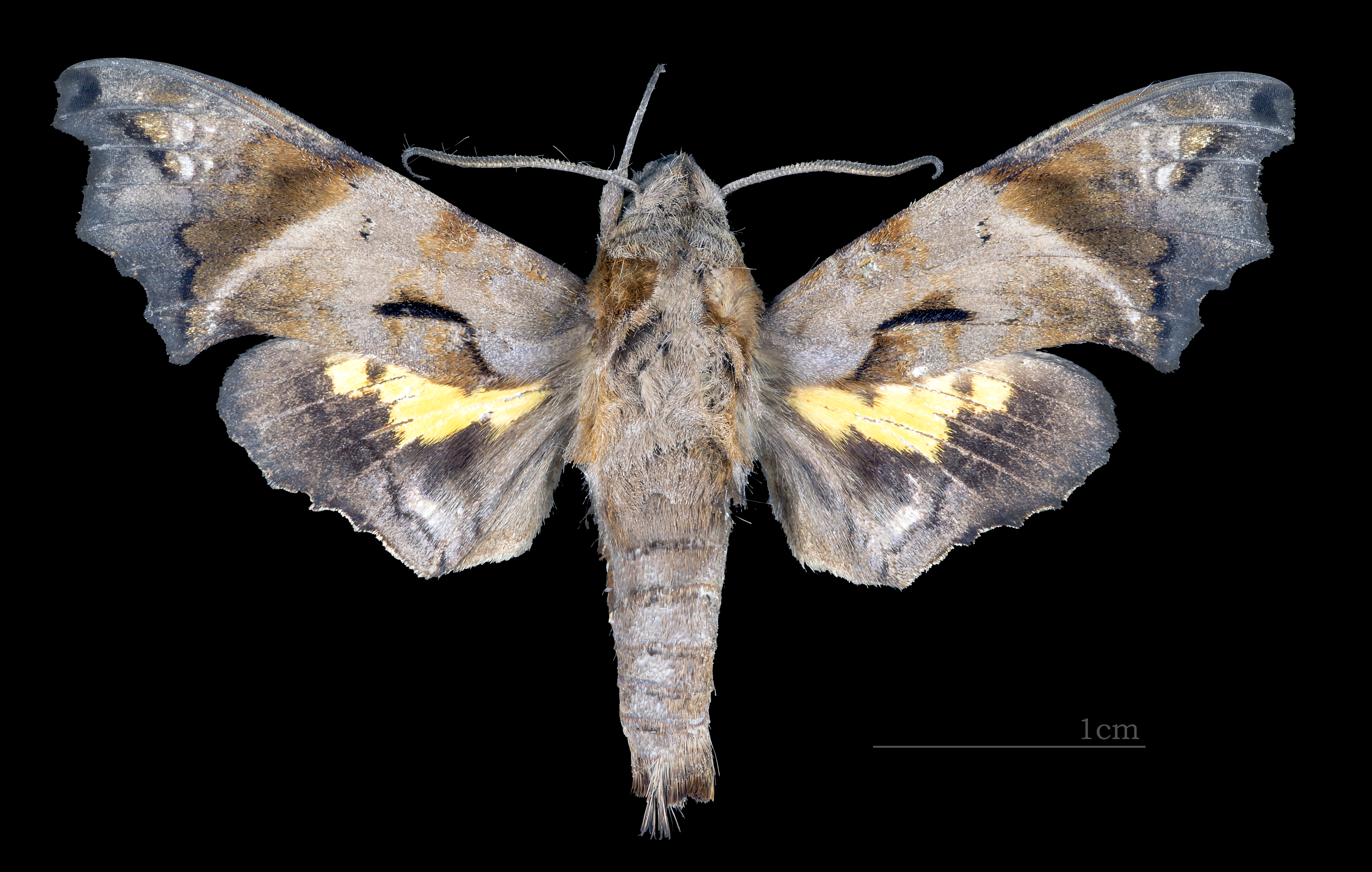
- Male dorsal view
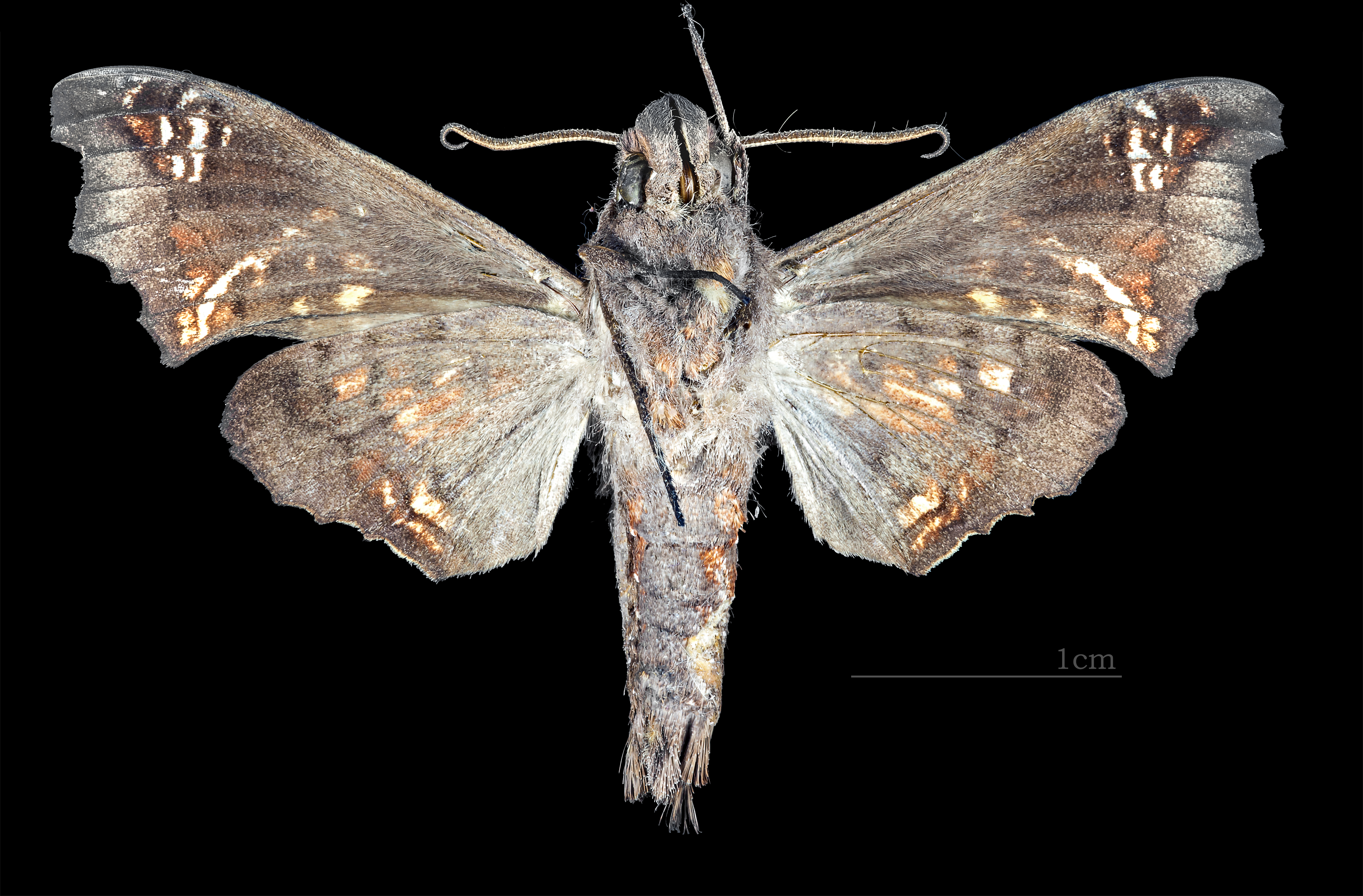
- Male ventral view

Scientific classification
- Domain: Eukaryota
- Kingdom: Animalia
- Phylum: Arthropoda
- Class: Insecta
- Order: Lepidoptera
- Family: Sphingidae
- Genus: Nyceryx
- Species: N. ericea

Binomial name
- Nyceryx ericea (H. Druce, 1888)

Synonyms
- Pachygonia ericea H. Druce, 1888; Nyceryx ericea minor Clark, 1916

= Nyceryx ericea =

Species of moth

Nyceryx ericea is a moth of the family Sphingidae first described by Herbert Druce in 1888. It is found from Panama, Guatemala and Costa Rica to Brazil and Bolivia.

It can be distinguished from all other Nyceryx species by the semitransparent spots in the distal half of the forewing and the tornal area of the hindwing, as well as the yellow base to the hindwing upperside.

Adults are probably on wing year round.
