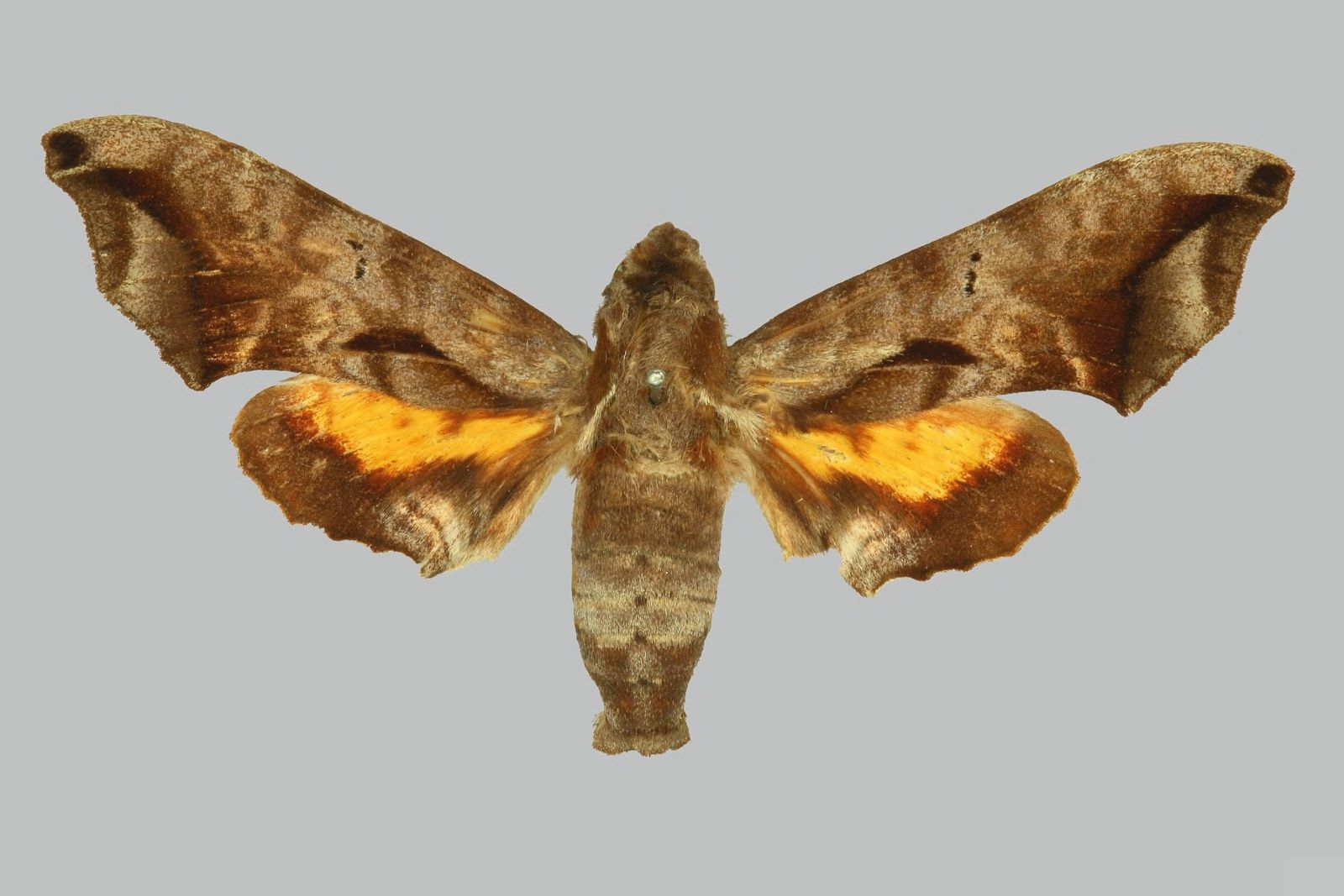

Scientific classification
- Domain: Eukaryota
- Kingdom: Animalia
- Phylum: Arthropoda
- Class: Insecta
- Order: Lepidoptera
- Family: Sphingidae
- Genus: Nyceryx
- Species: N. maxwelli

Binomial name
- Nyceryx maxwelli (Rothschild, 1896)

Synonyms
- Pachygonia maxwelli Rothschild, 1896

= Nyceryx maxwelli =

Species of moth

Nyceryx maxwelli is a moth of the family Sphingidae. It is known from Bolivia and Venezuela.

The wingspan is about 63 mm. It is similar to Nyceryx continua cratera but the apex of the hindwing upperside is brown and the tornal area is not yellow. The basal area of the hindwing upperside is yellow, while the apex is brownish-orange.

Adults are on wing year round.
