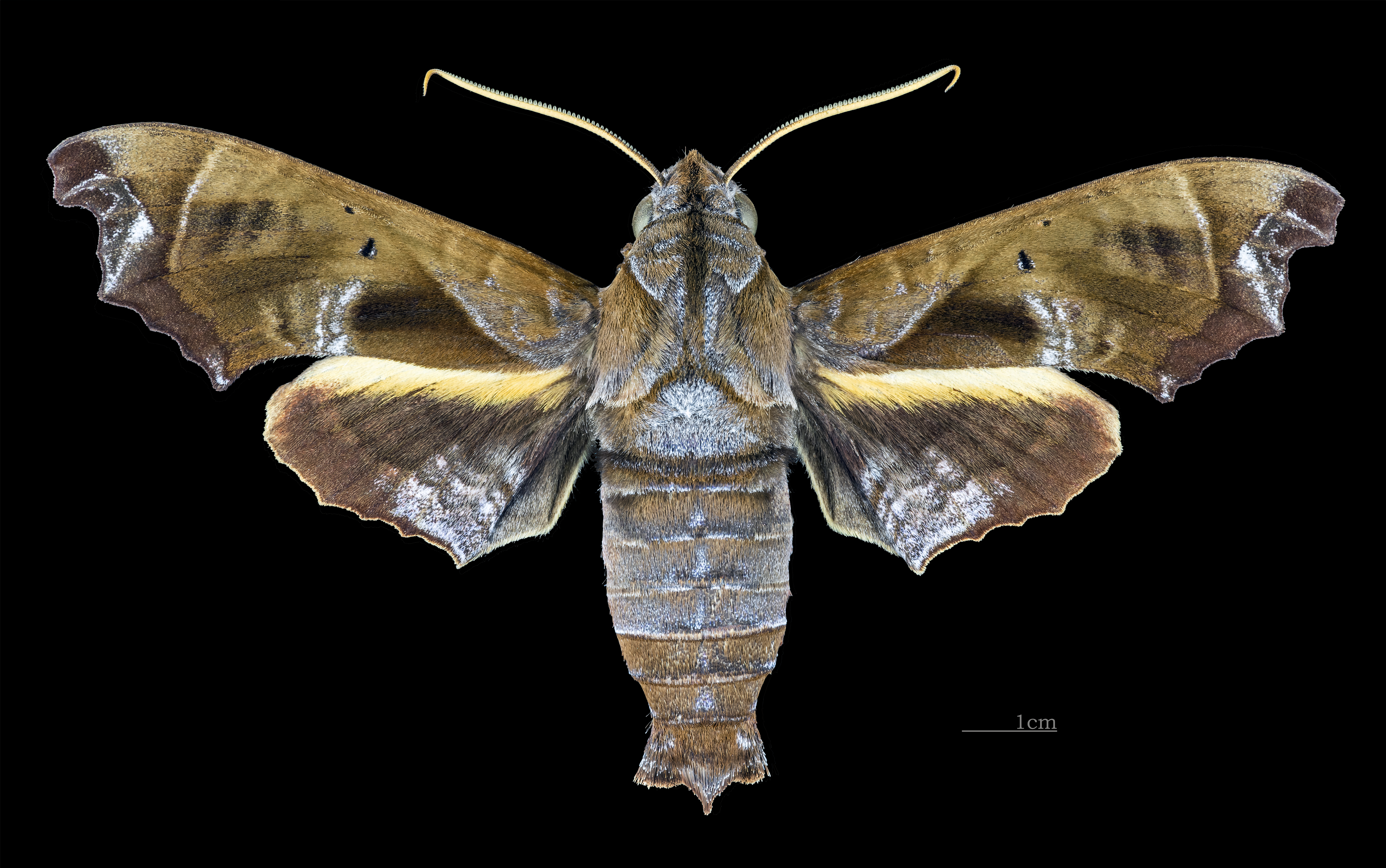
- Male dorsal view
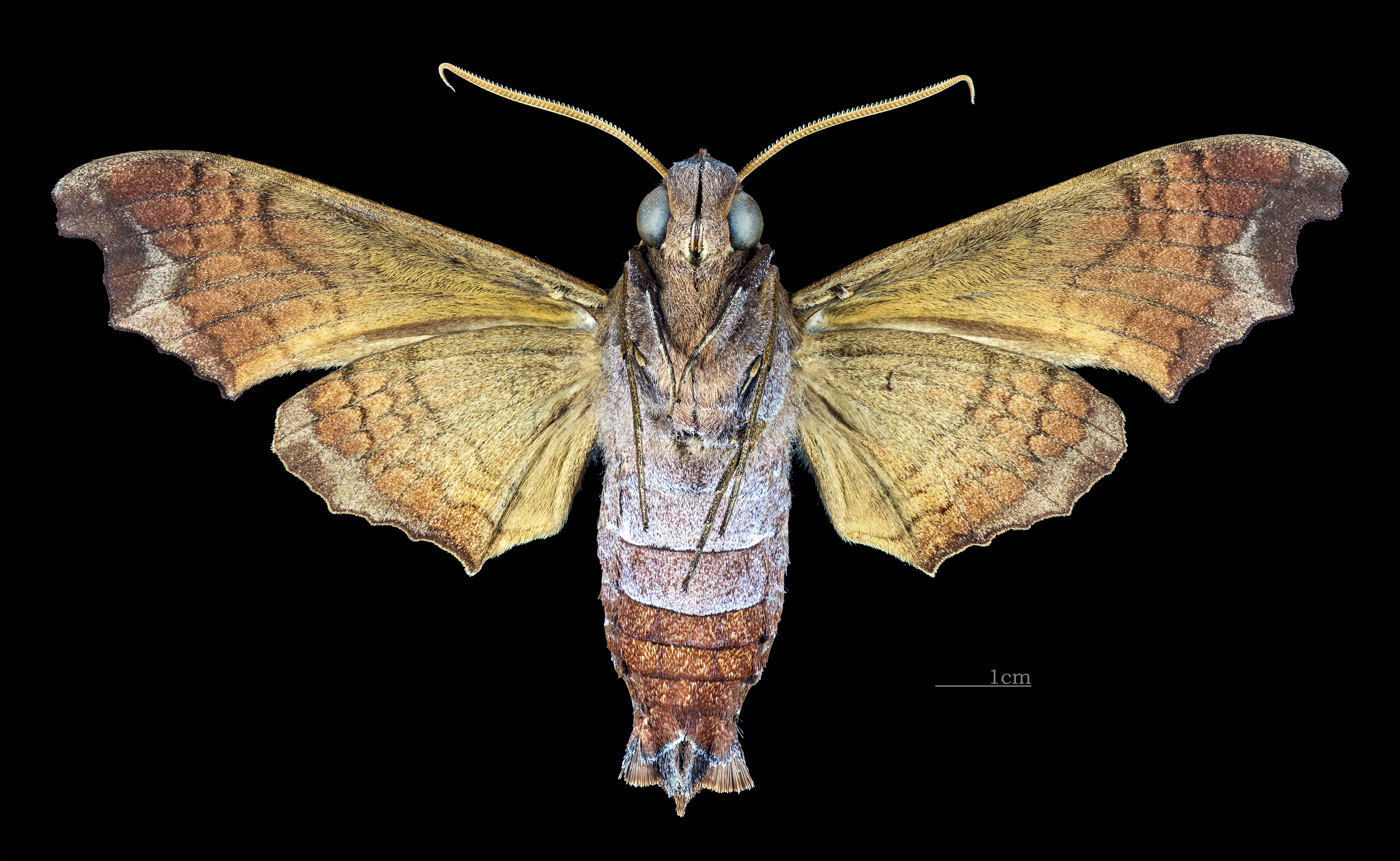
- Male ventral view

Scientific classification
- Domain: Eukaryota
- Kingdom: Animalia
- Phylum: Arthropoda
- Class: Insecta
- Order: Lepidoptera
- Family: Sphingidae
- Genus: Nyceryx
- Species: N. tacita

Binomial name
- Nyceryx tacita (H. Druce, 1888)

Synonyms
- Perigonia tacita H. Druce, 1888; Neceryx clarki Fassl, 1915

= Nyceryx tacita =

Species of moth

Nyceryx tacita is a moth of the family Sphingidae first described by Herbert Druce in 1888. It is found from Mexico, Guatemala, Costa Rica and Panama to Bolivia.

It is similar to Nyceryx eximia eximia but can be distinguished by the less extensive basal yellow area of the hindwing upperside and details of the pattern of the forewing upperside.

Adults are probably on wing year round.

The larvae have been recorded feeding on Pentagonia donnell-smithii and Chimarrhis parviflora. Late instar larvae take on more colouration and the head region becomes quite distinctive. The pupa is smooth and shiny with some creases around the thorax.
