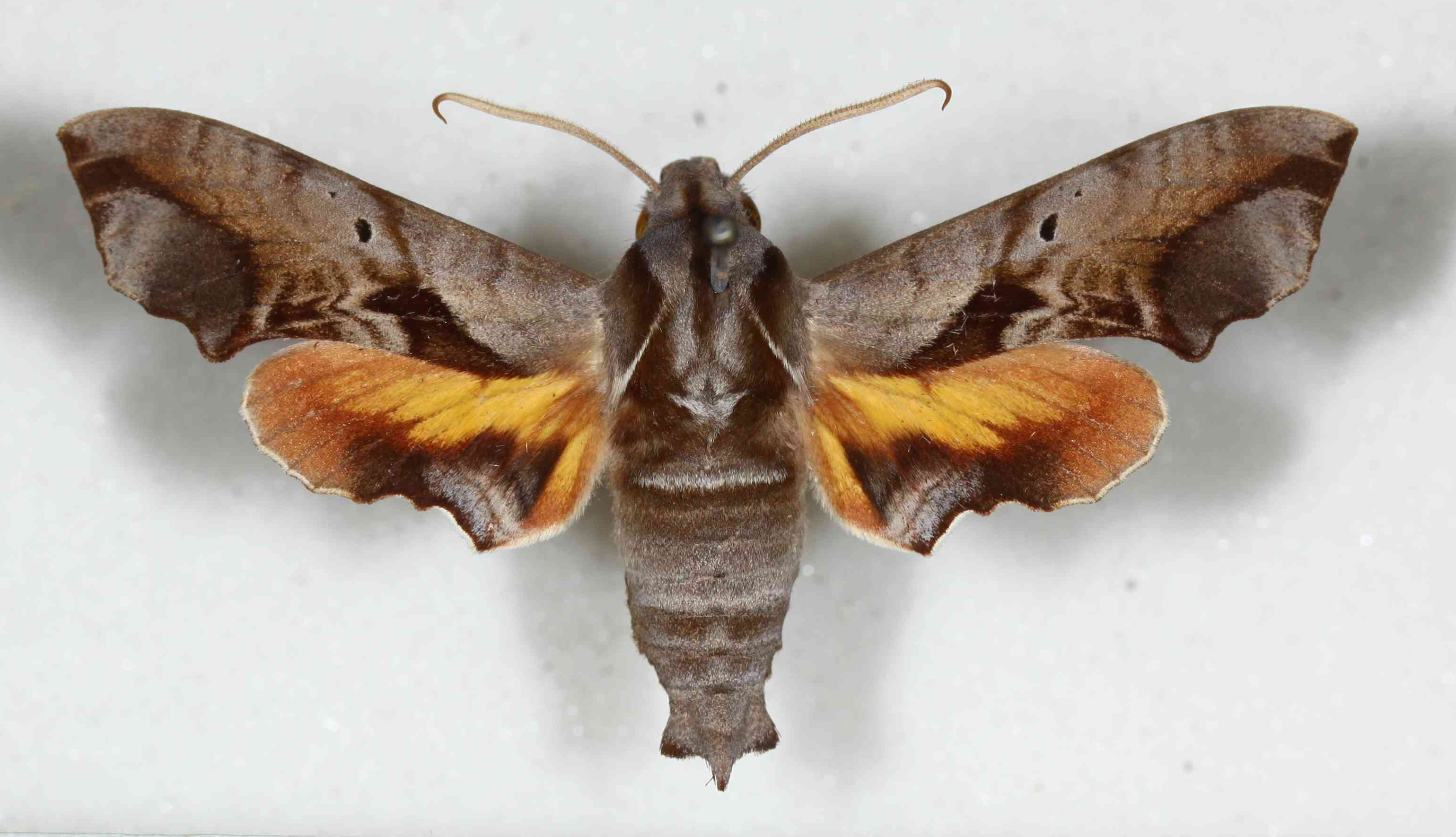

Scientific classification
- Kingdom: Animalia
- Phylum: Arthropoda
- Clade: Pancrustacea
- Class: Insecta
- Order: Lepidoptera
- Family: Sphingidae
- Genus: Nyceryx
- Species: N. brevis

Binomial name
- Nyceryx brevis Becker, 2001

= Nyceryx brevis =

Species of moth

Nyceryx brevis is a moth of the family Sphingidae. It is known from Brazil.

The length of the forewings is 20–22 mm. It is the smallest Nyceryx species.
