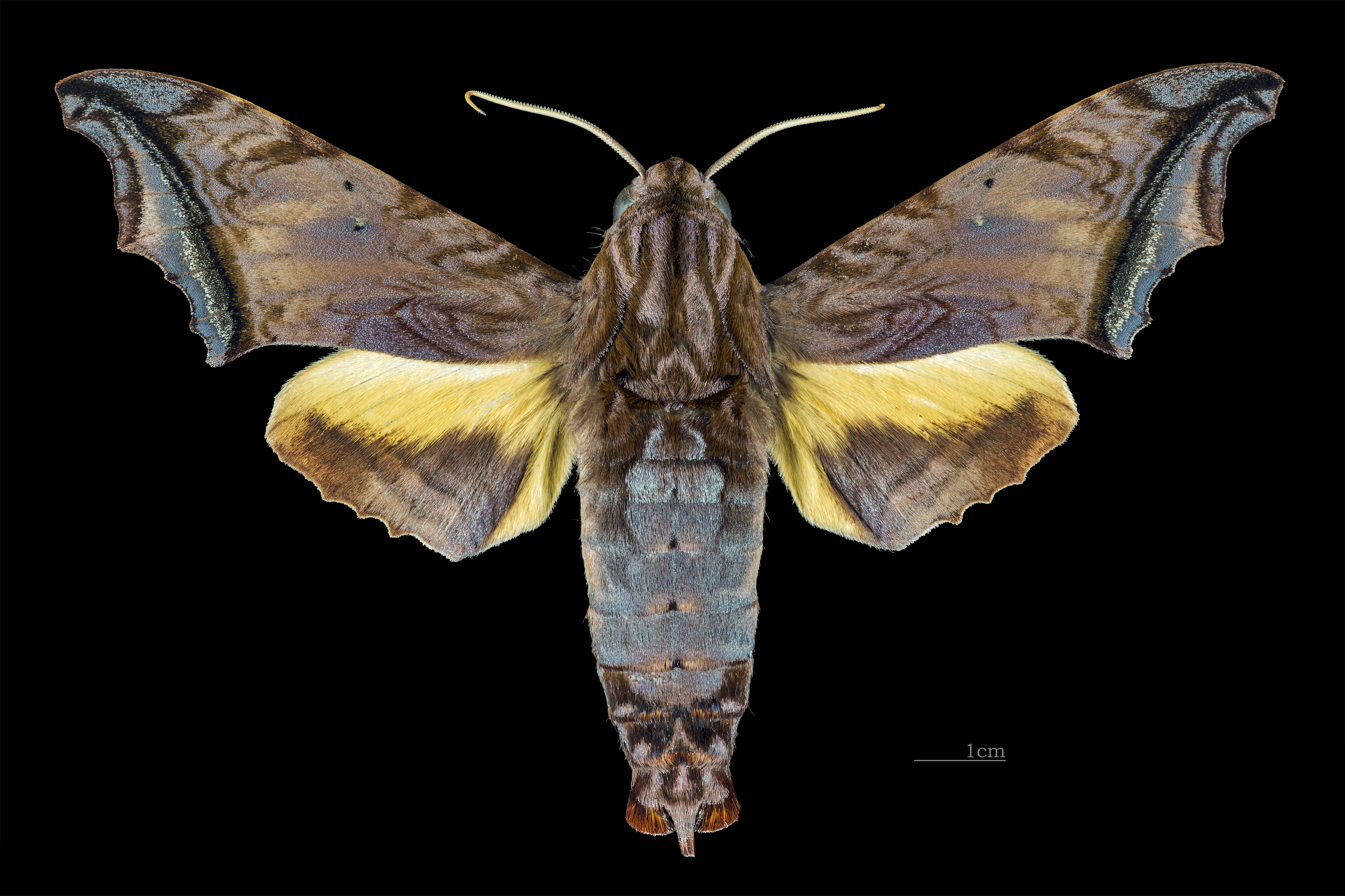
- Nyceryx stuarti

Scientific classification
- Kingdom: Animalia
- Phylum: Arthropoda
- Clade: Pancrustacea
- Class: Insecta
- Order: Lepidoptera
- Family: Sphingidae
- Subtribe: Dilophonotina
- Genus: Nyceryx; Boisduval, [1875]

= Nyceryx =

Genus of moths

Nyceryx is a genus of moths in the family Sphingidae. The genus was erected by Jean Baptiste Boisduval in 1875.

== Species ==
- Nyceryx alophus (Boisduval, 1875)
- Nyceryx brevis Becker, 2001
- Nyceryx coffaeae (Walker, 1856)
- Nyceryx continua (Walker, 1856)
- Nyceryx draudti Gehlen, 1926
- Nyceryx ericea (H. Druce, 1888)
- Nyceryx eximia Rothschild & Jordan, 1916
- Nyceryx fernandezi Haxaire & Cadiou, 1999
- Nyceryx furtadoi Haxaire, 1996
- Nyceryx hyposticta (R. Felder, 1874)
- Nyceryx janzeni Haxaire, 2005
- Nyceryx lunaris Jordan, 1912
- Nyceryx magna (R. Felder, 1874)
- Nyceryx maxwelli (Rothschild, 1896)
- Nyceryx mielkei Haxaire, 2009
- Nyceryx nephus (Boisduval, 1875)
- Nyceryx nictitans (Boisduval, 1875)
- Nyceryx riscus (Schaus, 1890)
- Nyceryx stuarti (Rothschild, 1894)
- Nyceryx tacita (H. Druce, 1888)
- Nephele vau (Walker, 1856)
- Nephele xylina Rothschild & Jordan, 1910

== Gallery ==
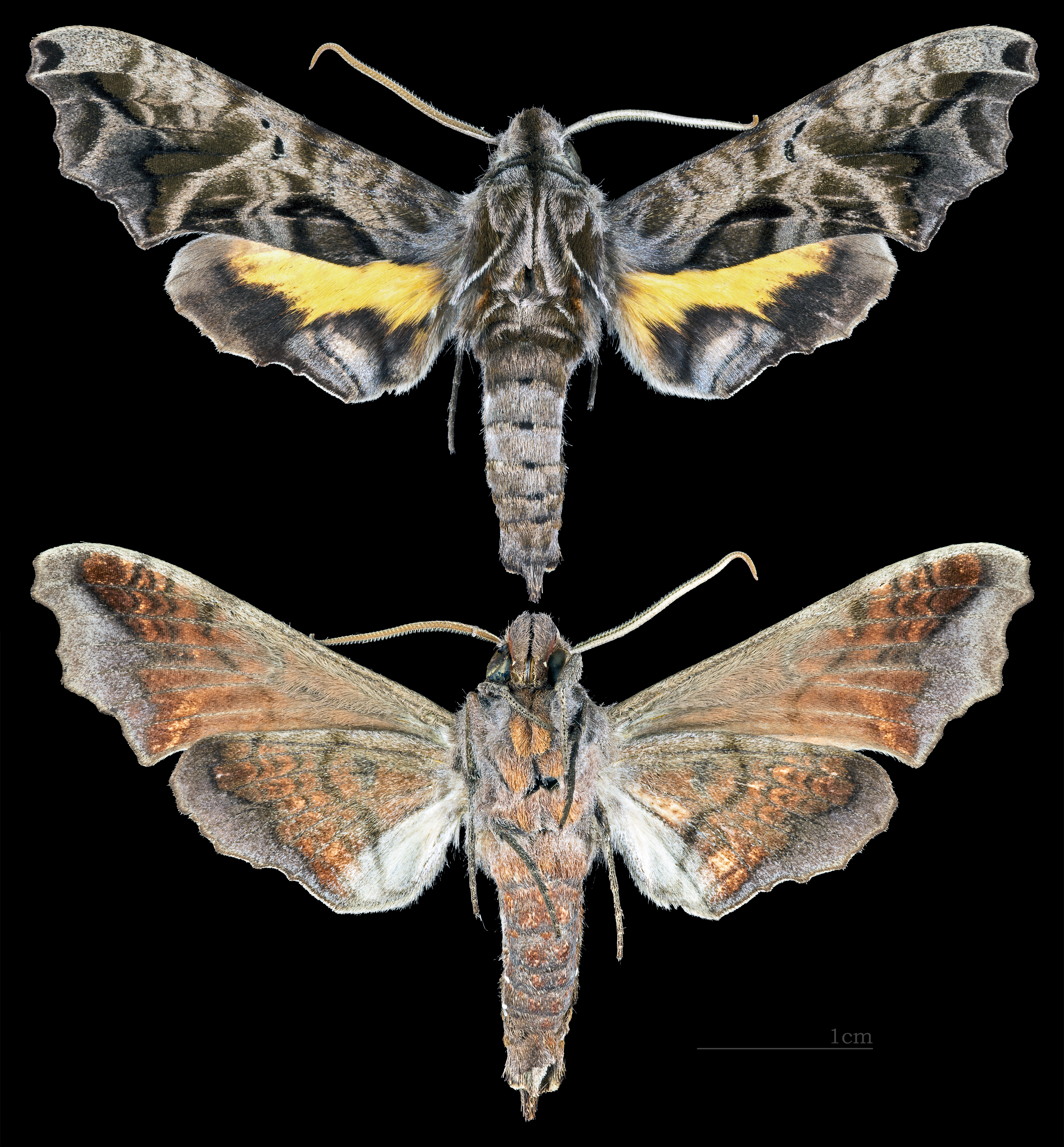
Nyceryx alophus

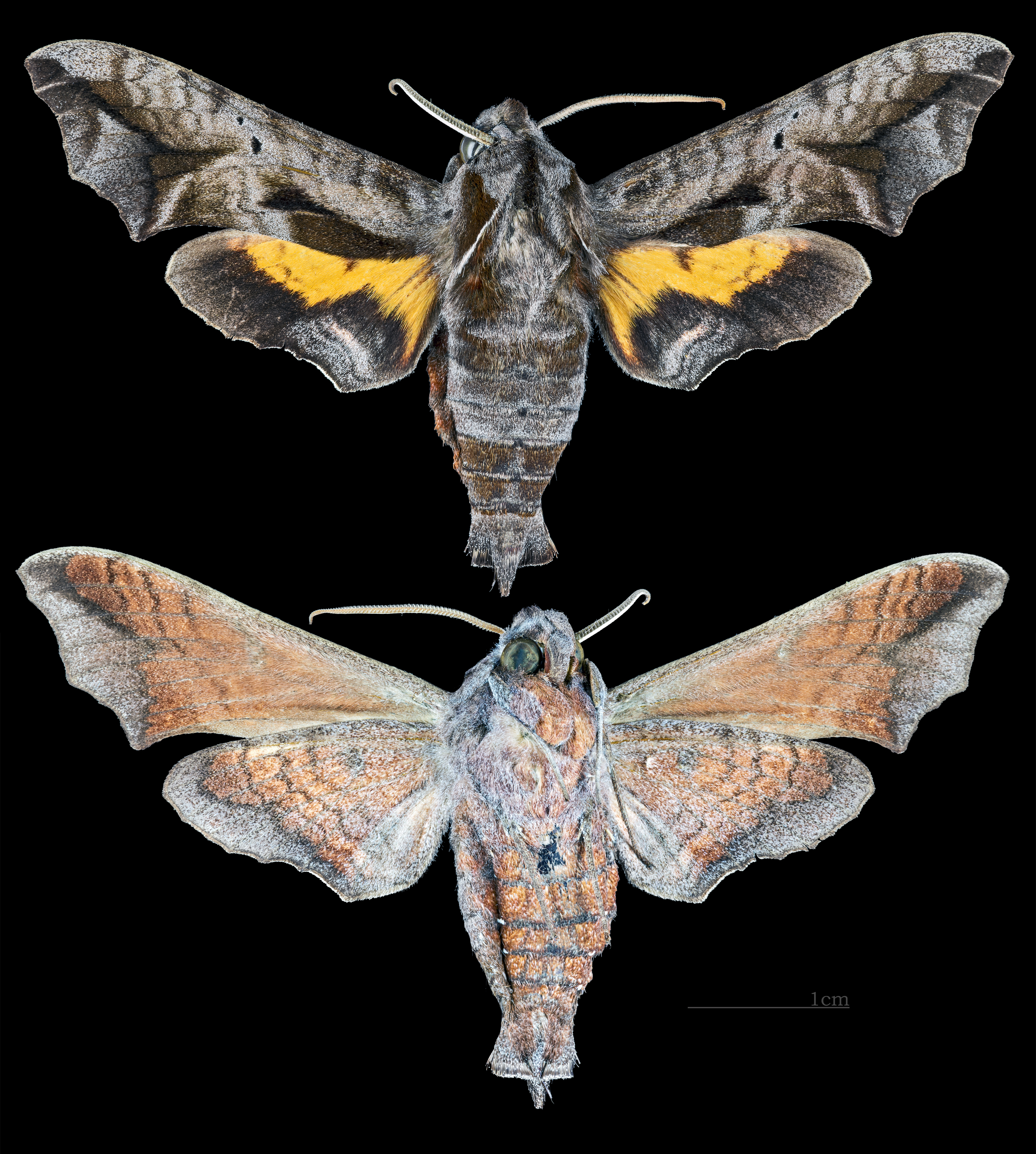
Nyceryx continua

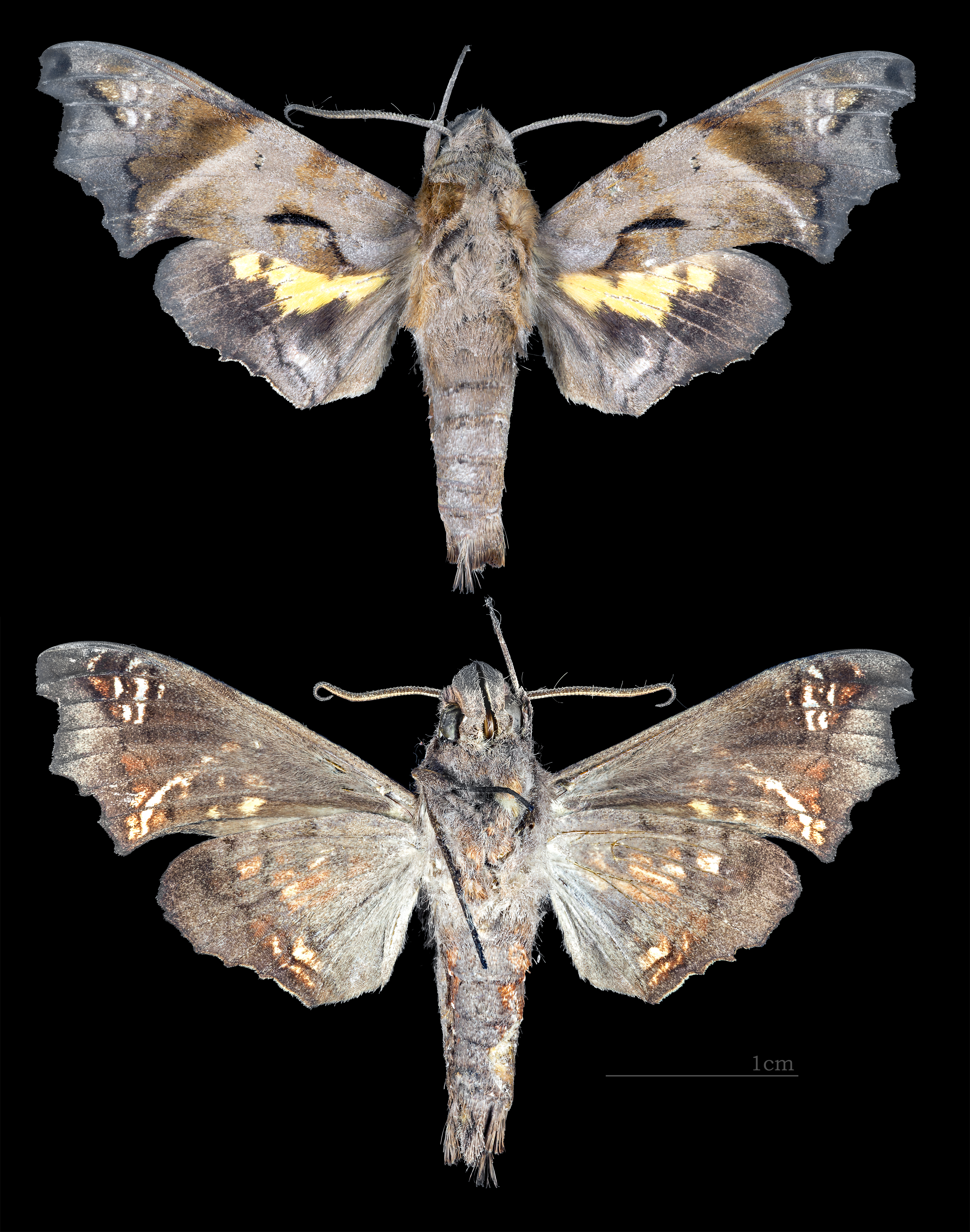
Nyceryx ericea

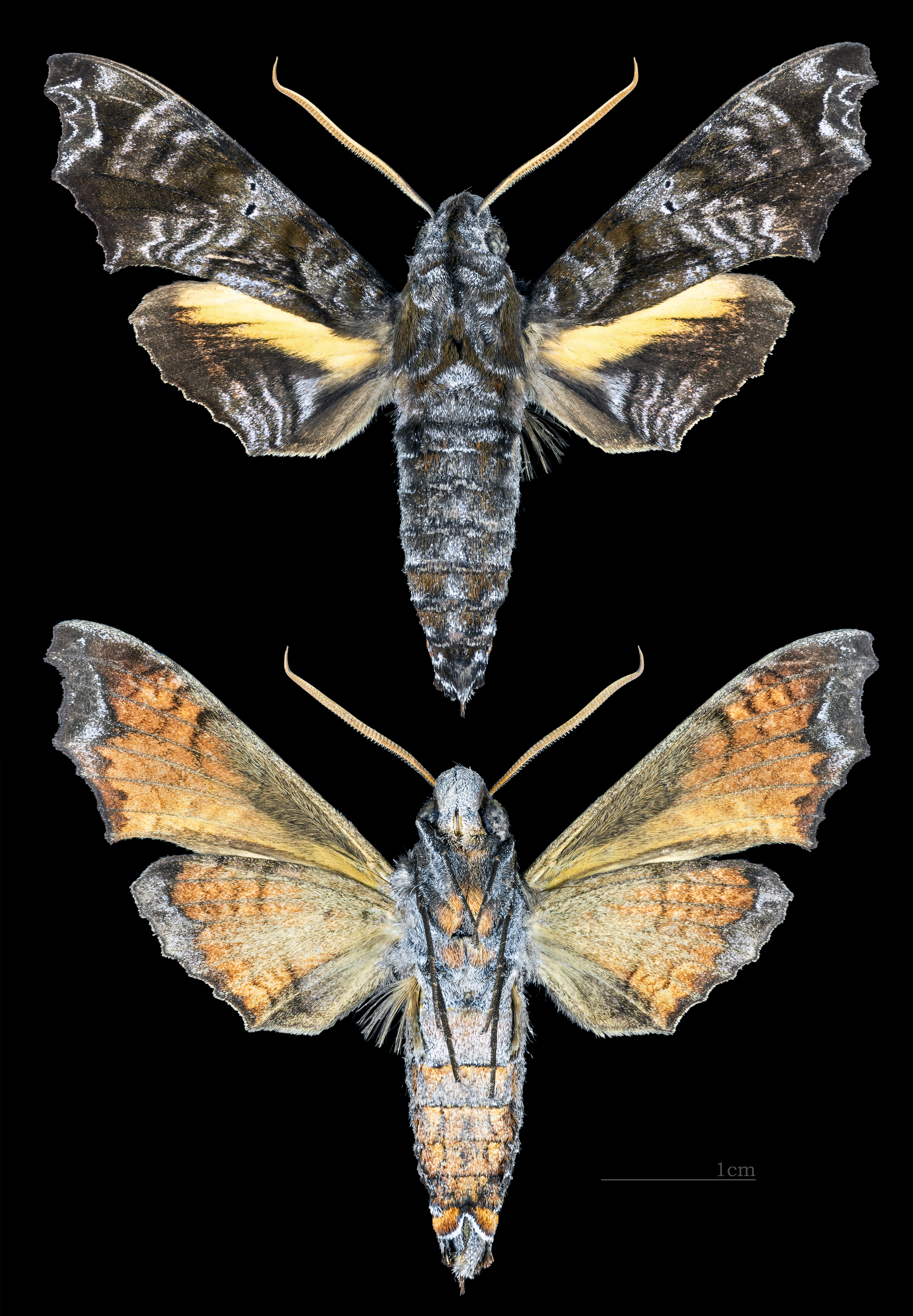
Nyceryx eximia

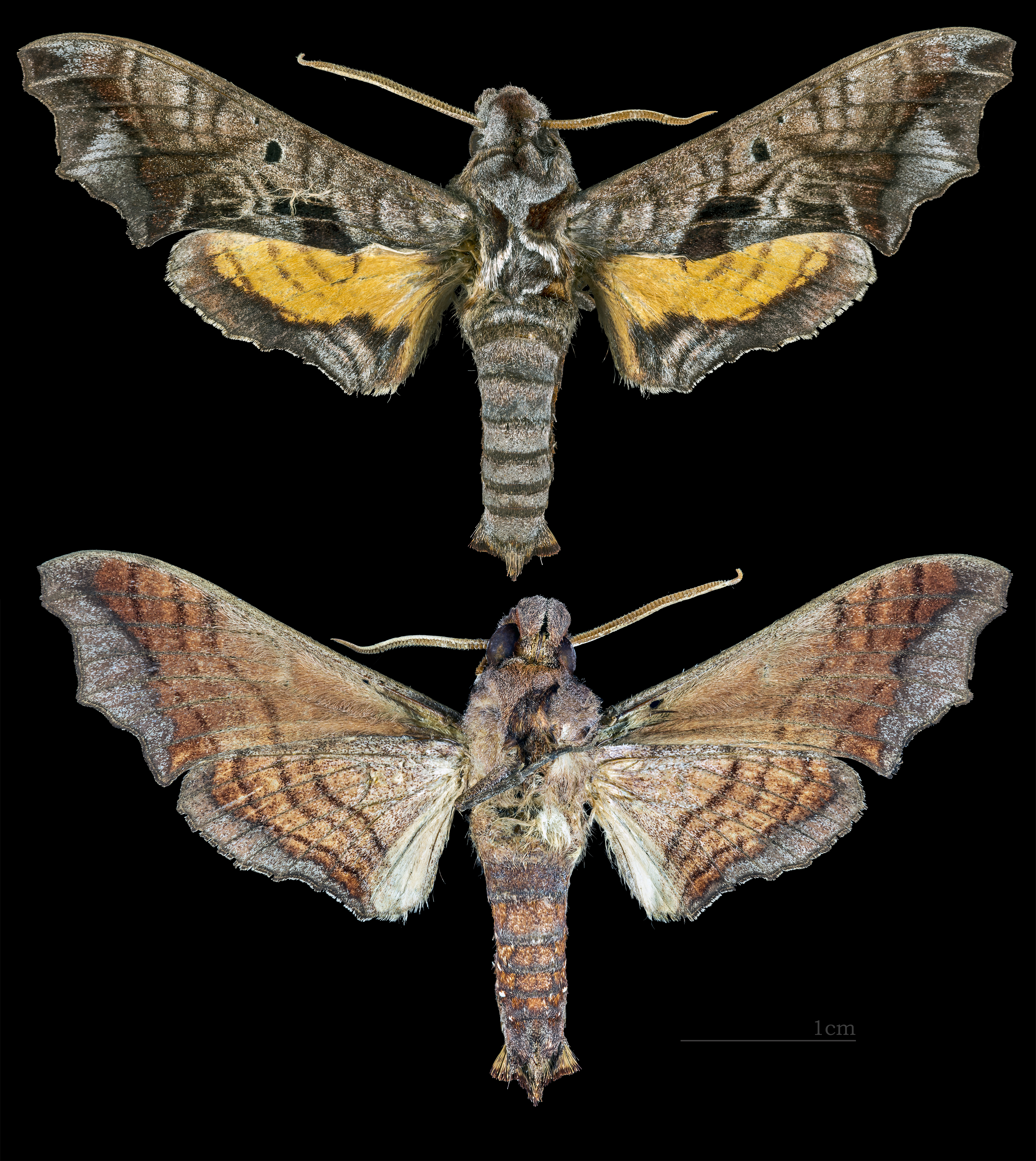
Nyceryx furtadoi

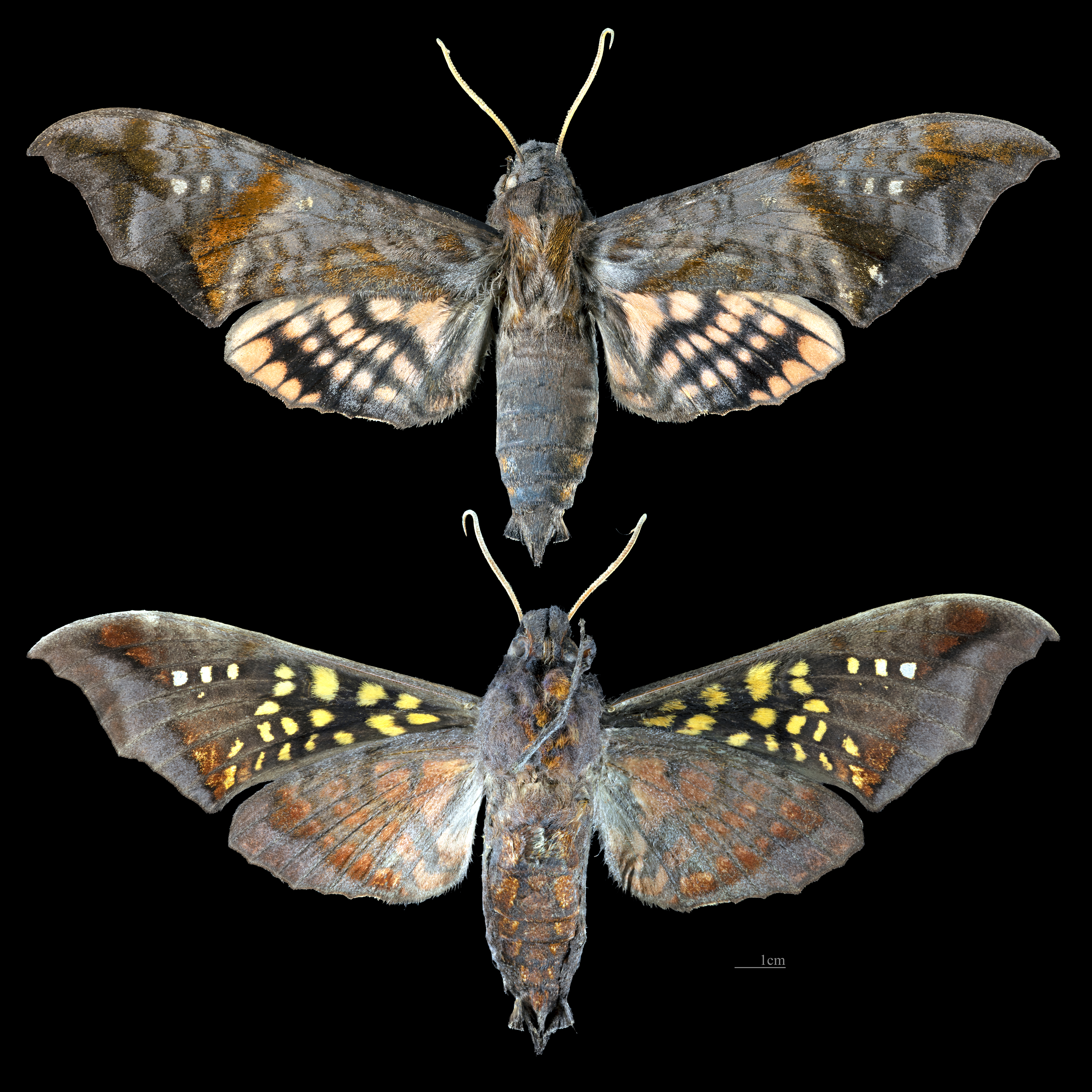
Nyceryx hyposticta

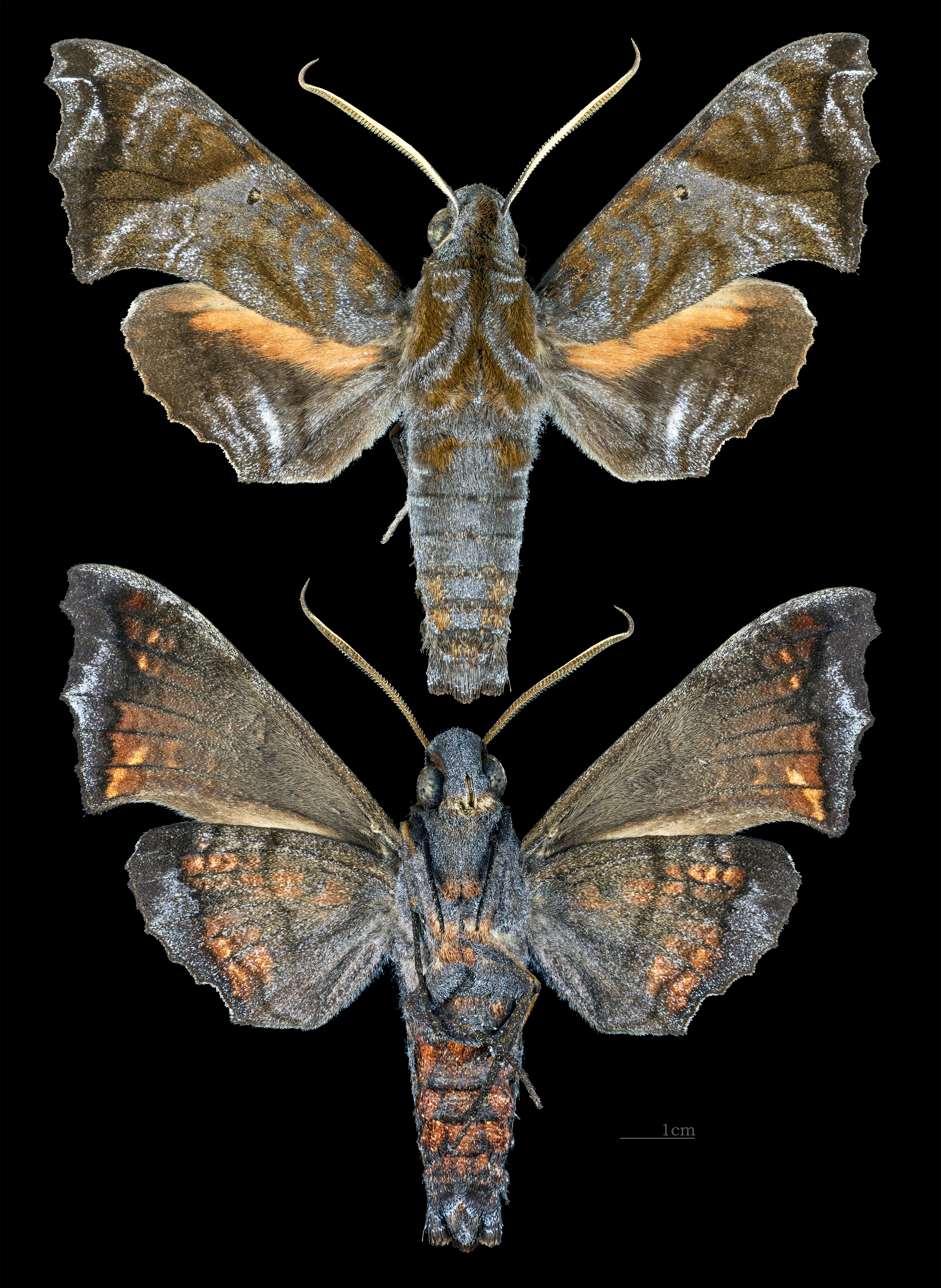
Nyceryx magna

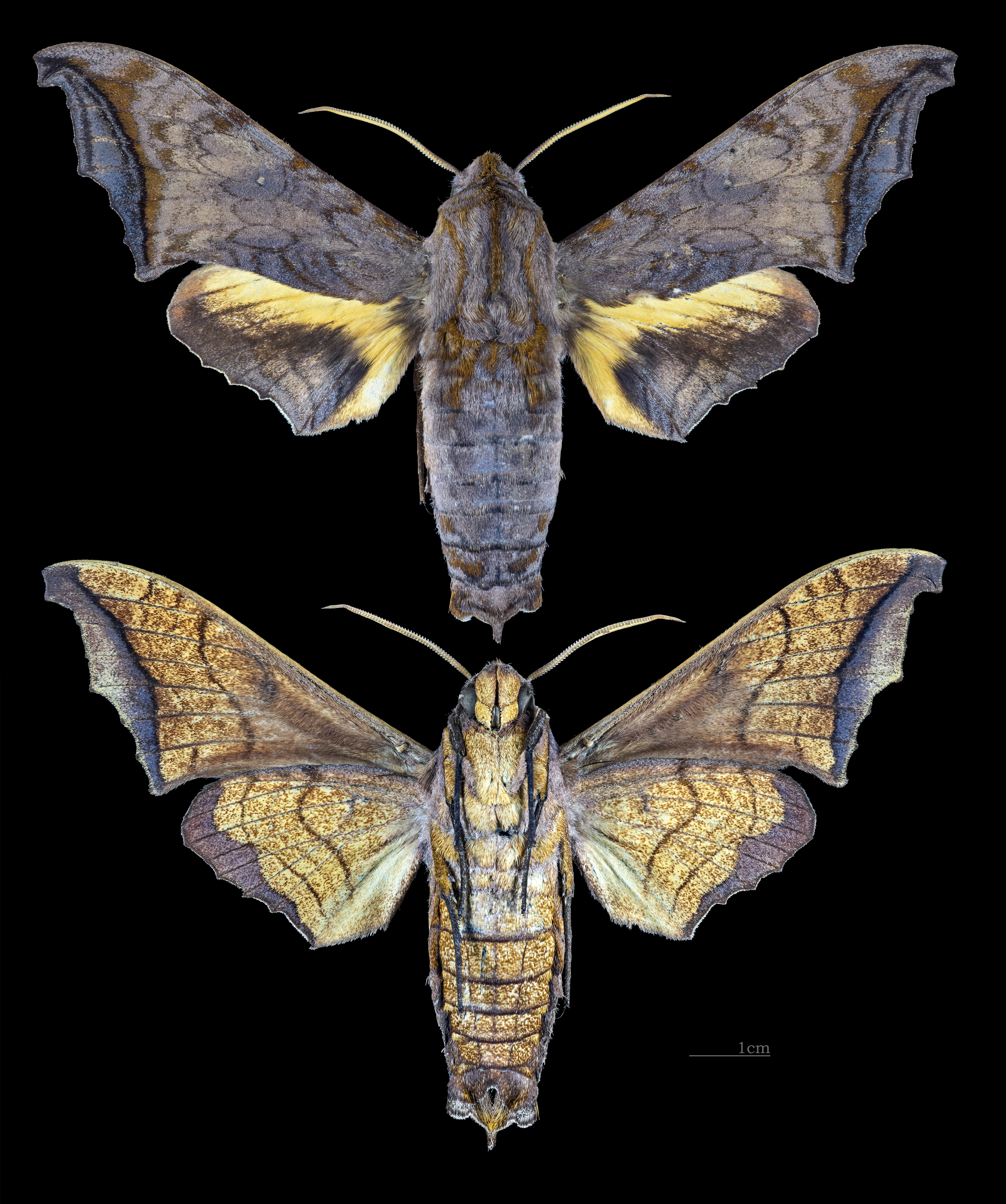
Nyceryx riscus

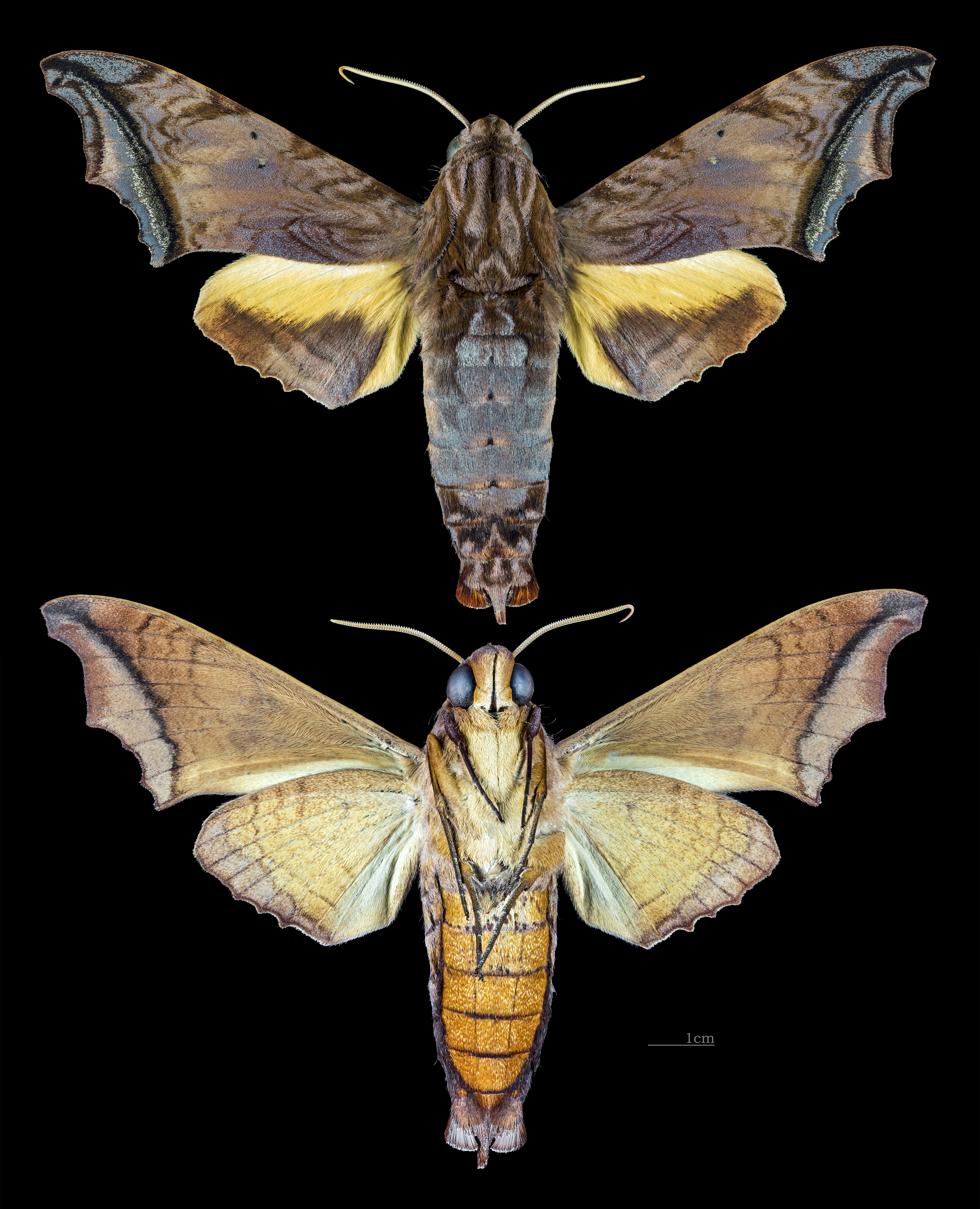
Nyceryx stuarti

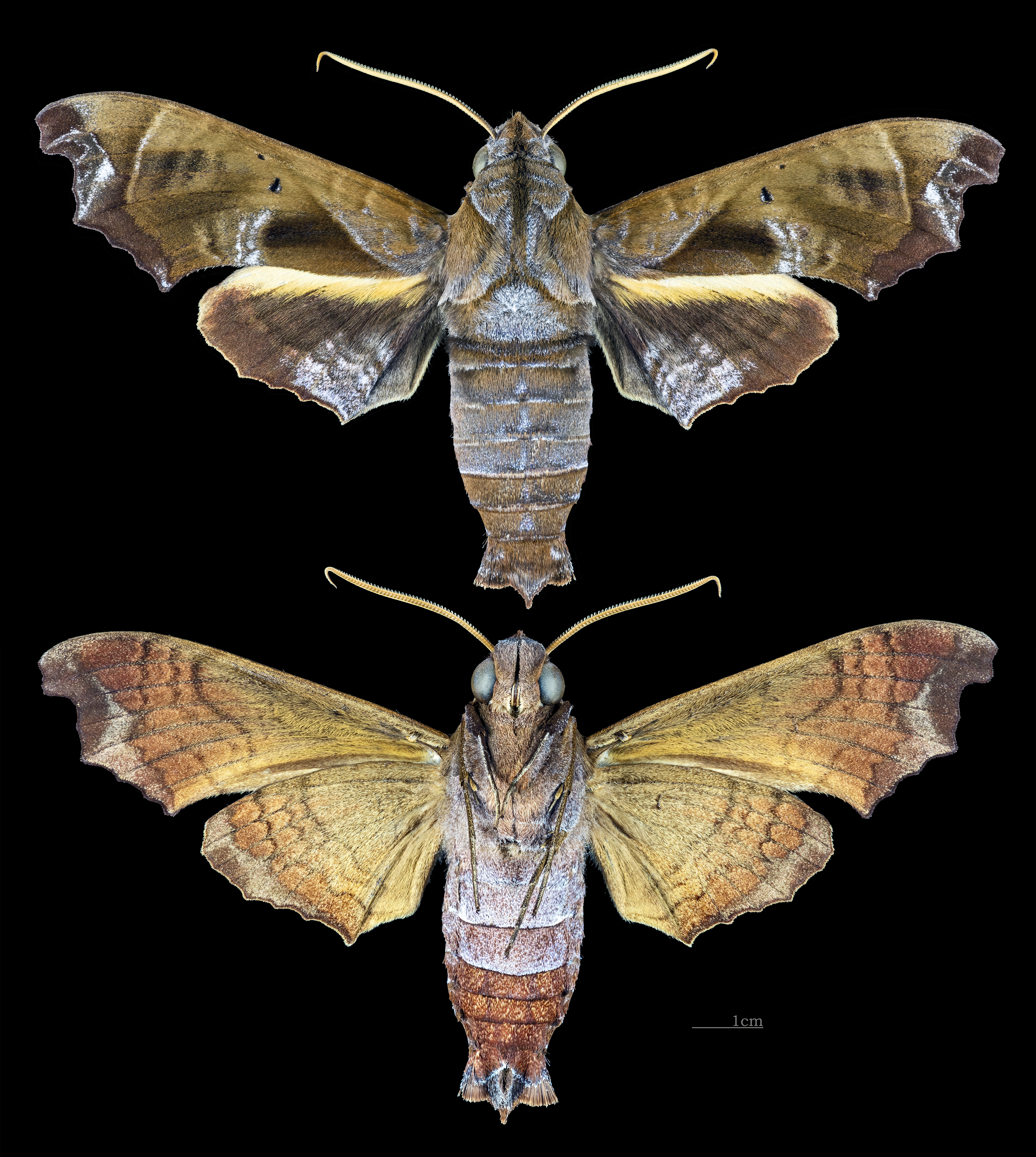
Nyceryx tacita
