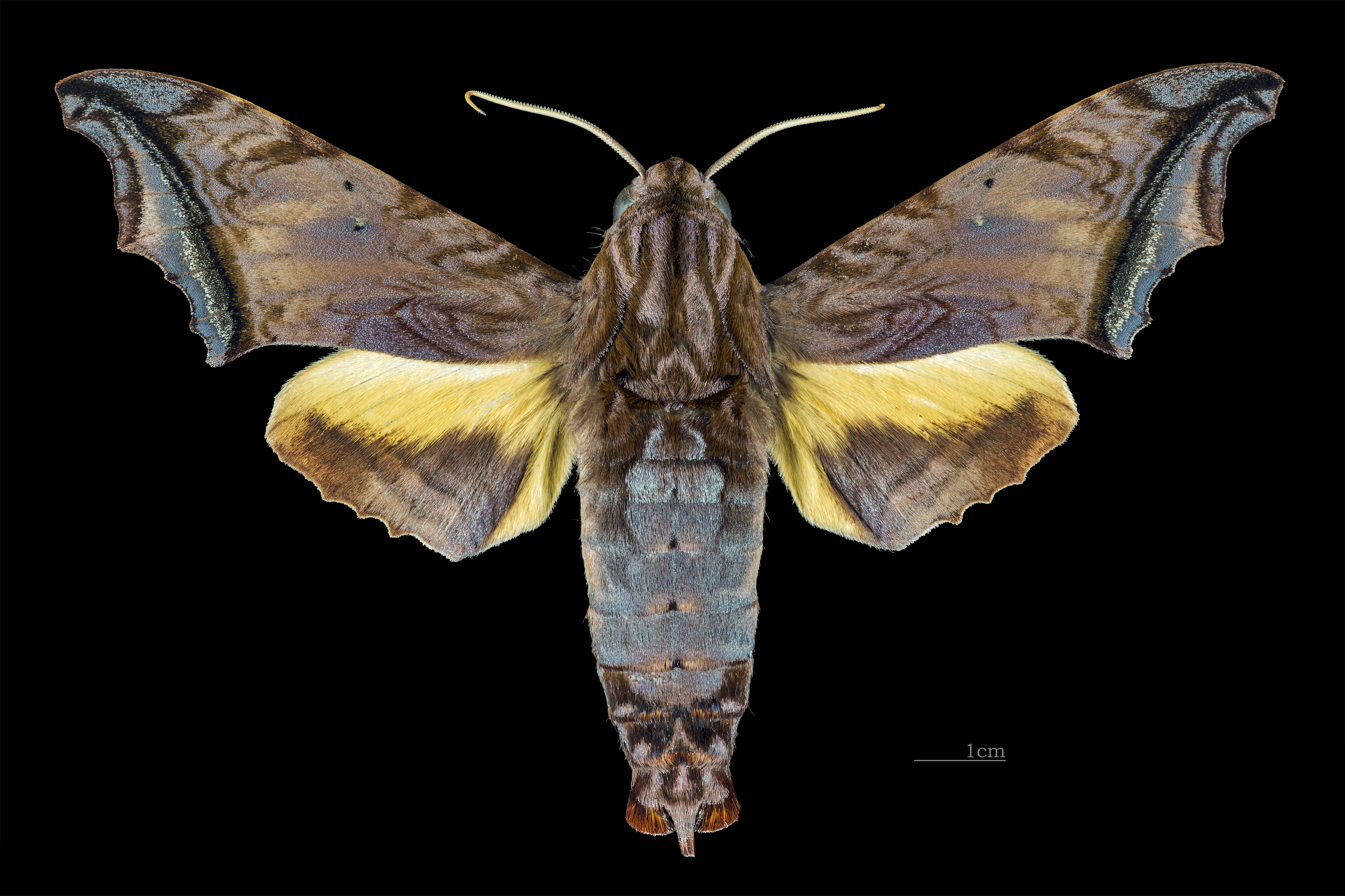
- Male dorsal
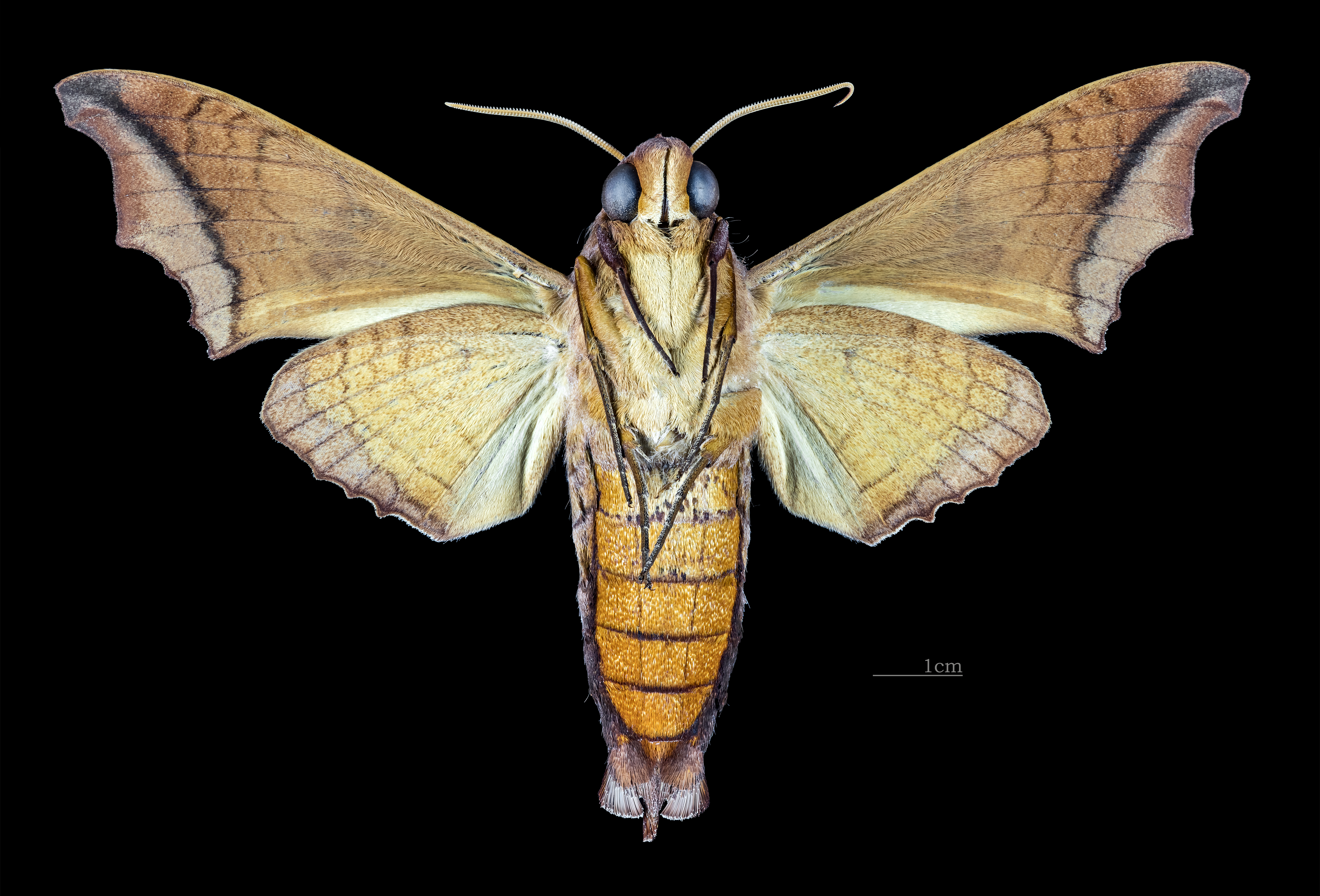
- Male ventral

Scientific classification
- Domain: Eukaryota
- Kingdom: Animalia
- Phylum: Arthropoda
- Class: Insecta
- Order: Lepidoptera
- Family: Sphingidae
- Genus: Nyceryx
- Species: N. stuarti

Binomial name
- Nyceryx stuarti (Rothschild, 1894)

Synonyms
- Pachygonia stuarti Rothschild, 1894

= Nyceryx stuarti =

Species of moth

Nyceryx stuarti is a species of moth in the family Sphingidae.

== Distribution ==
It is found from Costa Rica and Peru to Brazil, Bolivia and Paraguay.

== Description ==
The wingspan is about 66 mm. It is similar to Nyceryx riscus, but larger and darker and the forewing apex is distinctly truncate.

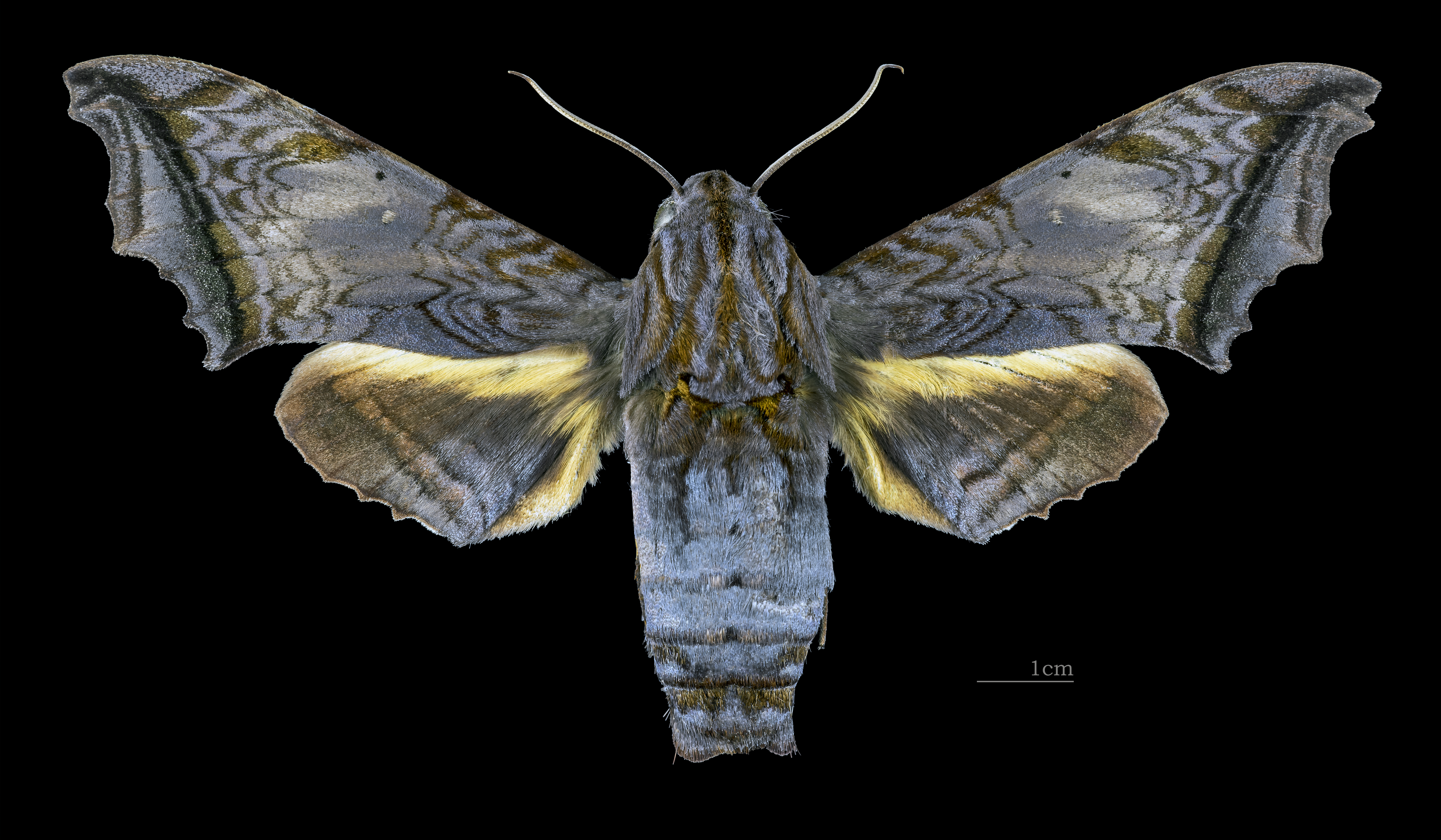
Female dorsal
(coll.MHNT)

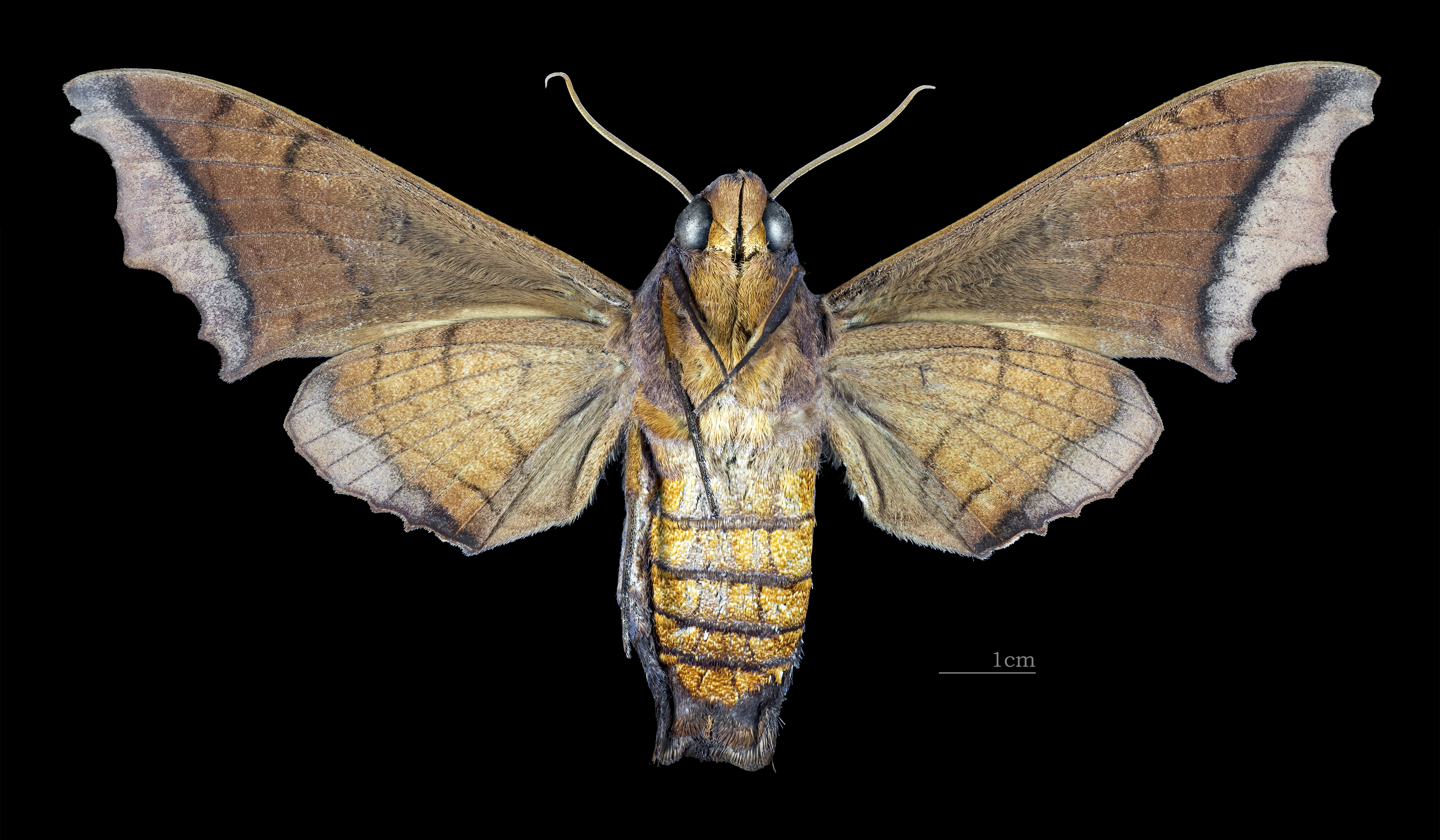
Female ventral
(coll.MHNT)
