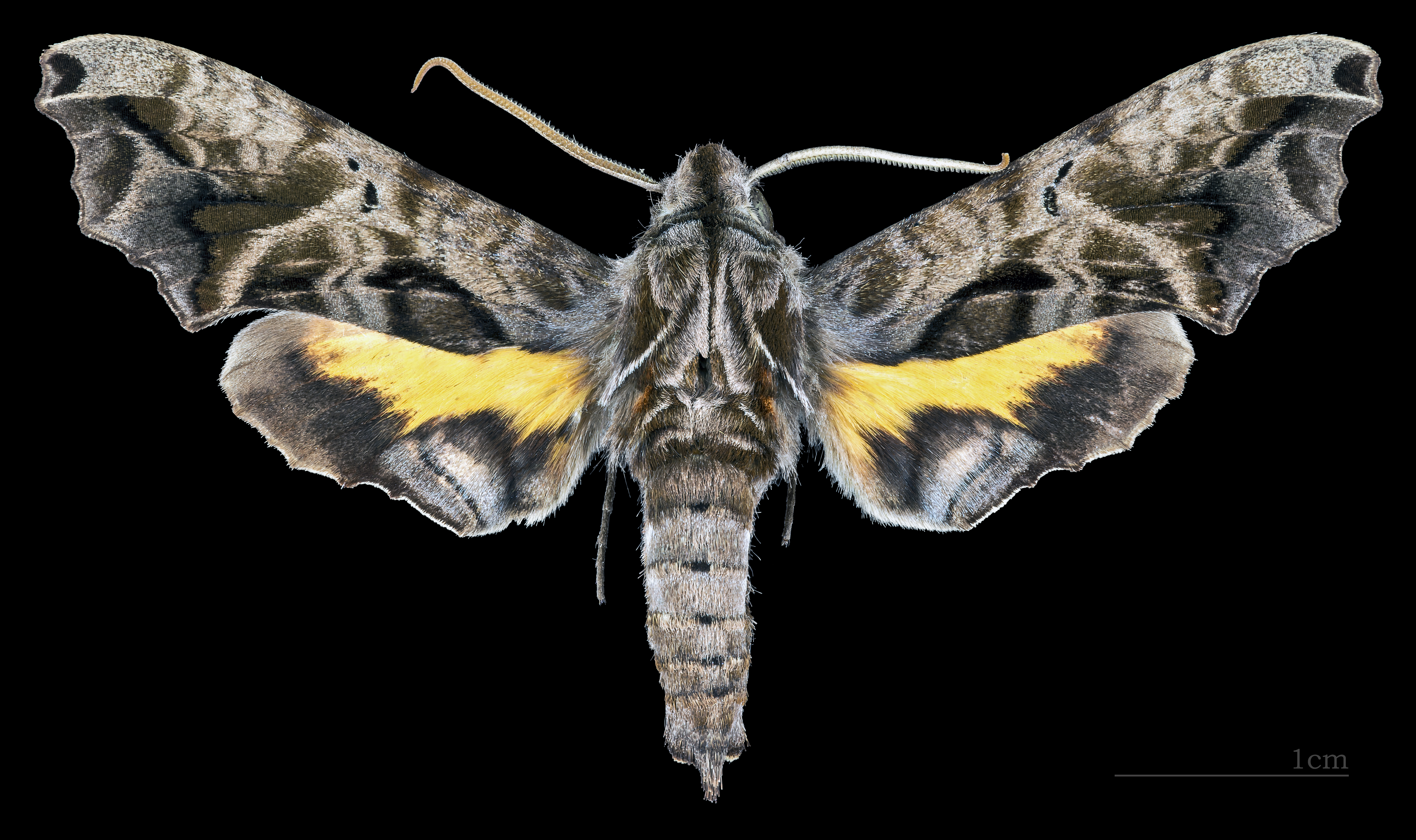
- Nyceryx alophus male dorsal
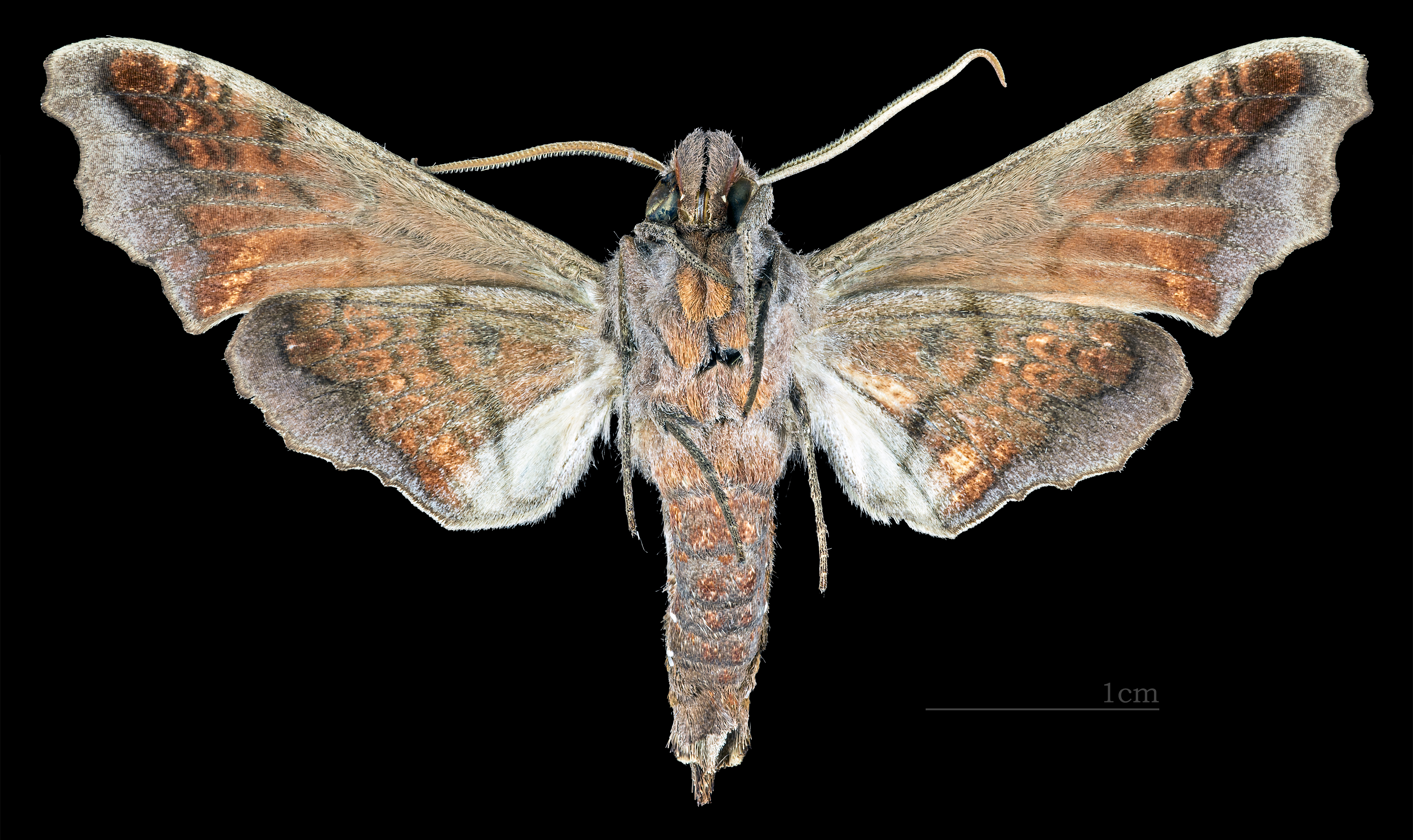
- Nyceryx alophus Male ventral

Scientific classification
- Domain: Eukaryota
- Kingdom: Animalia
- Phylum: Arthropoda
- Class: Insecta
- Order: Lepidoptera
- Family: Sphingidae
- Genus: Nyceryx
- Species: N. alophus

Binomial name
- Nyceryx alophus (Boisduval, 1875)

Synonyms
- Perigonia alophus Boisduval, 1875; Nyceryx alophus tristis Jörgensen, 1934

= Nyceryx alophus =

Species of moth

Nyceryx alophus is a moth of the family Sphingidae. It is found from Brazil to Bolivia, Argentina, Paraguay and Uruguay.

The wingspan is about 54 mm. It is similar to Nyceryx continua continua, but the forewing upperside is more variegated because the lines are more distinct. The discal spot is narrow and elongate and there is a subbasal blackish band. The hindwing upperside has a basal yellow area which reaches the inner margin.

Adults are probably on wing year round.

== Subspecies ==
- Nyceryx alophus alophus (Brazil to Bolivia, Argentina, Paraguay and Uruguay)
- Nyceryx alophus ixion Rothschild & Jordan, 1903 (Bolivia and Paraguay)
