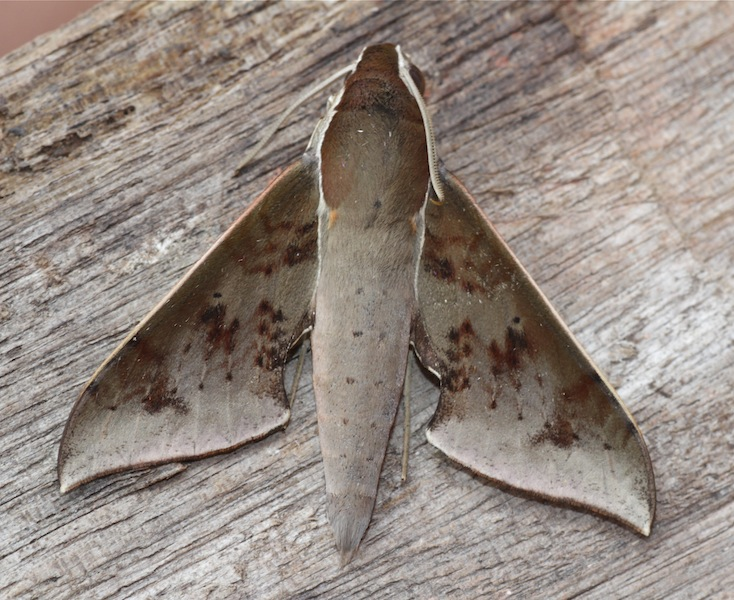

Scientific classification
- Kingdom: Animalia
- Phylum: Arthropoda
- Class: Insecta
- Order: Lepidoptera
- Family: Sphingidae
- Genus: Rhagastis
- Species: R. rubetra

Binomial name
- Rhagastis rubetra Rothschild & Jordan, 1907

Synonyms
- Rhagastis mjobergi Clark, 1923

= Rhagastis rubetra =

Species of moth

Rhagastis rubetra is a moth of the family Sphingidae. It is known from Indonesia (Kalimantan, Nias, Sumatra) north through Malaysia (Sarawak, Peninsular) to Thailand and possibly southern Tibet, China.

== Description ==
It is similar to Rhagastis acuta, Rhagastis hayesi and Rhagastis velata but distinguishable from the first two by the forewing upperside ground colour and from the last by the shape of the labial palp, which is strongly narrowed towards the base. The forewing upperside is similar to Rhagastis velata, but the ground colour ranges from pale grey to grey green (olive-green in Rhagastis velata). The intensity of the dark markings varies considerably from almost absent to strongly present.

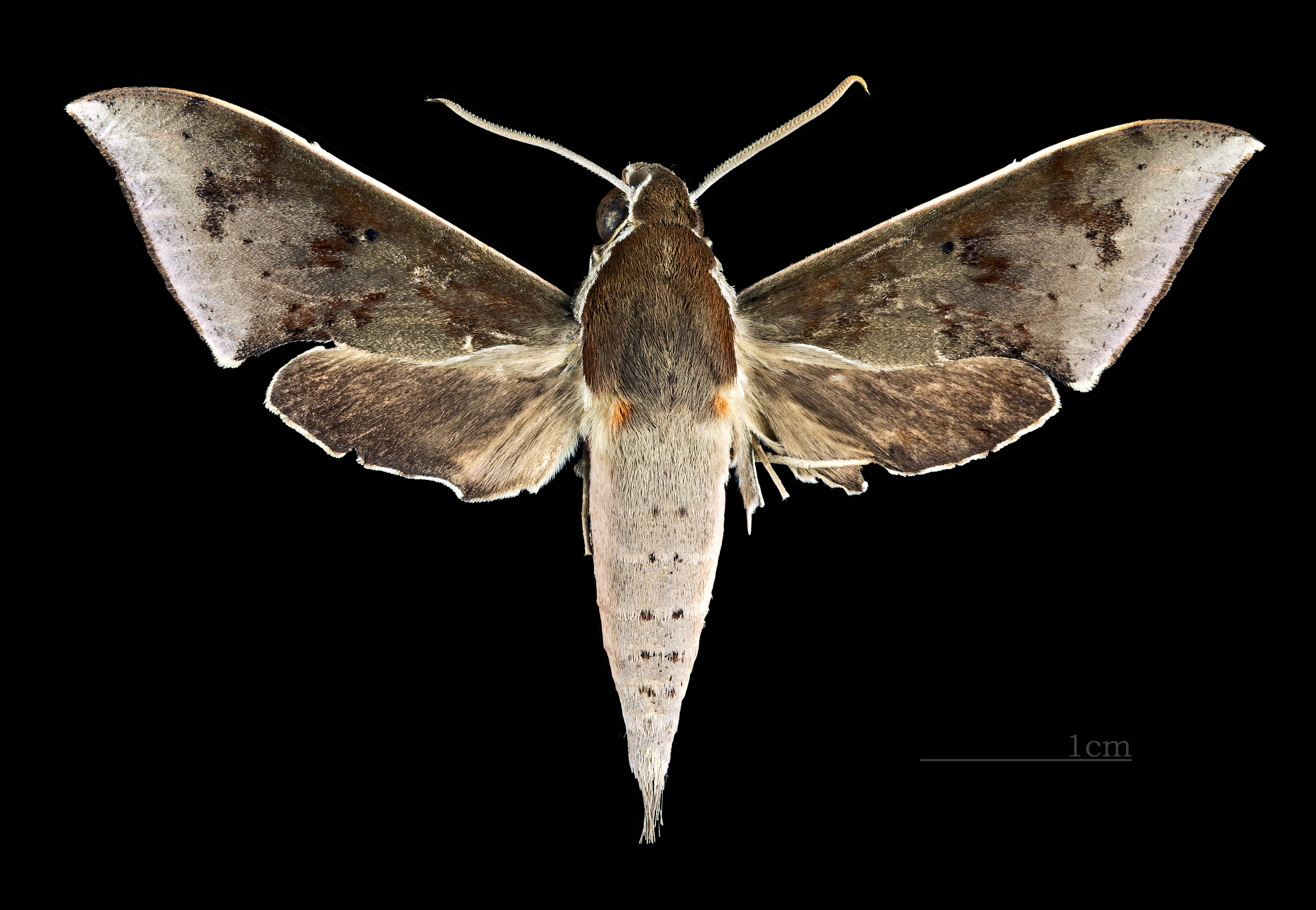
Dorsal MHNT

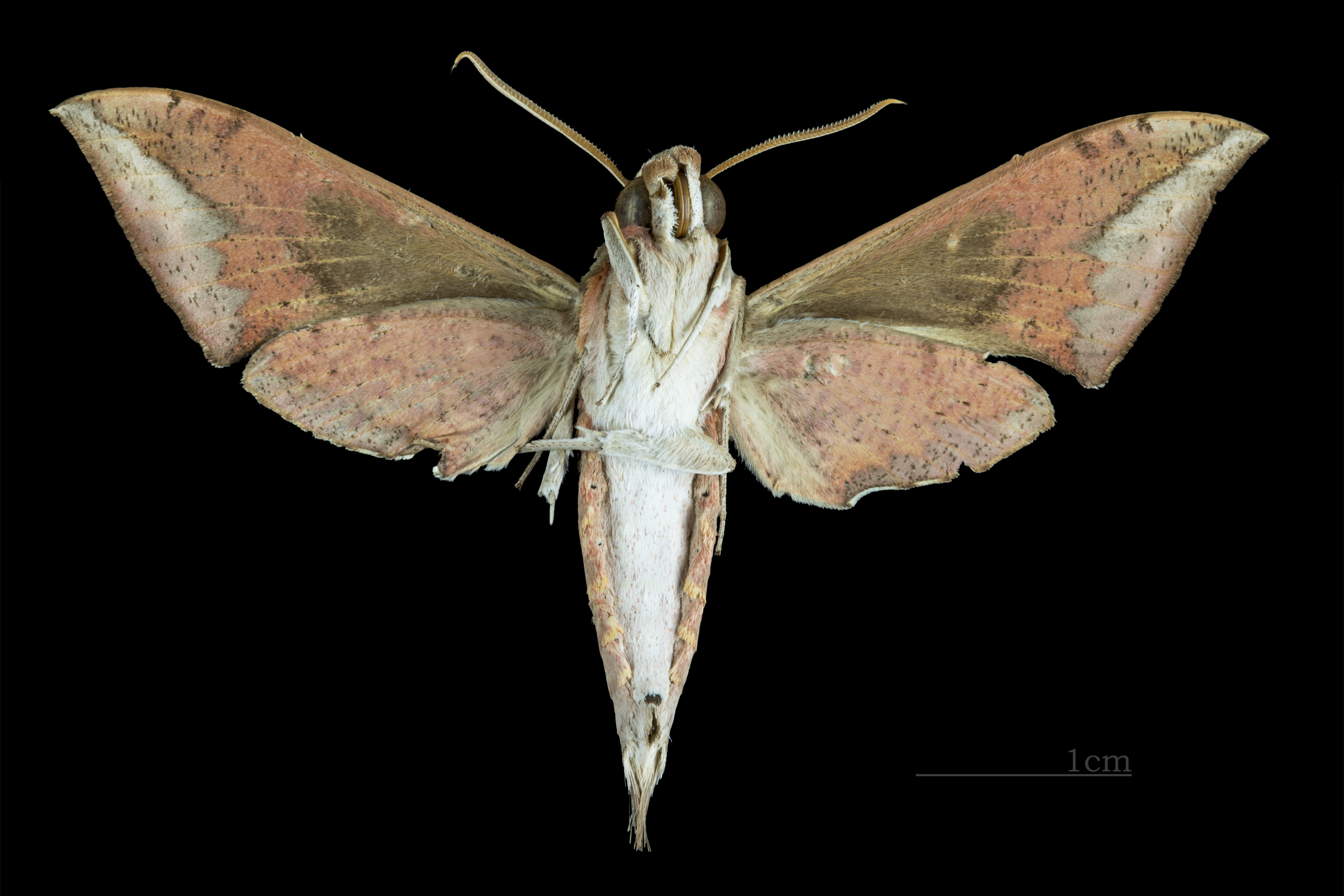
Ventral MHNT
