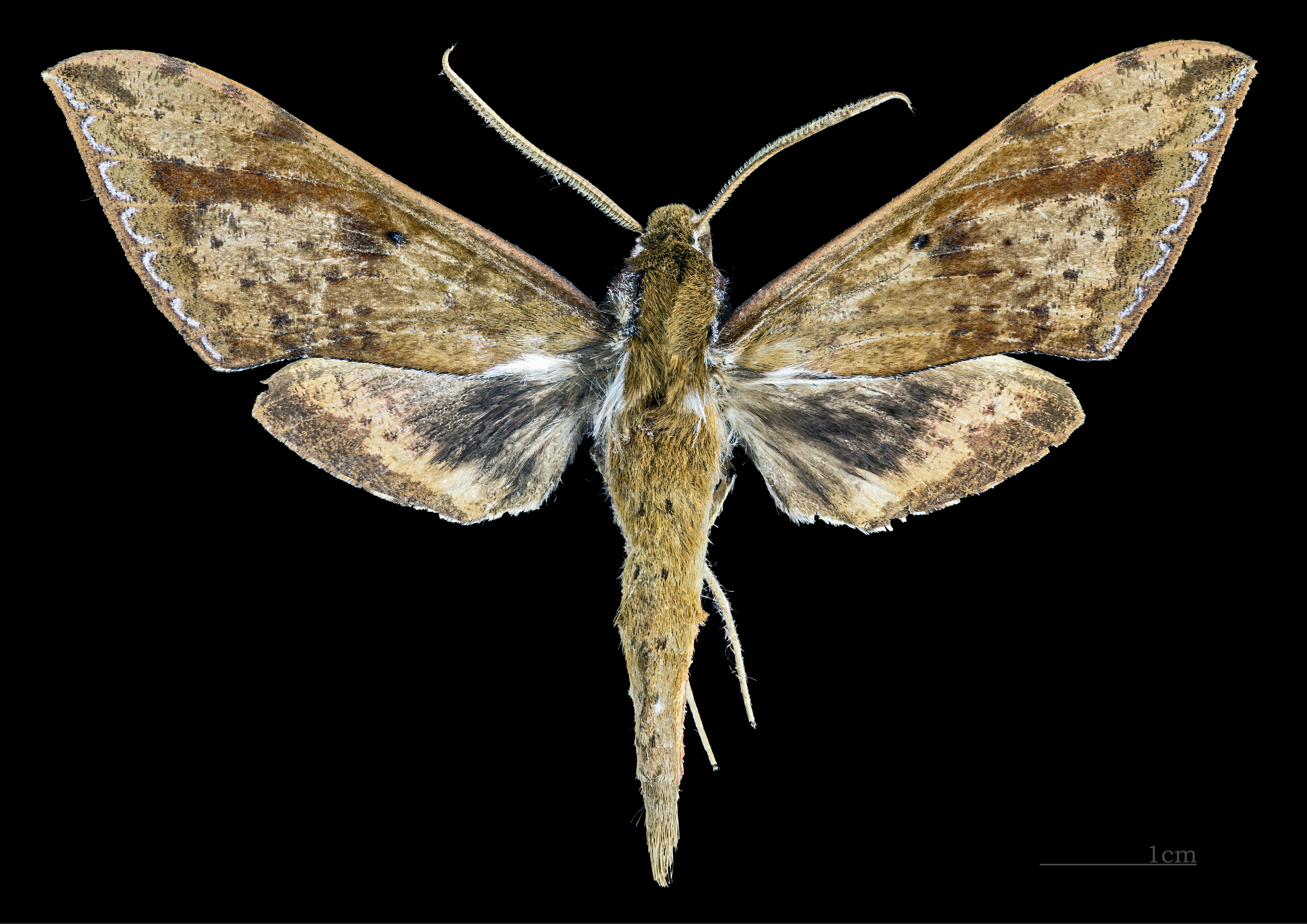
- Dorsal view
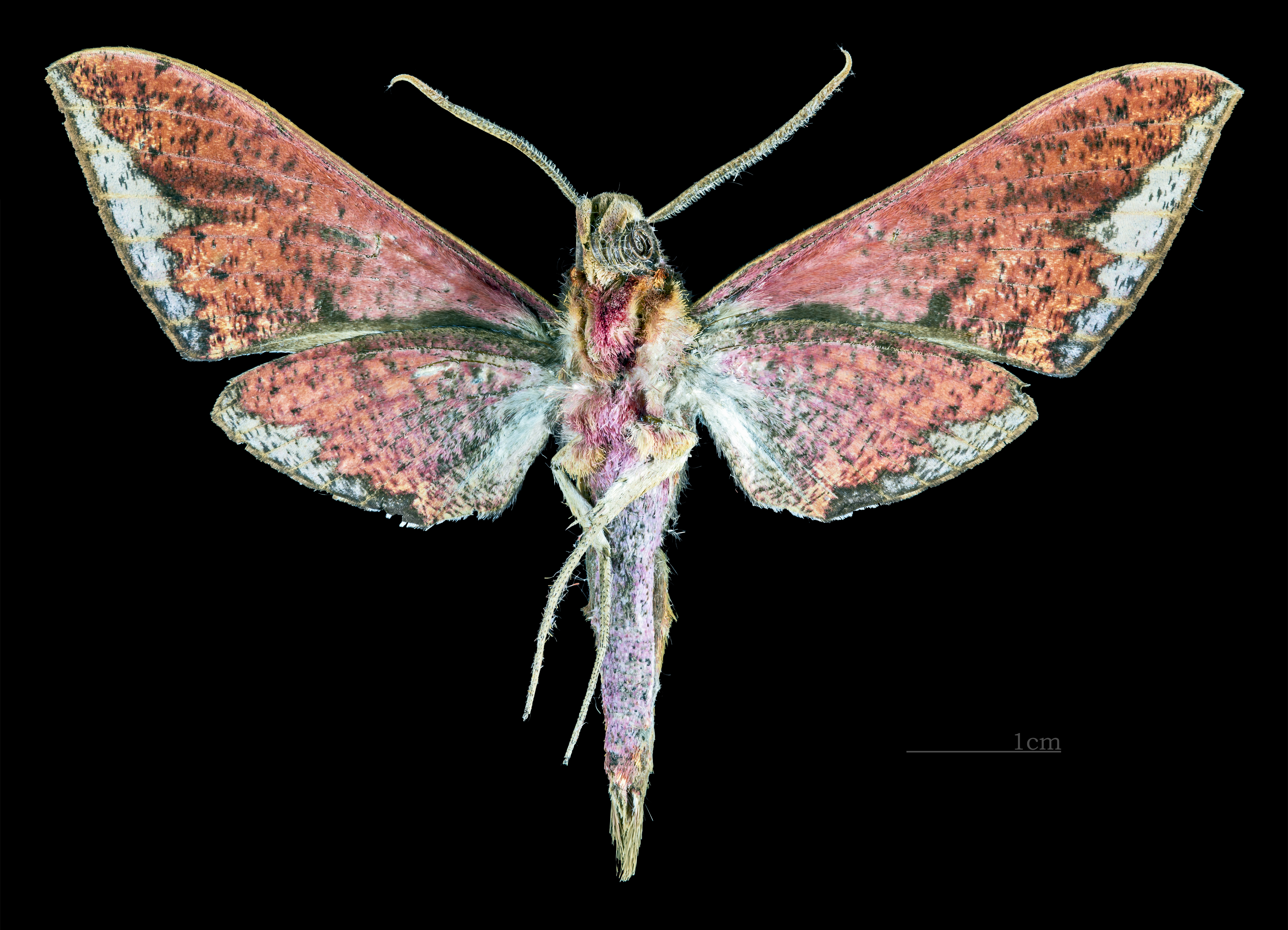
- Ventral view

Scientific classification
- Kingdom: Animalia
- Phylum: Arthropoda
- Class: Insecta
- Order: Lepidoptera
- Family: Sphingidae
- Genus: Rhagastis
- Species: R. lunata

Binomial name
- Rhagastis lunata (Rothschild, 1900)

Synonyms
- Choerocampa lunata Rothschild, 1900; Rhagastis lunata yunnanaria Chu & Wang, 1980; Rhagastis lunata yunnana Chu & Wang, 1983; Rhagastis lunata sikhimensis Rothschild & Jordan, 1903; Rhagastis lunata gehleni Bender, 1942

= Rhagastis lunata =

Species of moth

Rhagastis lunata, the lunulate mottled hawkmoth, is a moth of the family Sphingidae. It is known from Nepal, north-eastern India, Thailand, south-western China and Vietnam.

The wingspan is 72–86 mm. The antenna are longer and thicker than in all other Rhagastis species, except Rhagastis gloriosa (from which it differs in the lack of dark red bands on the forewing upperside, the apical black scaling being confined to the distal segments). The forewing upperside has a characteristic bluish-white submarginal line formed of crescent-shaped marks, the horns of which are directed basally. Both wings are pinkish-red, with traces of the ochreous ground colour distally. The black basal area of the forewing is reduced to a streak or patch behind the discal cell. The hindwing upperside has a well-defined orange-beige median band, including a series of vein dots.
