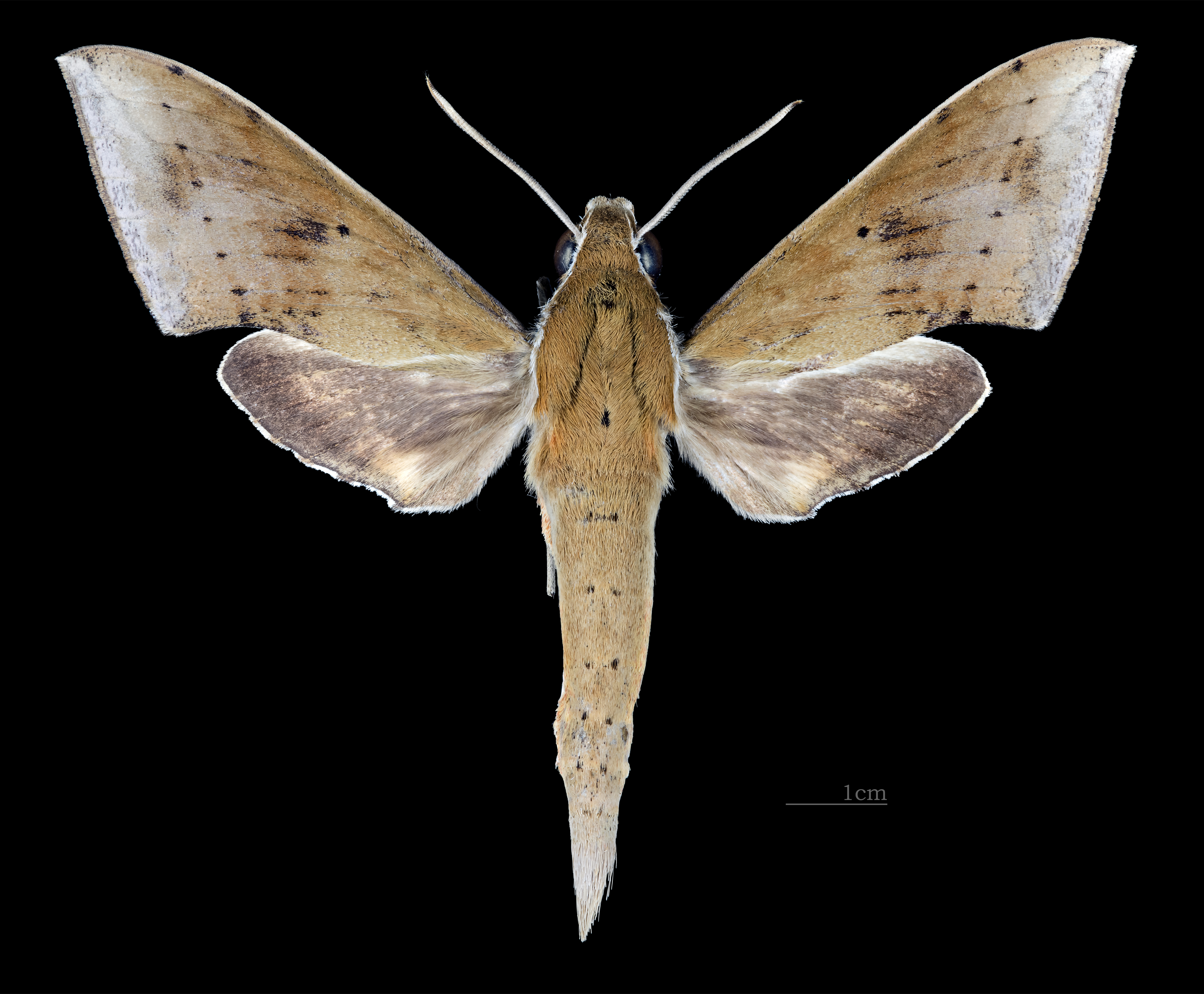

Scientific classification
- Kingdom: Animalia
- Phylum: Arthropoda
- Class: Insecta
- Order: Lepidoptera
- Family: Sphingidae
- Genus: Rhagastis
- Species: R. acuta

Binomial name
- Rhagastis acuta (Walker, 1856)

Synonyms
- Zonilia acuta Walker, 1856

= Rhagastis acuta =

Species of moth

Rhagastis acuta is a moth of the family Sphingidae. It is known from south-east Asia, including India, Thailand and Indonesia.

It is similar to Rhagastis velata and Rhagastis hayesi. The upperside of the abdomen has a pair of vestigial or well-developed lateral golden stripes. The forewing upperside is similar to Rhagastis castor aurifera. It has an olive-green tone. The forewing underside has postmedian dots and a submarginal band which is not joined to the basal area. The hindwing underside is without a small black discal spot.
