= Prunus incisoserrata =

Scientific classification
- Kingdom: Plantae
- Clade: Tracheophytes
- Clade: Angiosperms
- Clade: Eudicots
- Clade: Rosids
- Order: Rosales
- Family: Rosaceae
- Genus: Prunus
- Subgenus: Prunus subg. Padus
- Species: P. incisoserrata

Binomial name
- Prunus incisoserrata (T.T. Yu & T.C. Ku) J.Wen

Synonyms
- Maddenia incisoserrata T.T. Yu & T.C. Ku

Species of flowering plant

Prunus incisoserrata (Chinese: 锐齿臭樱, meaning "sharp-toothed flowering cherry") is a species of Prunus native to central China, preferring to grow at 1100–2900 m. It is a shrub reaching a height of 2–5 m. On Huangshan Mountain it is found growing beneath Prunus clarofolia and alongside fellow shrubs Symplocos paniculata, Hydrangea chinensis, Neillia hanceana, Morus australis and Kerria japonica.
