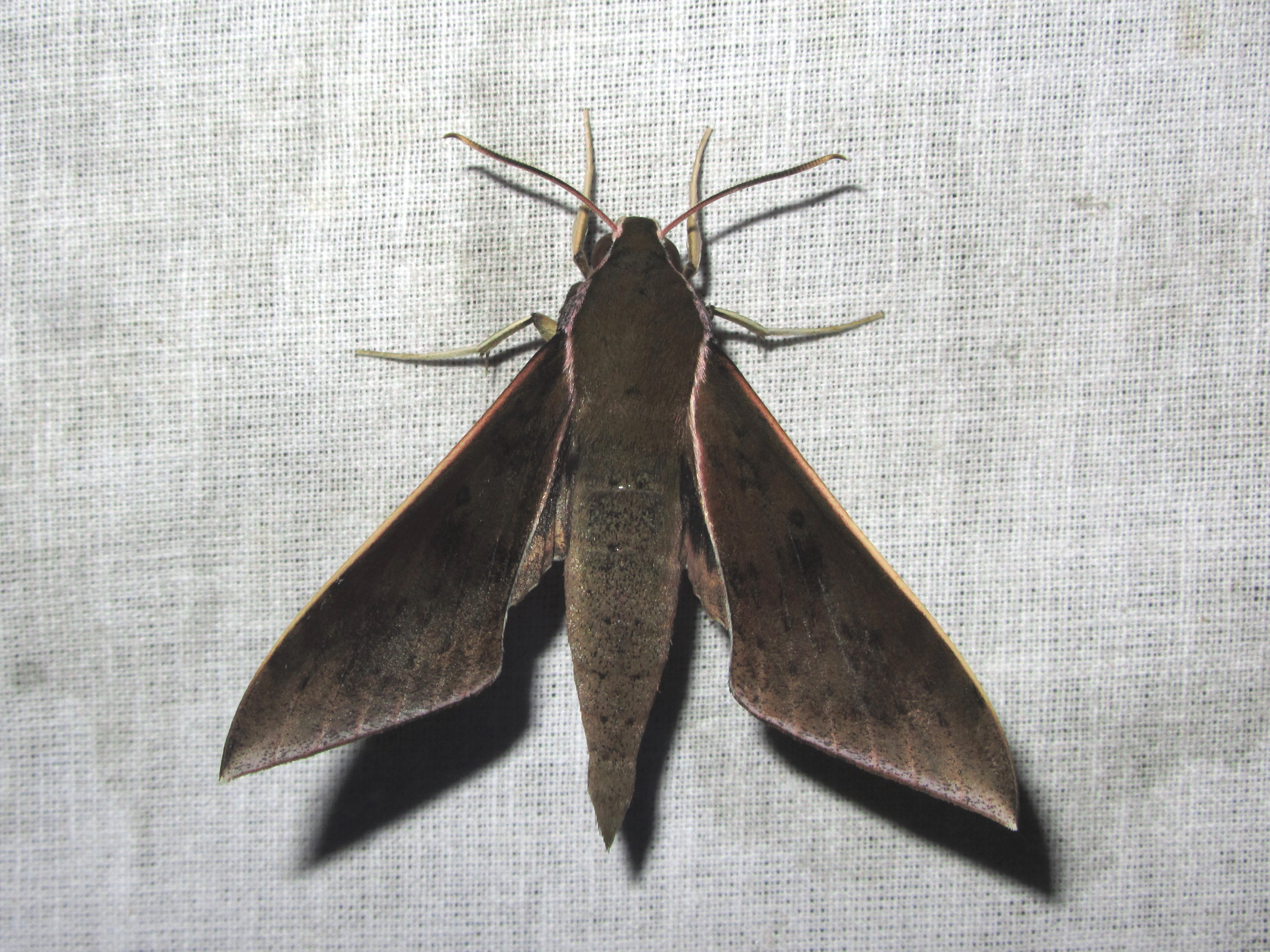

Scientific classification
- Kingdom: Animalia
- Phylum: Arthropoda
- Class: Insecta
- Order: Lepidoptera
- Family: Sphingidae
- Genus: Rhagastis
- Species: R. confusa

Binomial name
- Rhagastis confusa Rothschild & Jordan, 1903

Synonyms
- Rhagastis confusa peeti Clark, 1936; Rhagastis confusa chinensis Clark, 1936

= Rhagastis confusa =

Species of moth

Rhagastis confusa, the indistinct mottled hawkmoth, is a moth of the family Sphingidae.

== Distribution ==
It is known from northern India, Nepal, northern Thailand, south-western China and northern Vietnam.

== Description ==
The wingspan is 84–90 mm. It is similar to Rhagastis albomarginatus albomarginatus but distinguishable by the almost uniform olive-green ground colour of the forewing upperside and the lack of a small black discal spot on the hindwing underside.

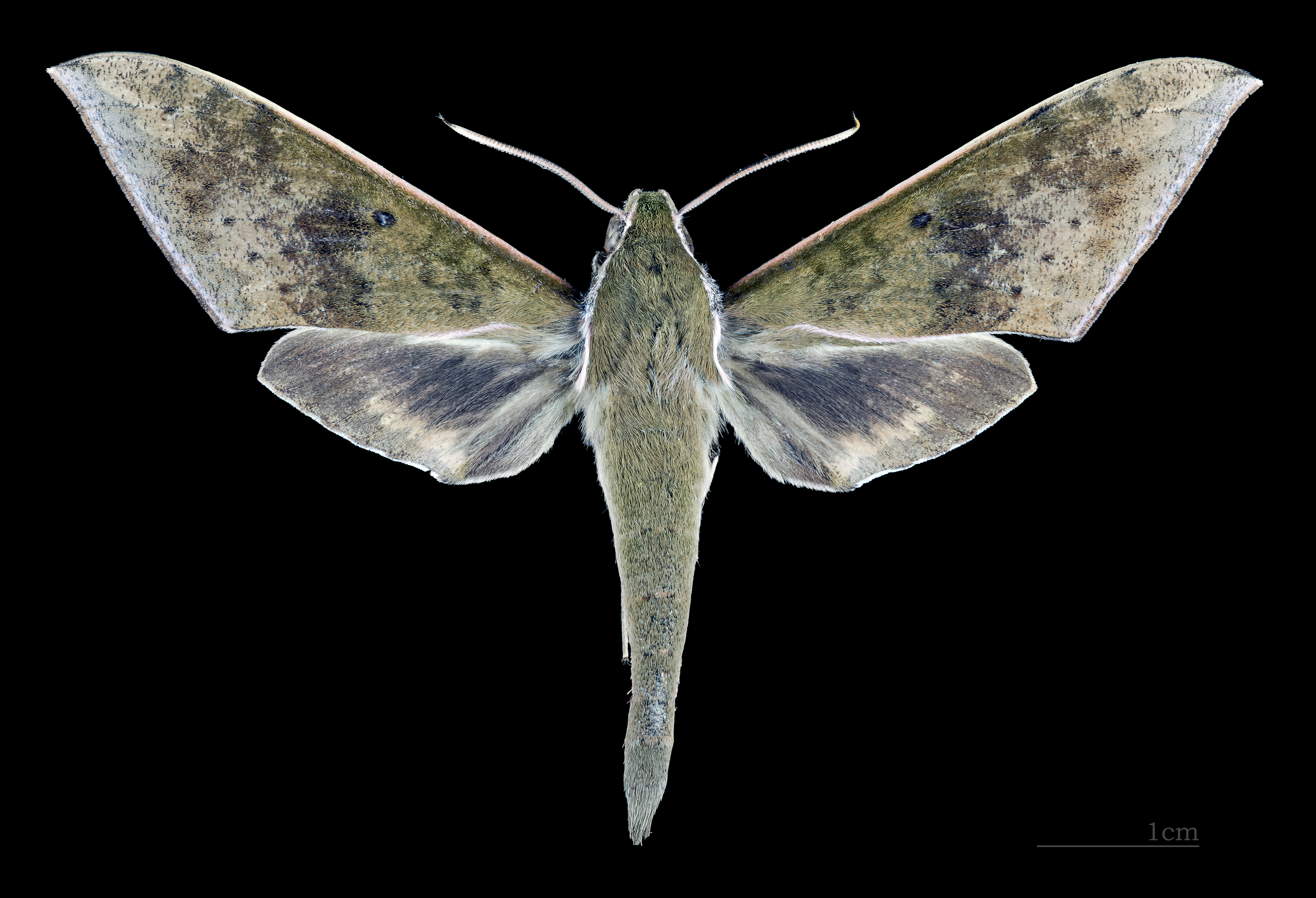
Dorsal view

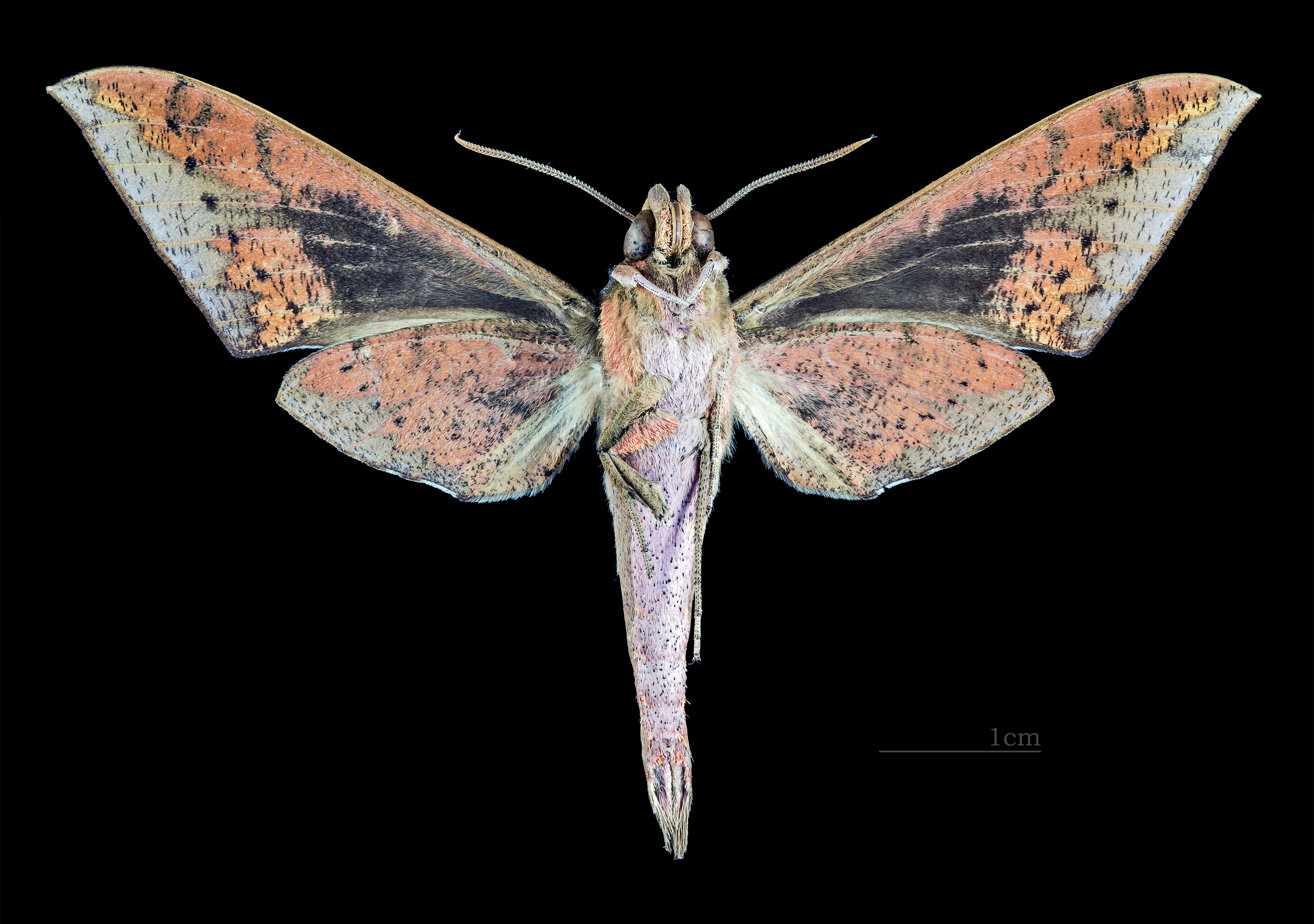
Ventral view

== Biology ==
Larvae have been recorded feeding on Vitis species in India.
