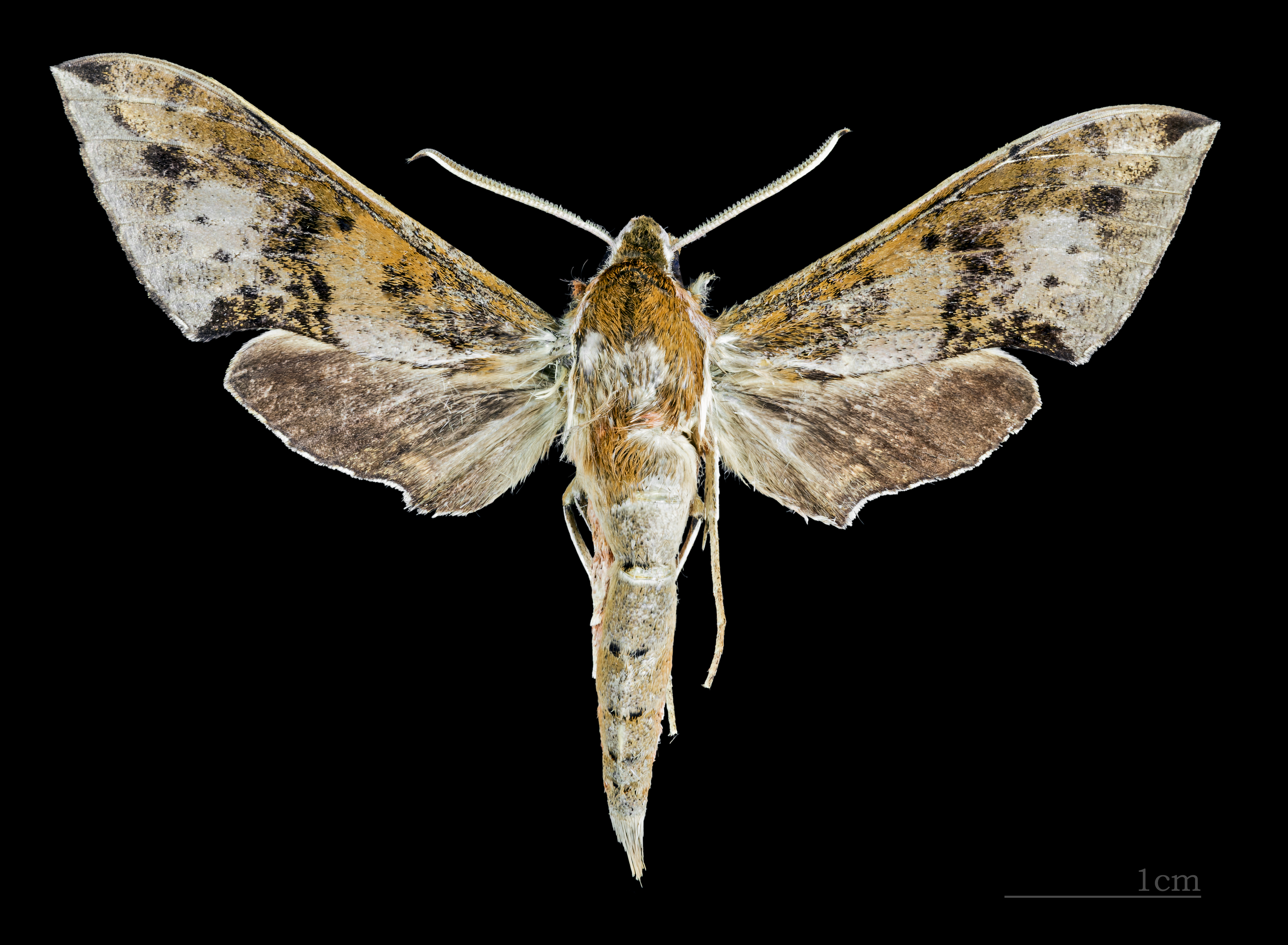
- Dorsal view (male)
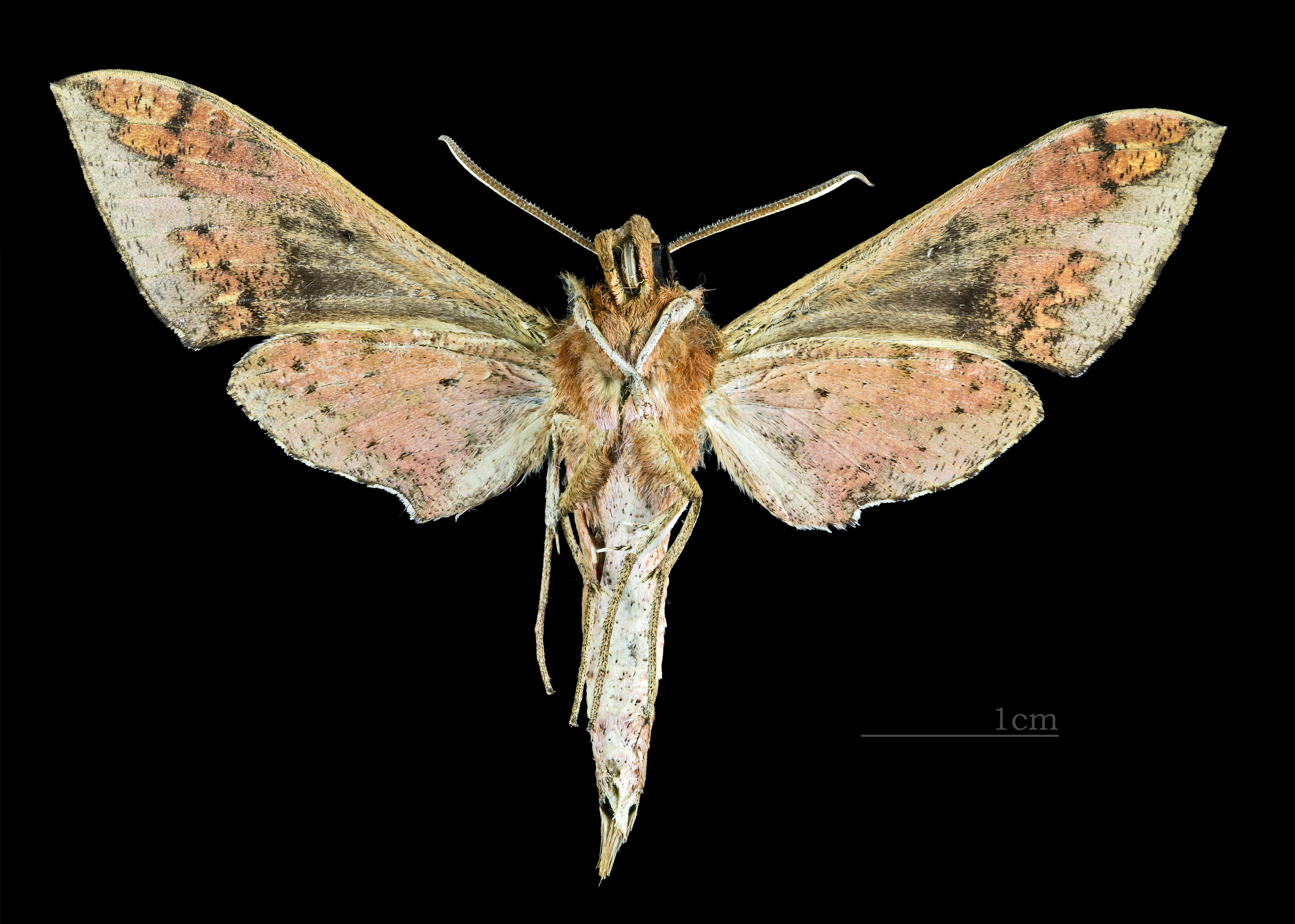
- Ventral view (male)

Scientific classification
- Kingdom: Animalia
- Phylum: Arthropoda
- Class: Insecta
- Order: Lepidoptera
- Family: Sphingidae
- Genus: Rhagastis
- Species: R. binoculata

Binomial name
- Rhagastis binoculata Matsumura, 1909

Synonyms
- Rhagastis varia Wileman, 1910; Rhagastis elongata Clark, 1937; Rhagastis albomarginatus sauteri Mell, 1958

= Rhagastis binoculata =

Species of moth

Rhagastis binoculata is a moth of the family Sphingidae. It is endemic to Taiwan where it is widespread.

The wingspan is 54–63 mm. Adults can be active throughout the year. Larvae have been recorded feeding on Hydrangea chinensis.
