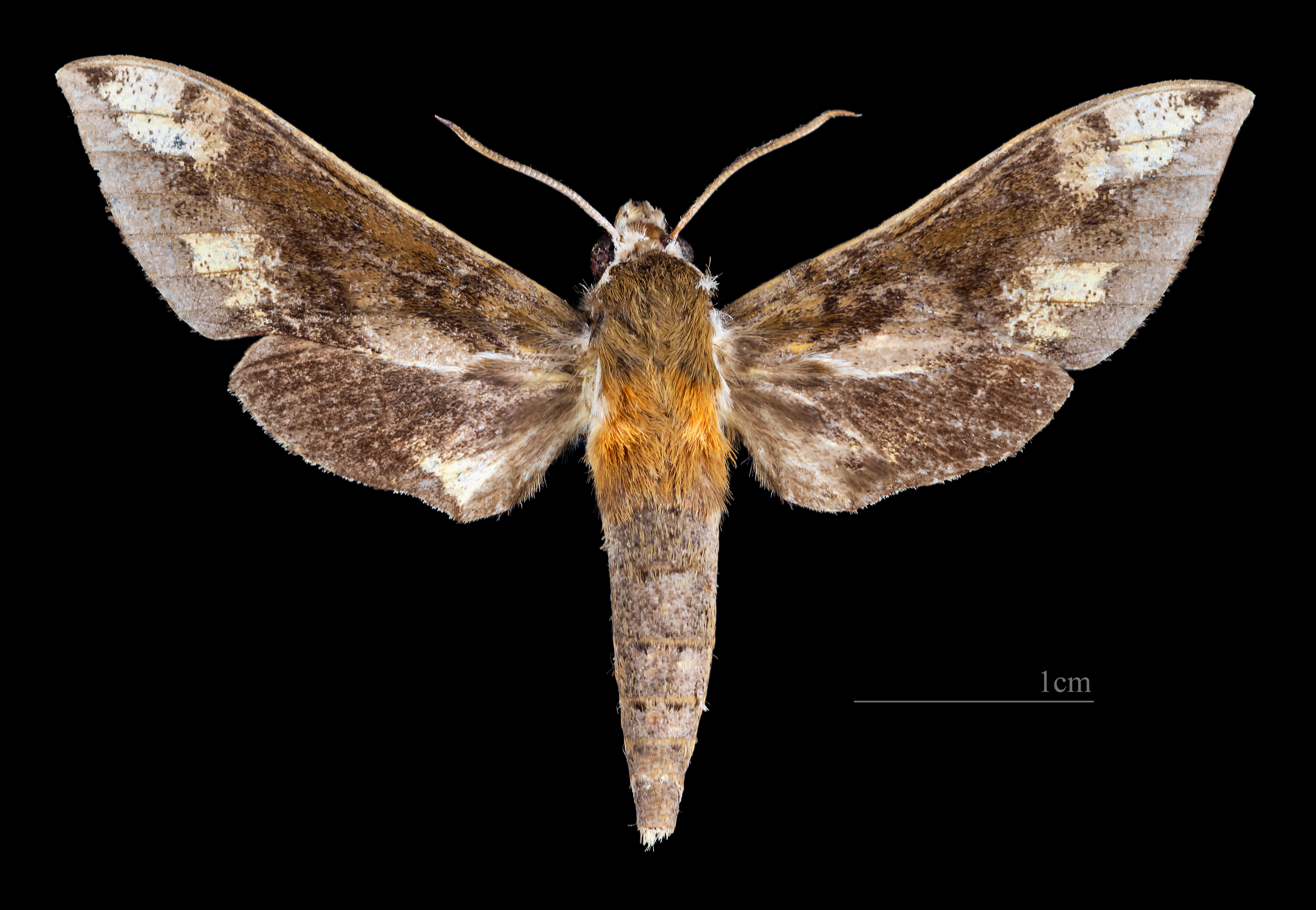
- Rhagastis trilineata ♂
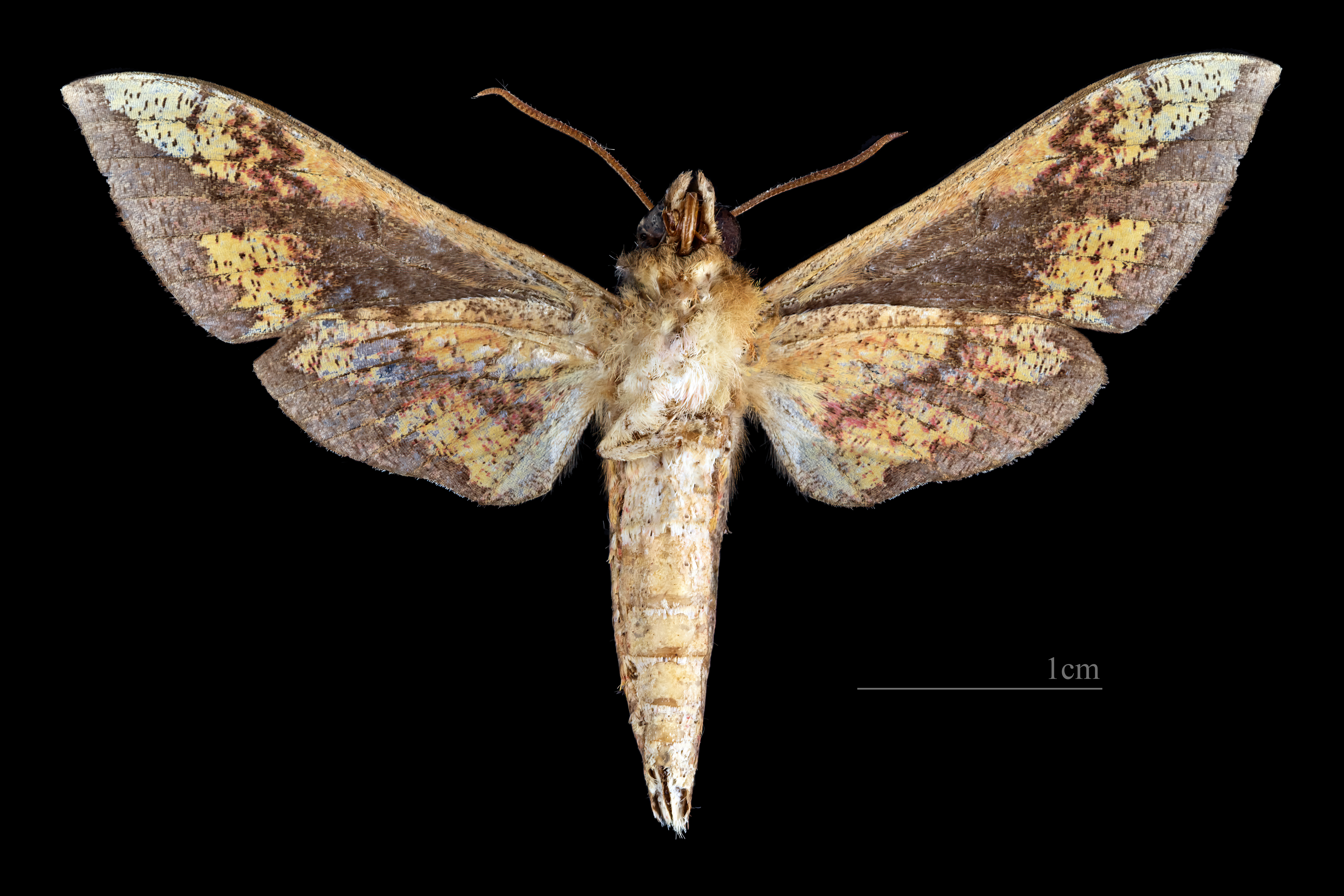
- Rhagastis trilineata ♂ △

Scientific classification
- Kingdom: Animalia
- Phylum: Arthropoda
- Clade: Pancrustacea
- Class: Insecta
- Order: Lepidoptera
- Family: Sphingidae
- Genus: Rhagastis
- Species: R. trilineata

Binomial name
- Rhagastis trilineata Matsumura, 1921

= Rhagastis trilineata =

Species of moth

Rhagastis trilineata is a moth of the family Sphingidae. It is known from Japan.
