= Rhagastis diehli =

Scientific classification
- Kingdom: Animalia
- Phylum: Arthropoda
- Class: Insecta
- Order: Lepidoptera
- Family: Sphingidae
- Genus: Rhagastis
- Species: R. diehli

Binomial name
- Rhagastis diehli Haxaire & Melichar, 2010

Species of moth

Rhagastis diehli is a moth of the family Sphingidae. It is known from Sumatra.
