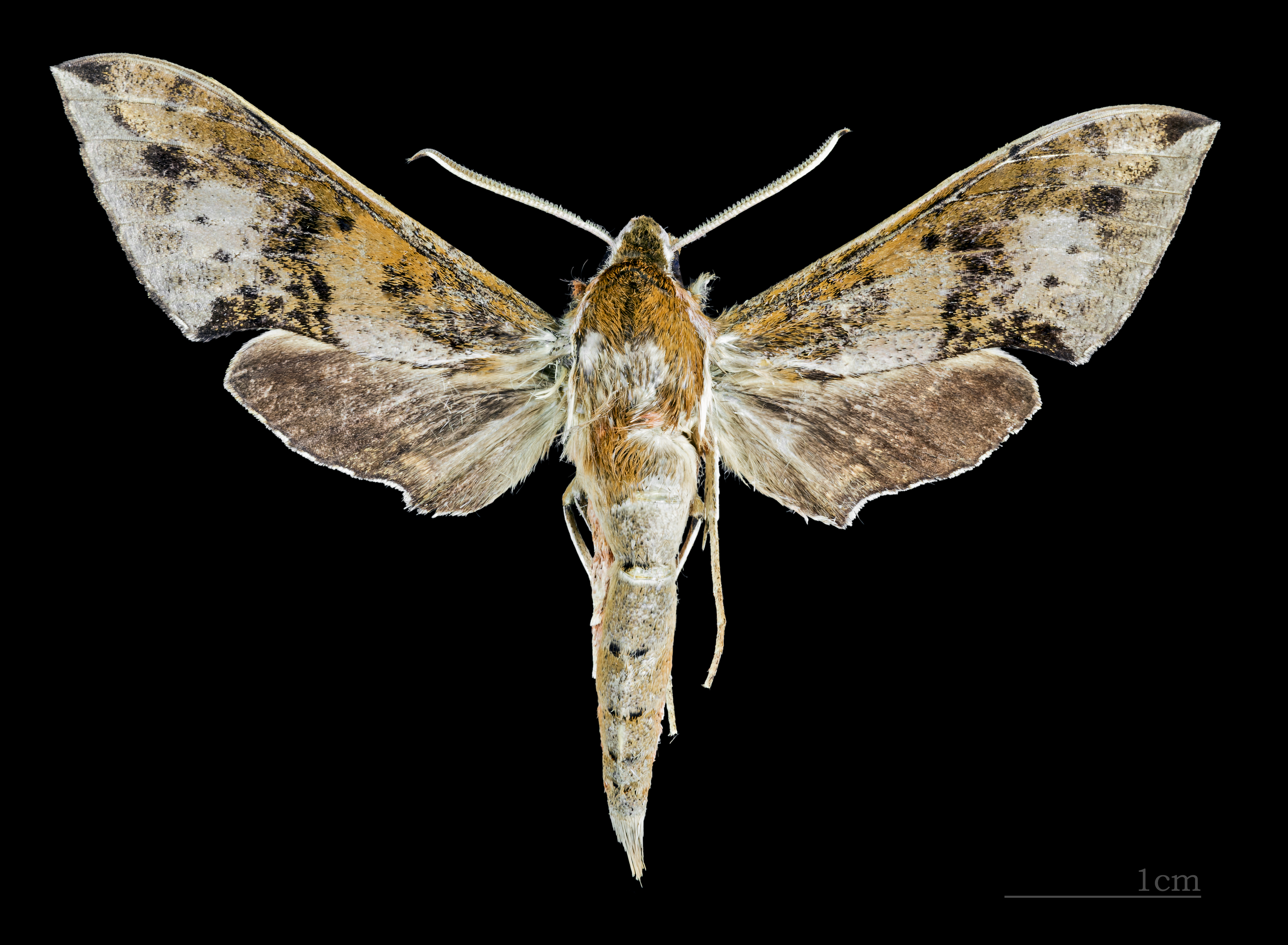

Scientific classification
- Kingdom: Animalia
- Phylum: Arthropoda
- Class: Insecta
- Order: Lepidoptera
- Family: Sphingidae
- Subtribe: Choerocampina
- Genus: Rhagastis; Rothschild & Jordan, 1903

Type species
- Pergesa velata Walker, 1853

= Rhagastis =

Genus of moths

Rhagastis is a genus of moths in the family Sphingidae first described by Walter Rothschild and Karl Jordan in 1903.

== Species ==
- Rhagastis acuta (Walker 1856)
- Rhagastis albomarginatus (Rothschild 1894)
- Rhagastis binoculata Matsumura 1909
- Rhagastis castor (Walker 1856)
- Rhagastis confusa Rothschild & Jordan 1903
- Rhagastis diehli Haxaire & Melichar, 2010
- Rhagastis gloriosa (Butler 1875)
- Rhagastis hayesi Diehl 1982
- Rhagastis lambertoni (Clark 1923)
- Rhagastis lunata (Rothschild 1900)
- Rhagastis meridionalis Gehlen, 1928
- Rhagastis mongoliana (Butler 1876)
- Rhagastis olivacea (Moore 1872)
- Rhagastis rubetra Rothschild & Jordan 1907
- Rhagastis trilineata Matsumura 1921
- Rhagastis velata (Walker 1866)

== Gallery ==
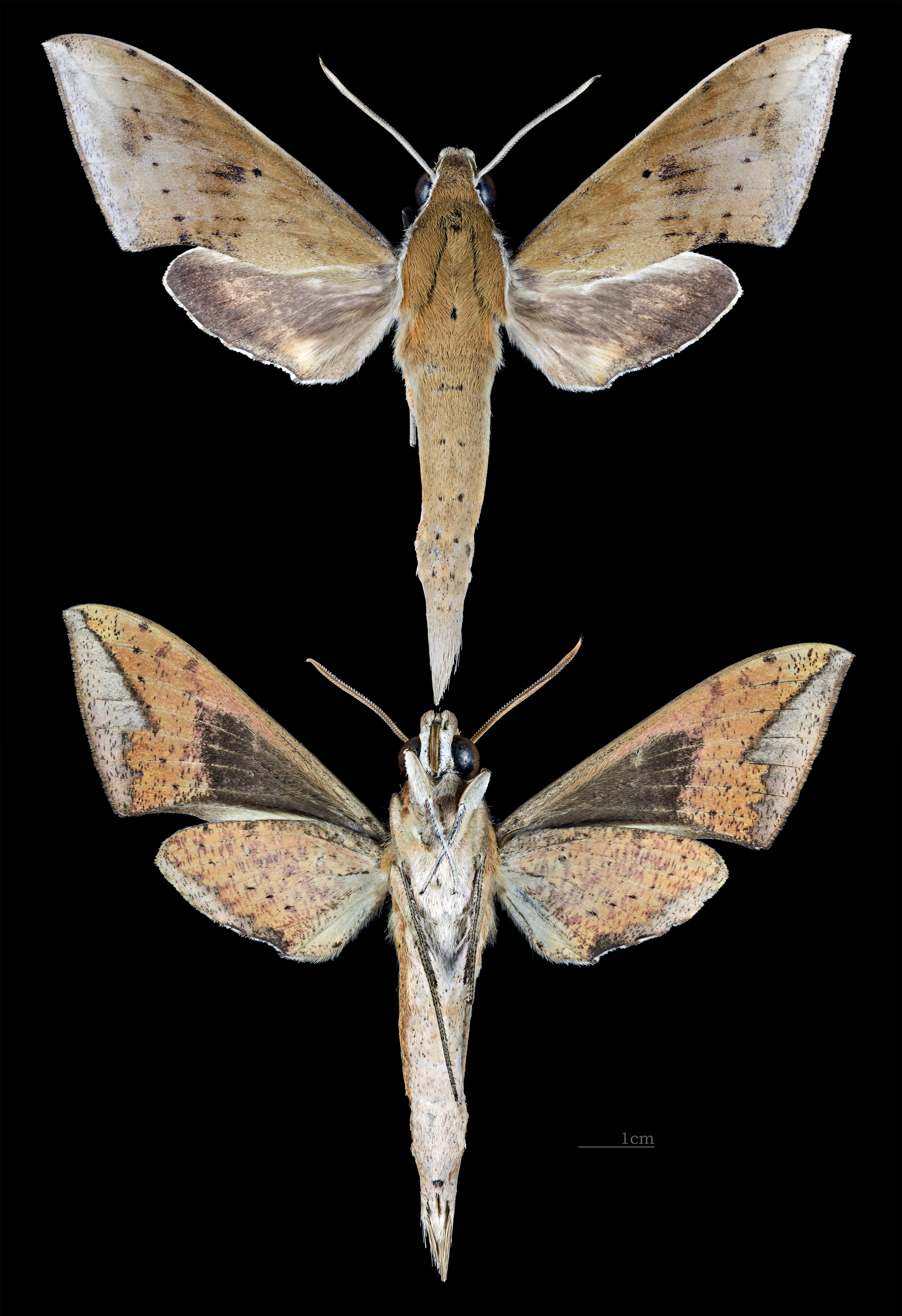
Rhagastis acuta

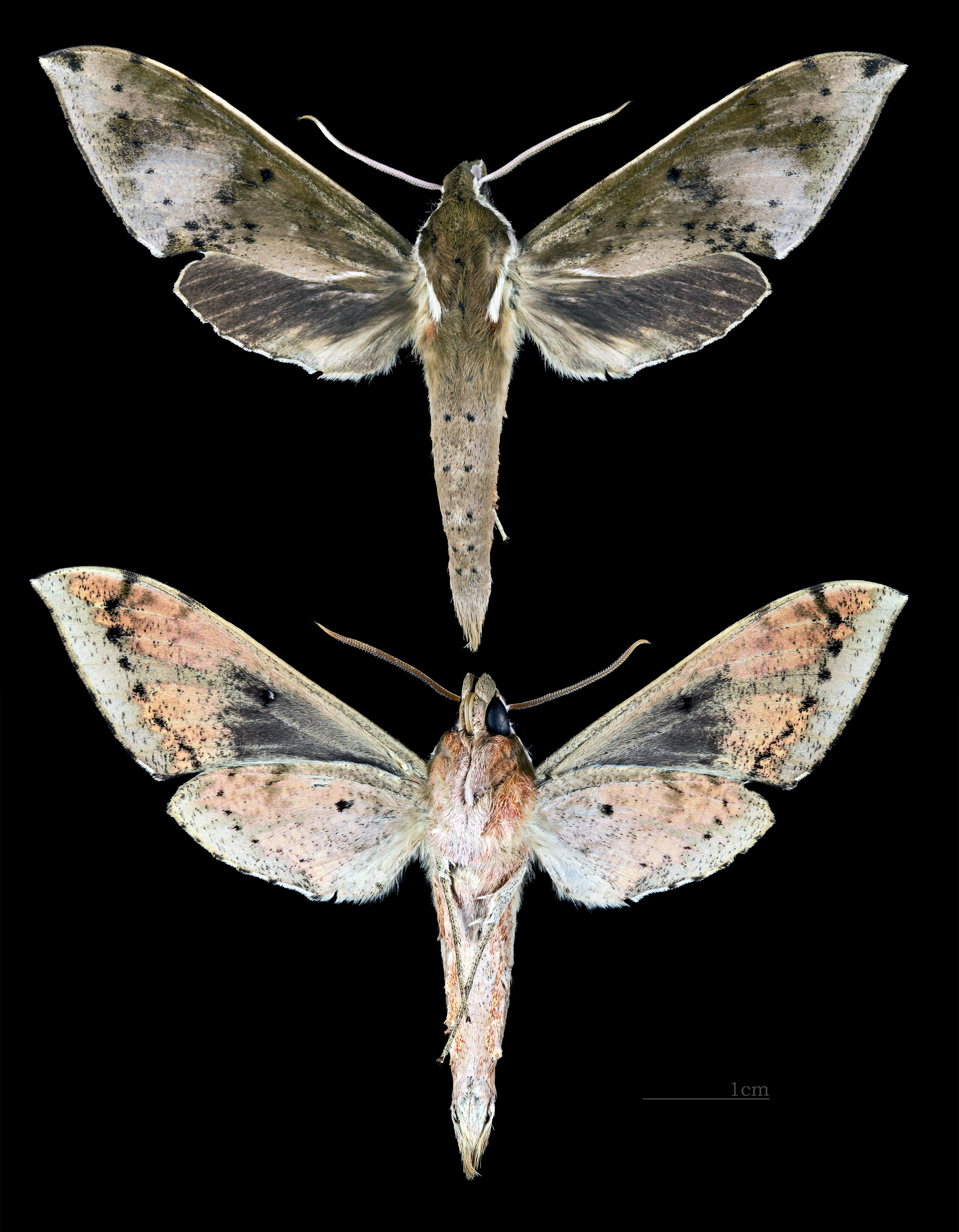
Rhagastis albomarginatus

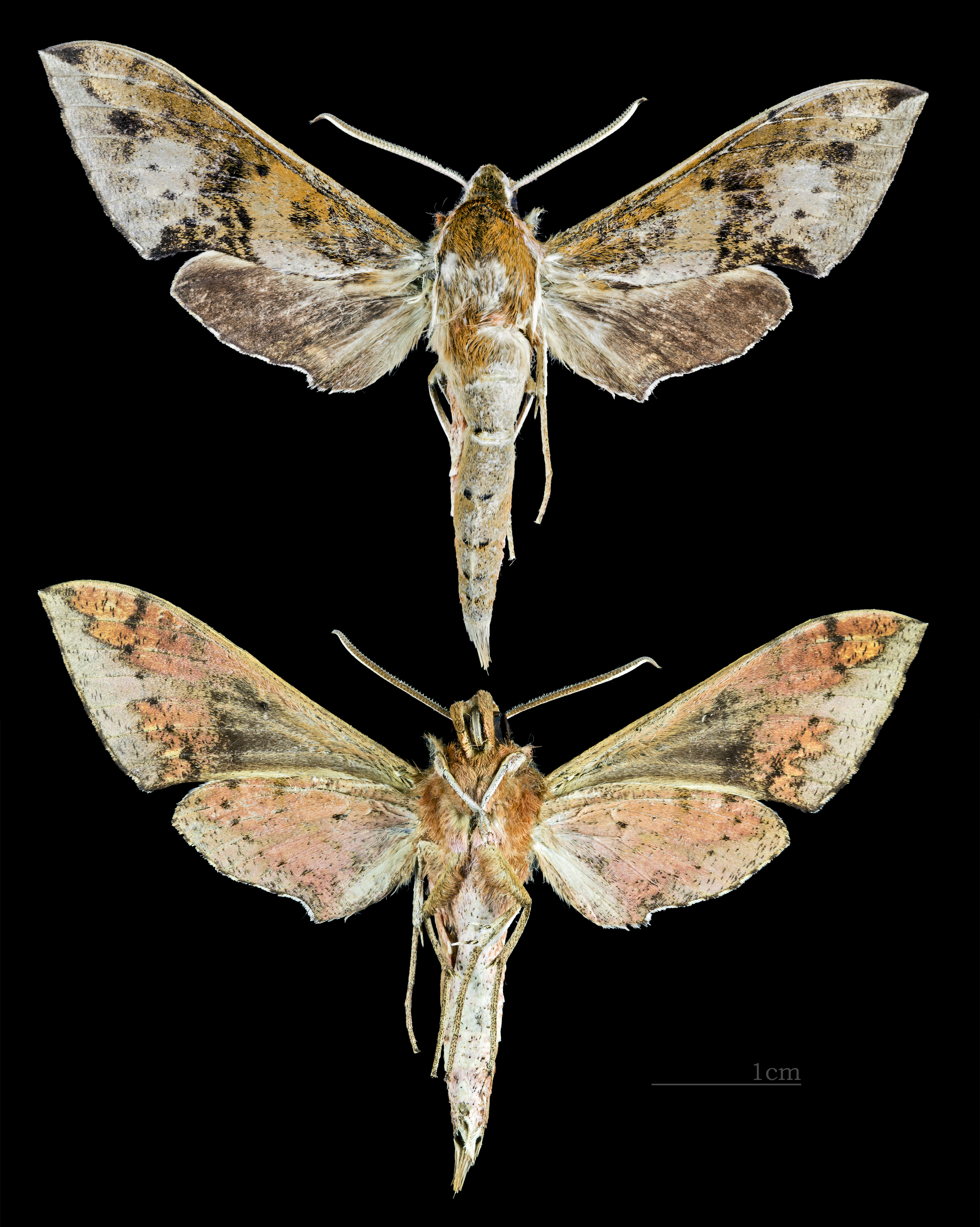
Rhagastis binoculata

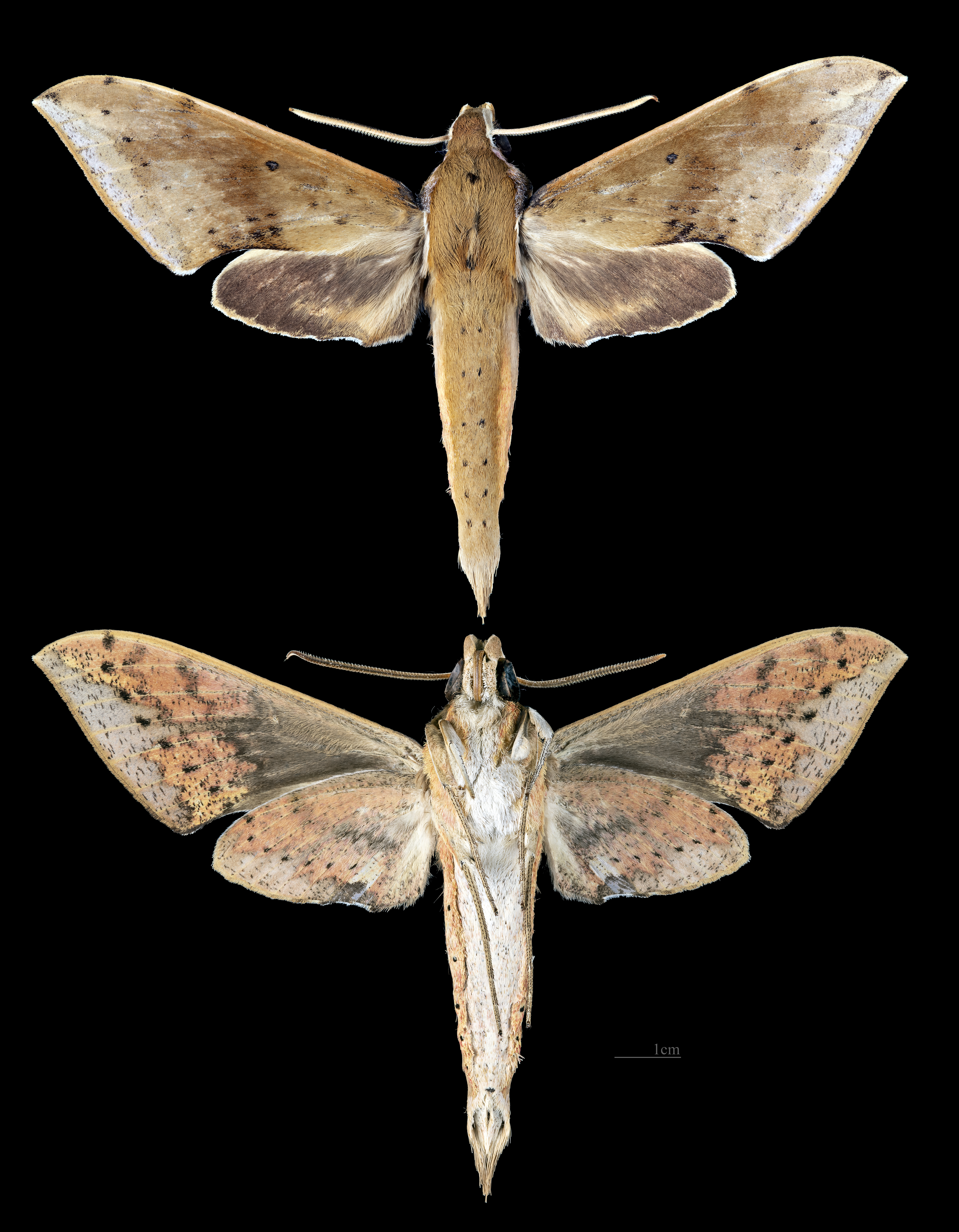
Rhagastis castor

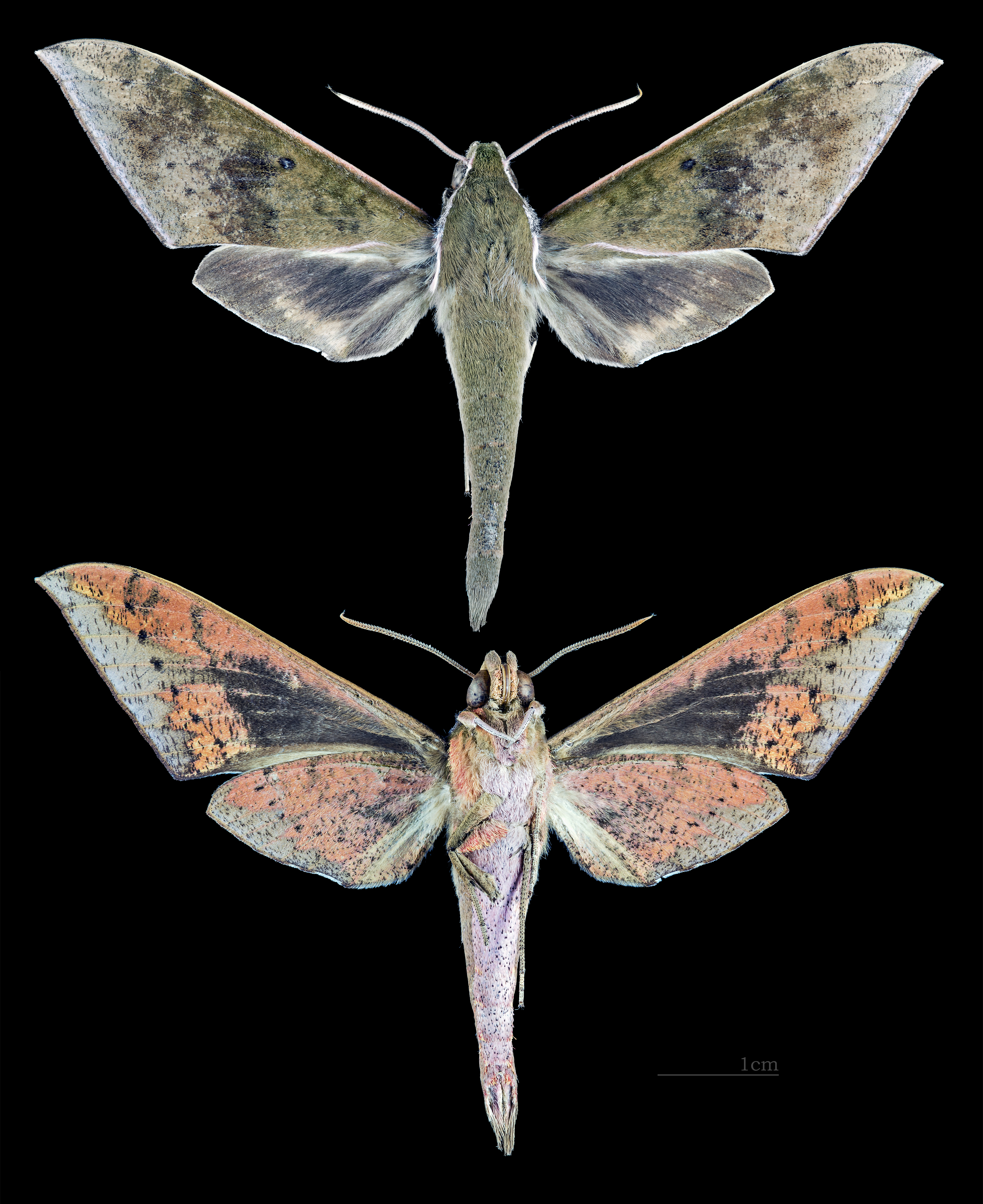
Rhagastis confusa

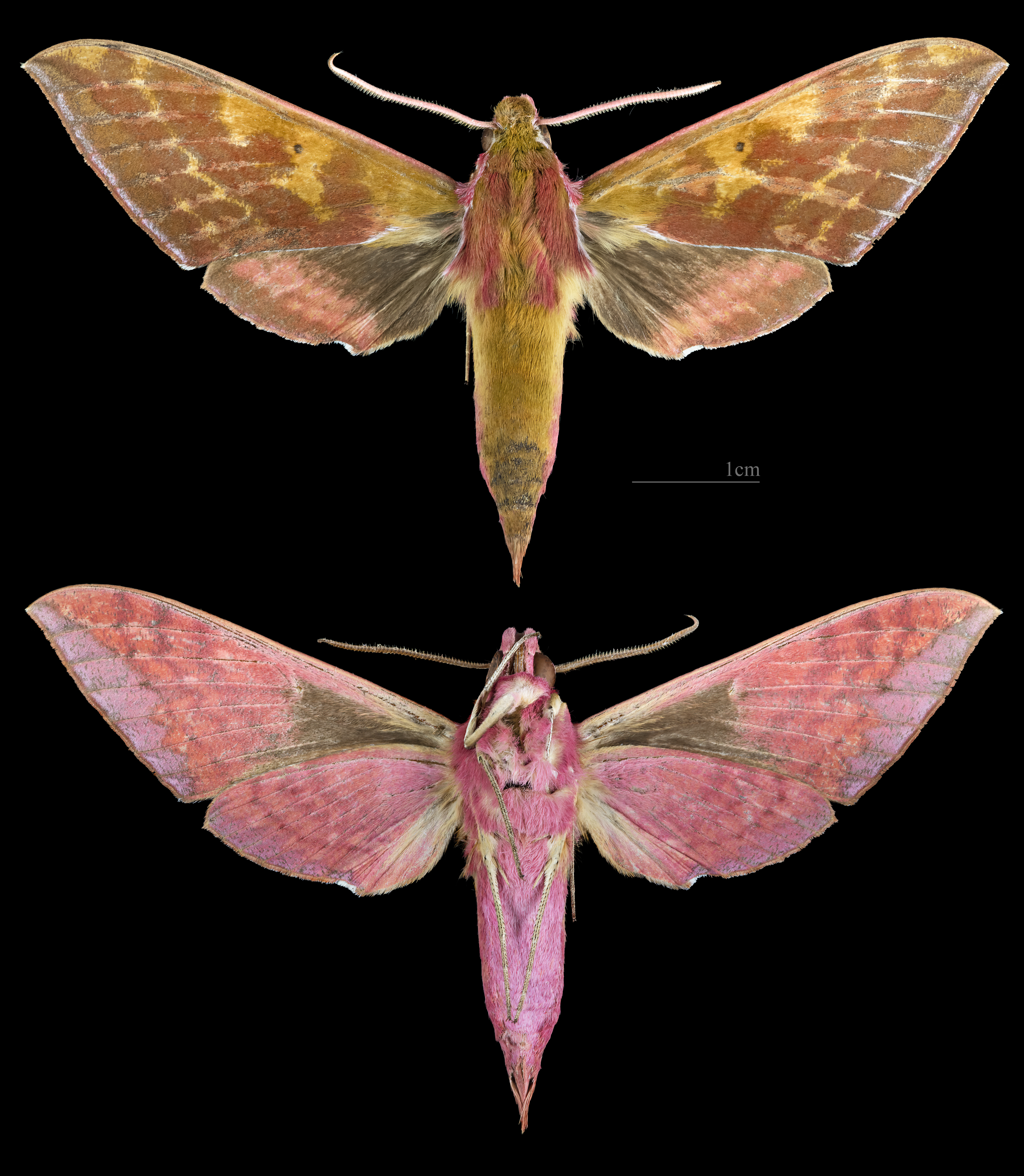
Rhagastis gloriosa

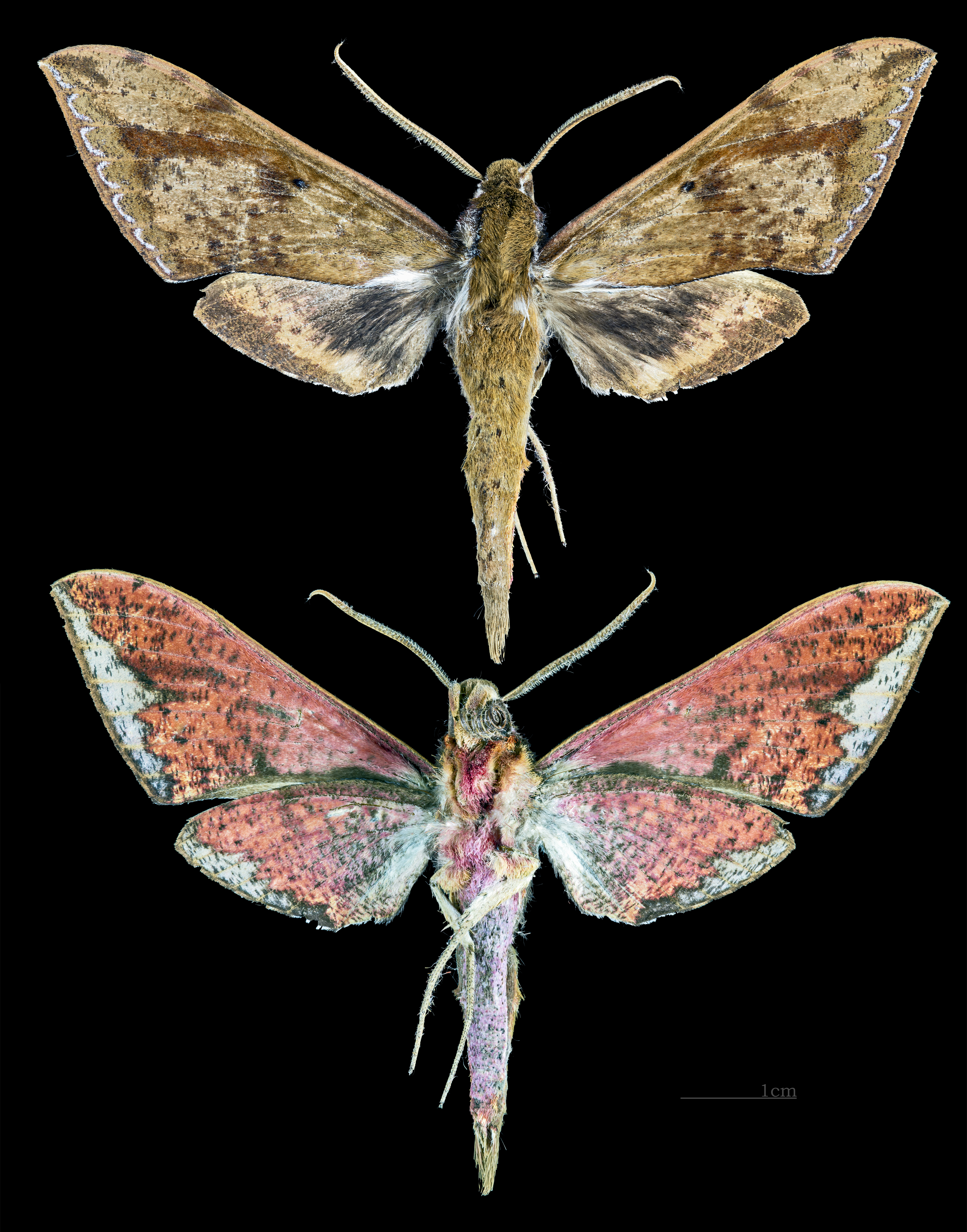
Rhagastis lunata

Rhagastis mongoliana

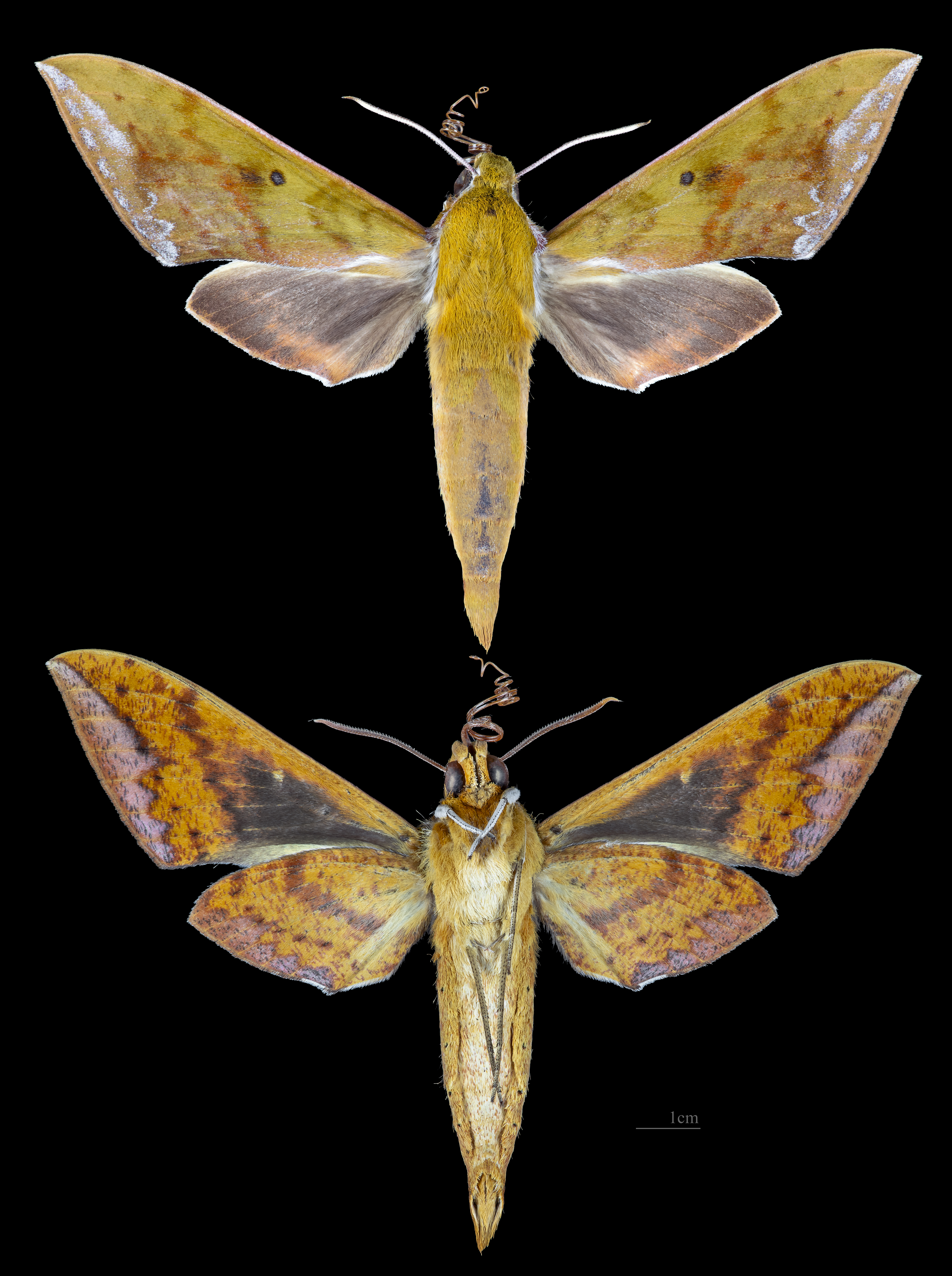
Rhagastis olivacea

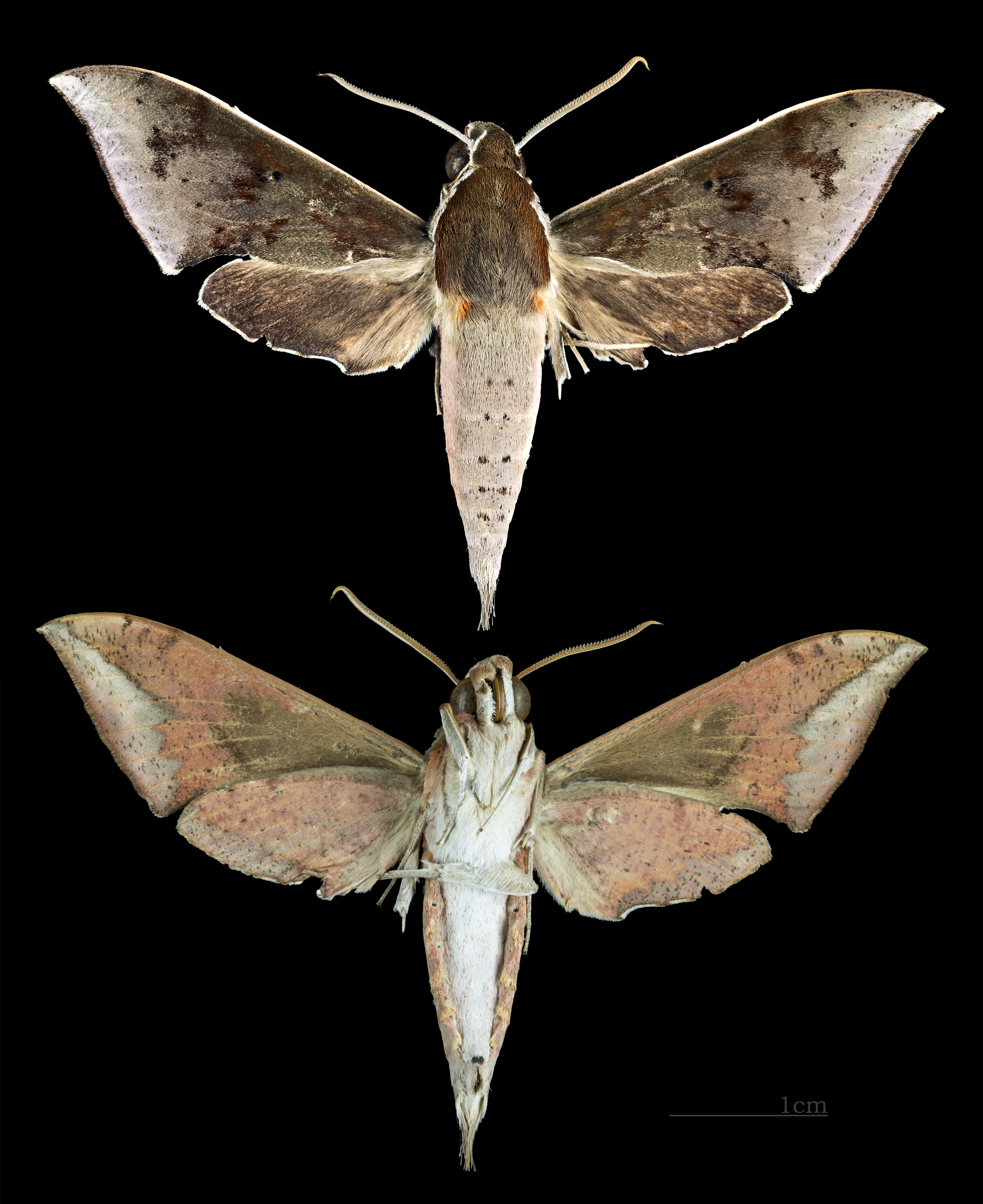
Rhagastis rubetra

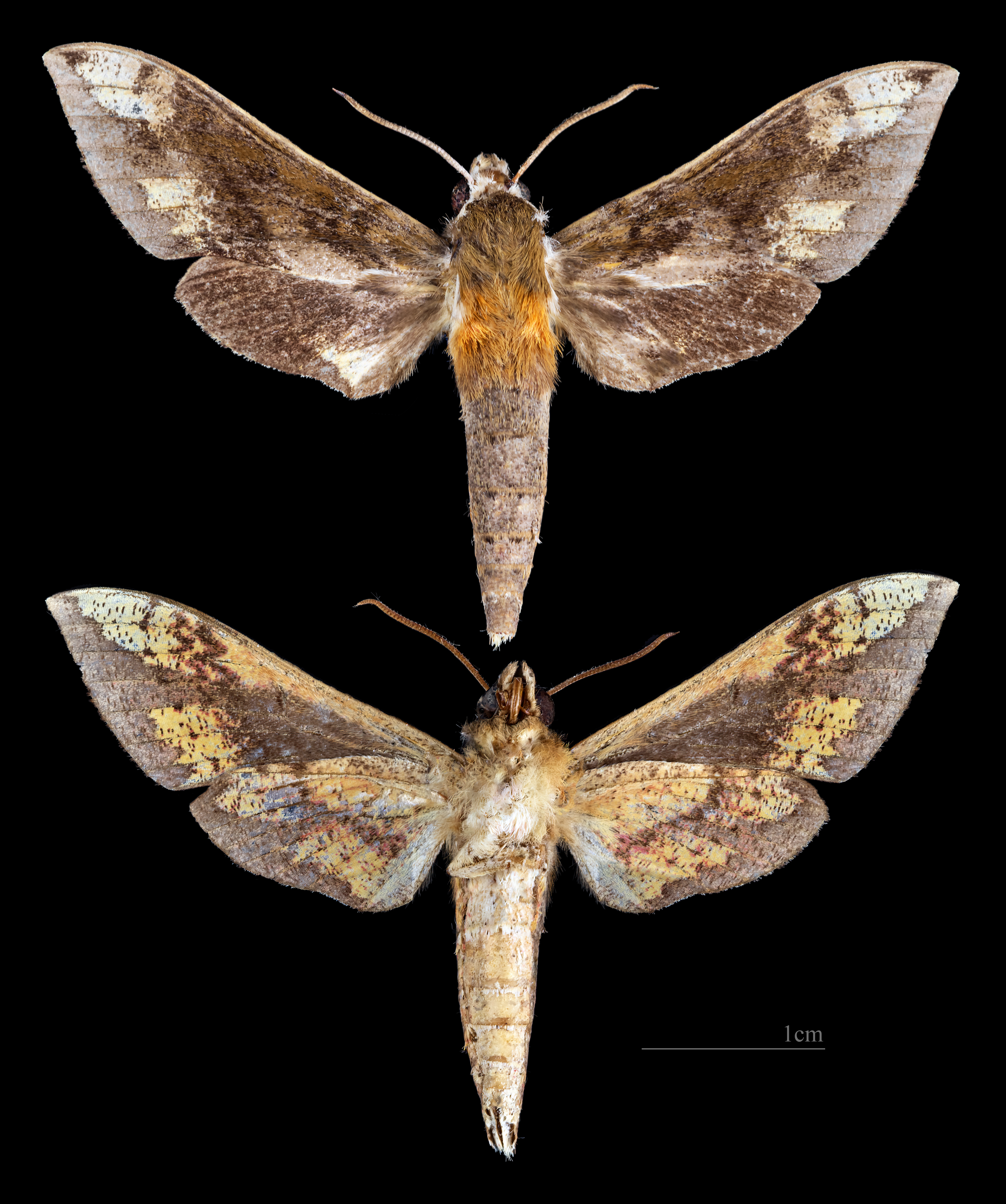
Rhagastis trilineata

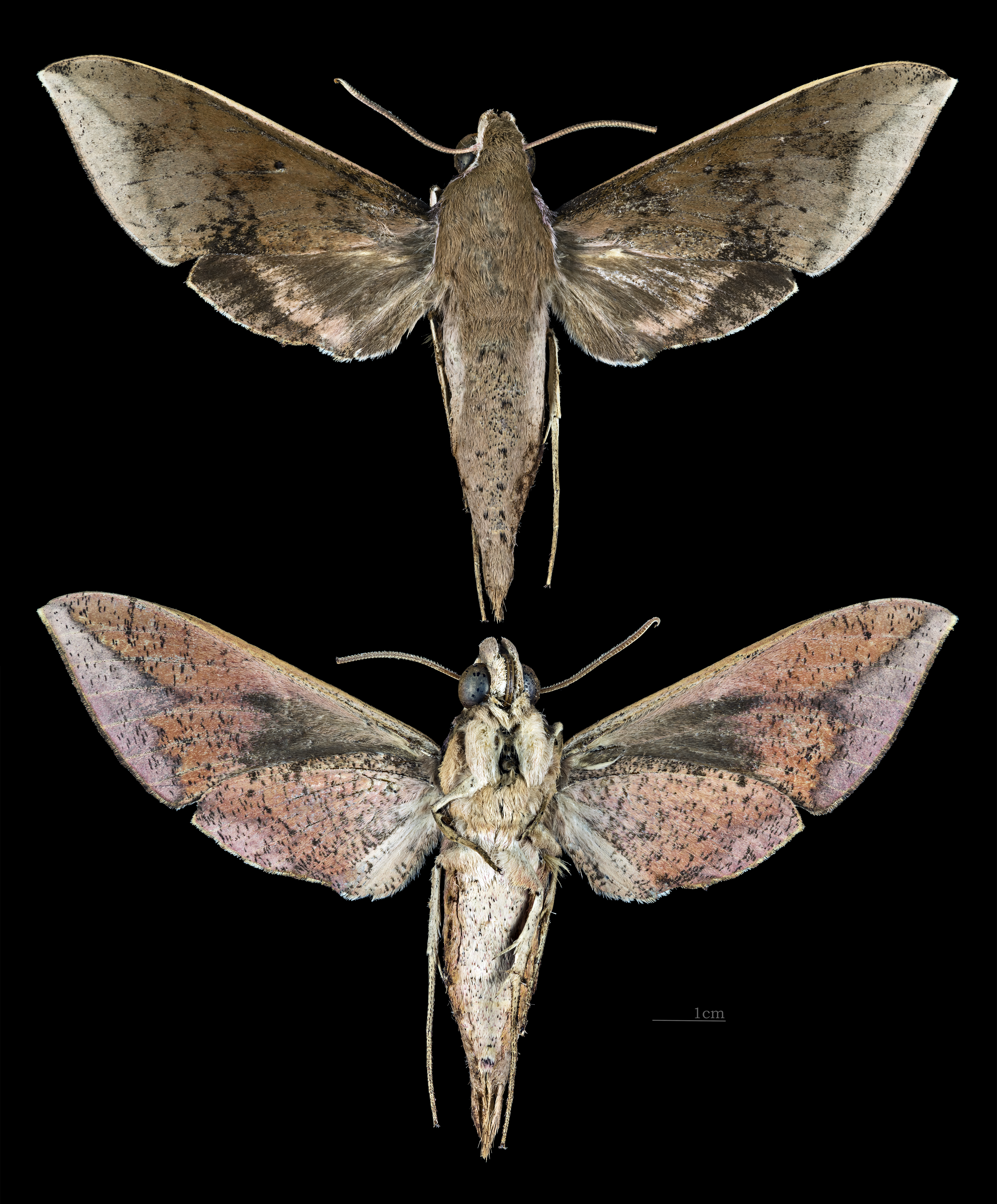
Rhagastis velata
