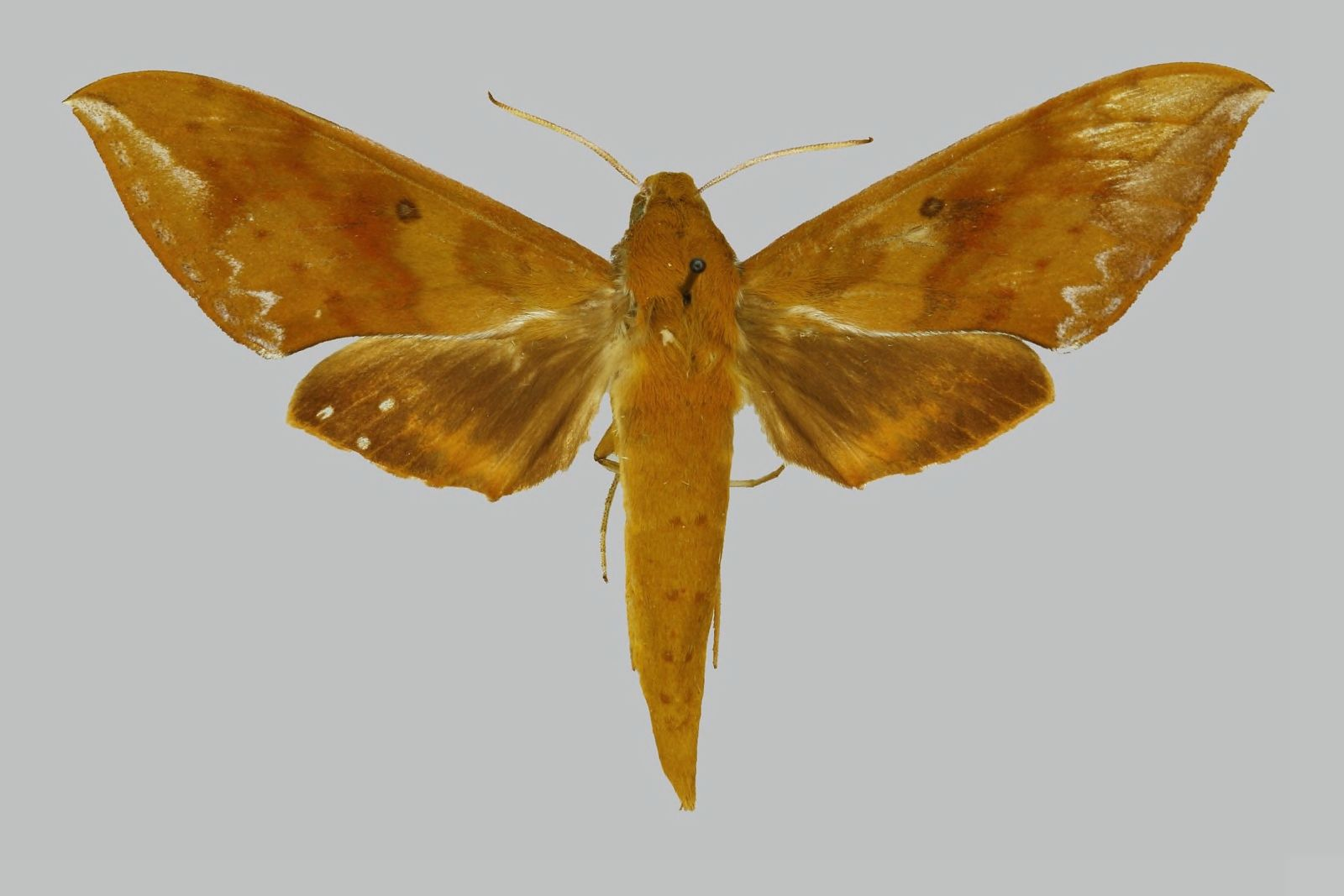

Scientific classification
- Kingdom: Animalia
- Phylum: Arthropoda
- Class: Insecta
- Order: Lepidoptera
- Family: Sphingidae
- Genus: Rhagastis
- Species: R. olivacea

Binomial name
- Rhagastis olivacea (Moore, 1872)

Synonyms
- Pergesa olivacea Moore, 1872

= Rhagastis olivacea =

Species of moth

Rhagastis olivacea, the olive mottled hawkmoth, is a moth of the family Sphingidae.

== Distribution ==
It is found from north-western India across Nepal, northern Myanmar, northern Thailand and southern China to northern Vietnam.

== Description ==
The wingspan is 72–92 mm. It can be distinguished from all other Rhagastis species by the yellowish-green ground colour of the forewing upperside with narrow and indistinct reddish transverse lines and bands, and a shuttle-shaped marginal area bordered irregularly with bluish-white scales, most strongly at the apex and tornus.

Adults are lachryphagous (meaning they drink tears).

Larvae have been recorded feeding on Impatiens species in India.
