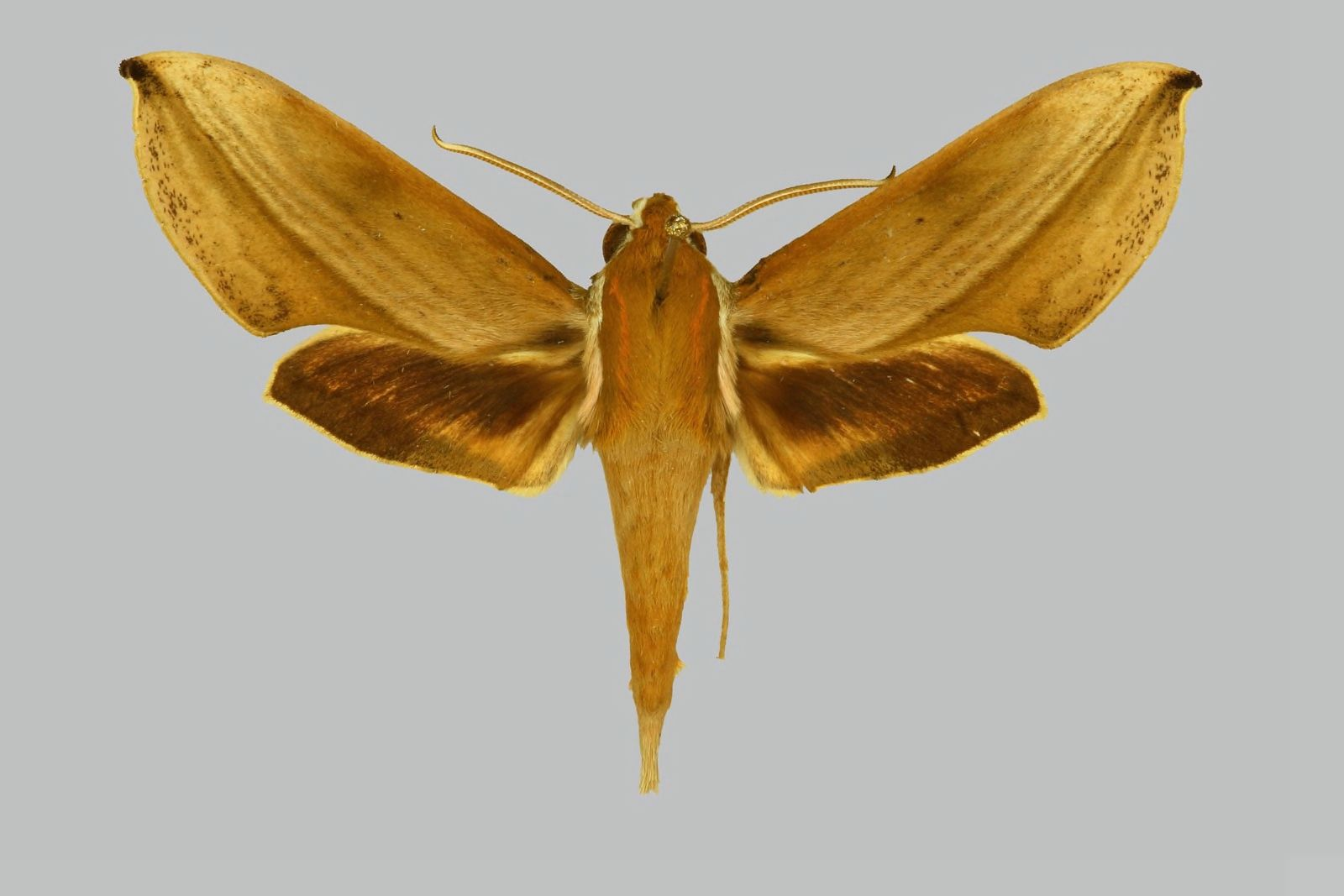

Scientific classification
- Kingdom: Animalia
- Phylum: Arthropoda
- Class: Insecta
- Order: Lepidoptera
- Family: Sphingidae
- Genus: Rhagastis
- Species: R. lambertoni

Binomial name
- Rhagastis lambertoni (Clark, 1923)

Synonyms
- Hippotion lambertoni Clark, 1923

= Rhagastis lambertoni =

Species of moth

Rhagastis lambertoni is a moth of the family Sphingidae. It is known from Madagascar.

The length of the forewings is 22–30 mm. It can be distinguished from all other Rhagastis species by the strongly convex outer margin and markedly falcate apex of the forewing.
