= Rhagastis meridionalis =

Scientific classification
- Kingdom: Animalia
- Phylum: Arthropoda
- Class: Insecta
- Order: Lepidoptera
- Family: Sphingidae
- Genus: Rhagastis
- Species: R. meridionalis

Binomial name
- Rhagastis meridionalis Gehlen, 1928

Synonyms
- Rhagastis acuta meridionalis Gehlen, 1928

Species of moth

Rhagastis meridionalis is a moth of the family Sphingidae first described by Bruno Gehlen in 1928. It is known from Java.
