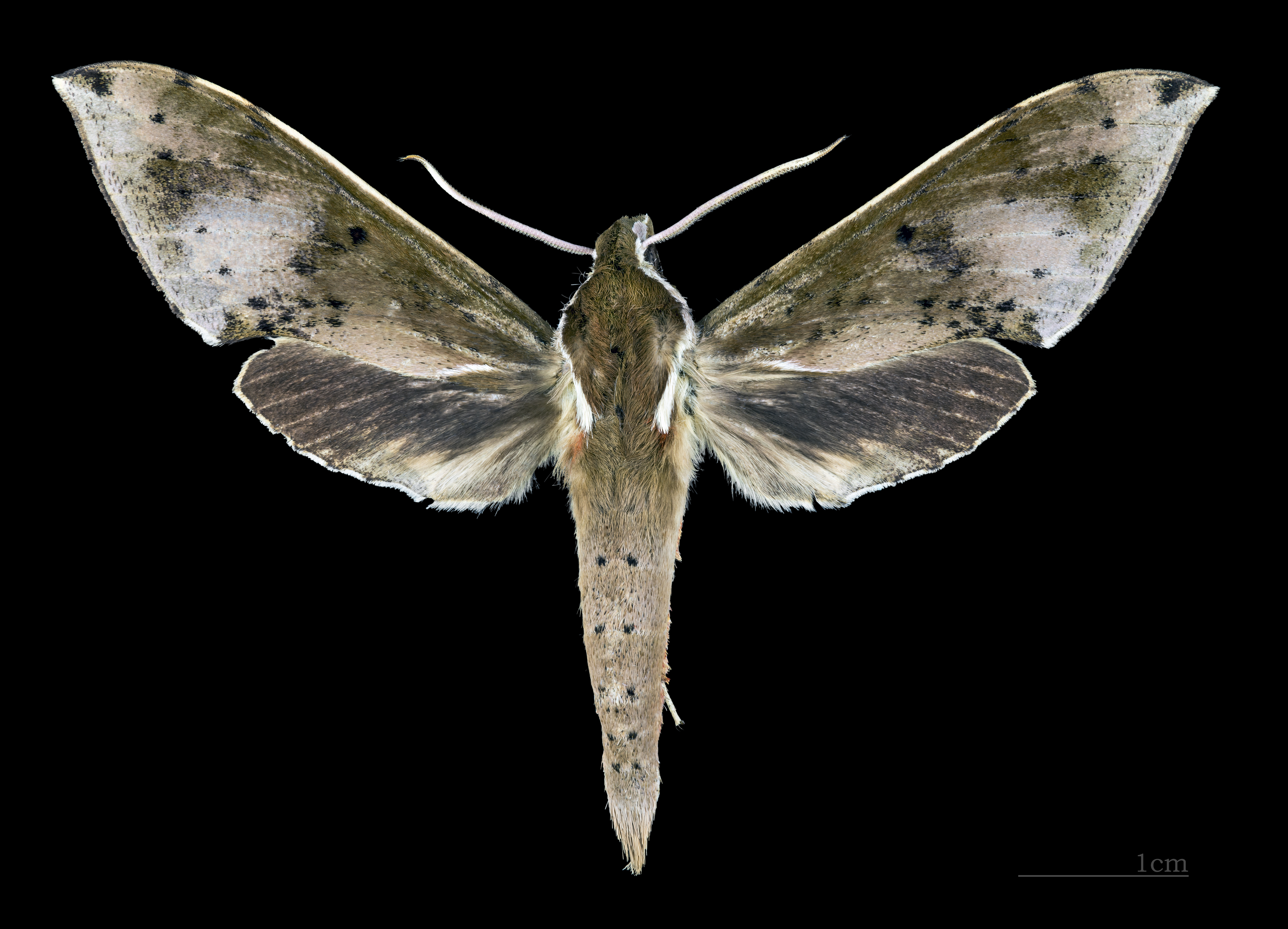
- R. a. albomarginatus, dorsal view
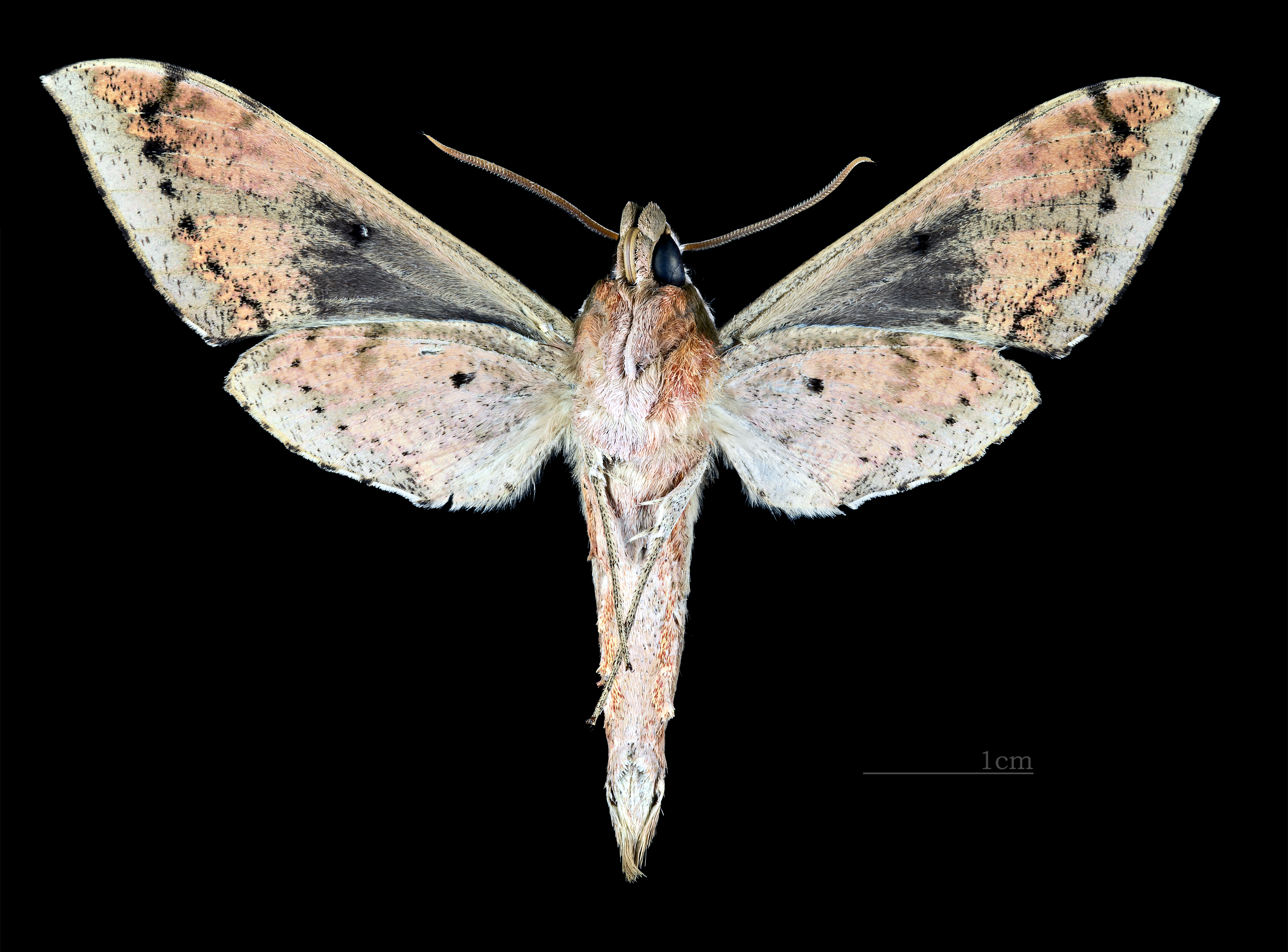
- R. a. albomarginatus, ventral view

Scientific classification
- Kingdom: Animalia
- Phylum: Arthropoda
- Class: Insecta
- Order: Lepidoptera
- Family: Sphingidae
- Genus: Rhagastis
- Species: R. albomarginatus

Binomial name
- Rhagastis albomarginatus (Rothschild, 1894)

Synonyms
- Metopsilus albomarginatus Rothschild, 1894; Rhagastis joiceyi Clark, 1924; Rhagastis mongoliana centrosinaria Chu & Wang, 1980; Rhagastis albomarginatus nubilosa Bryk, 1944

= Rhagastis albomarginatus =

Species of moth

Rhagastis albomarginatus is a moth of the family Sphingidae.

== Distribution ==
It is known from the Himalaya, China, Taiwan, Myanmar, Sumatra, Java and Borneo. s weakly dentate with white with brown vein spots. The costal edge is at least partly creamy white. The hindwing underside has a small black discal spot.

== Biology ==
Larvae of subspecies R. a. dichroae have been recorded feeding on Vernicia montana and Dichroa febrifuga, while the larvae of subspecies R. a. albomarginatus feed on Dichroa, Hydrangea and Vitis species.

== Subspecies ==
- Rhagastis albomarginatus albomarginatus (Himalaya, Taiwan, Myanmar)
- Rhagastis albomarginatus dichroae Mell, 1922 (China)
- Rhagastis albomarginatus everetti Rothschild & Jordan, 1903 (Indonesia, including Borneo and Sumatra)
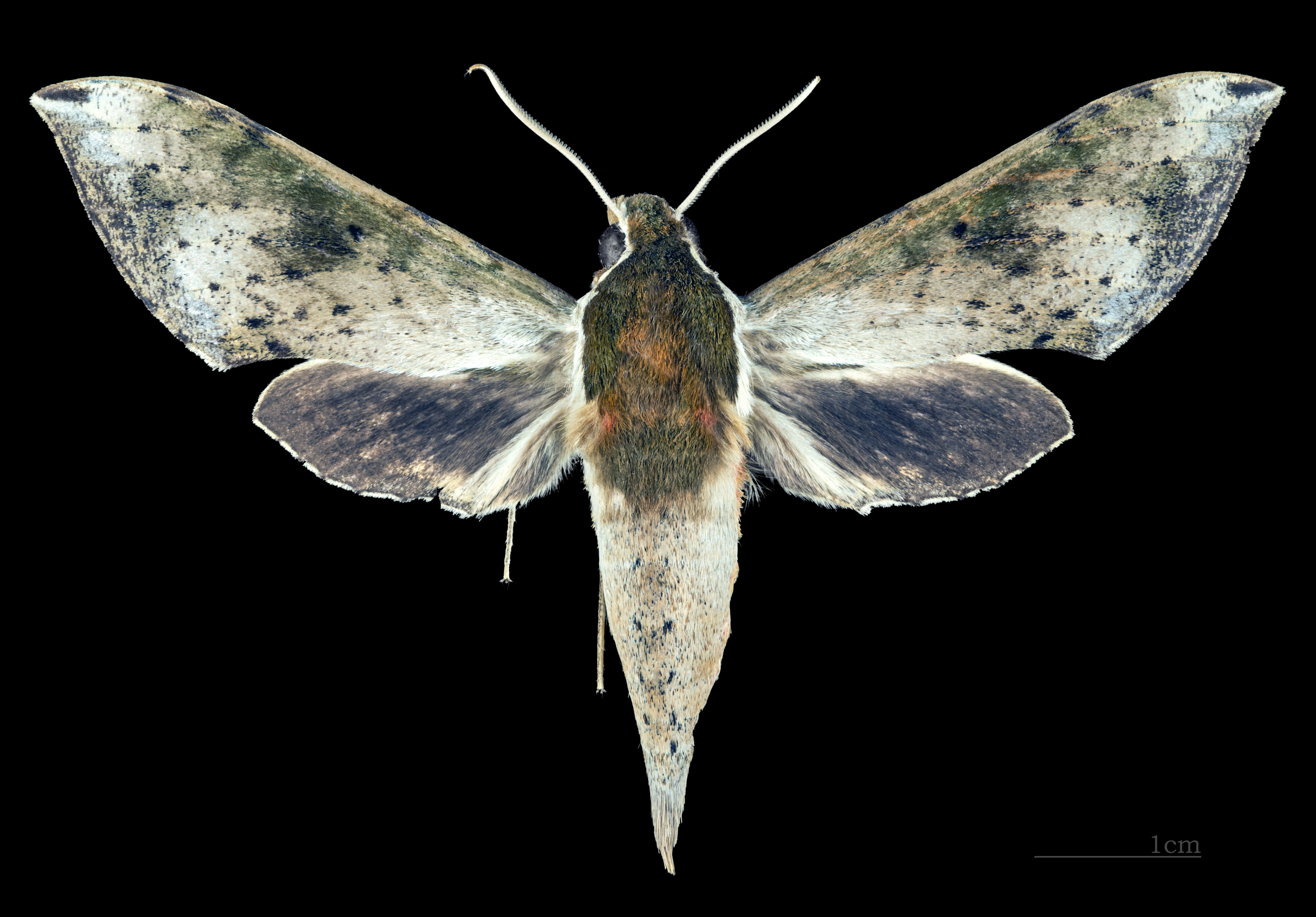
R. a. everetti, dorsal view

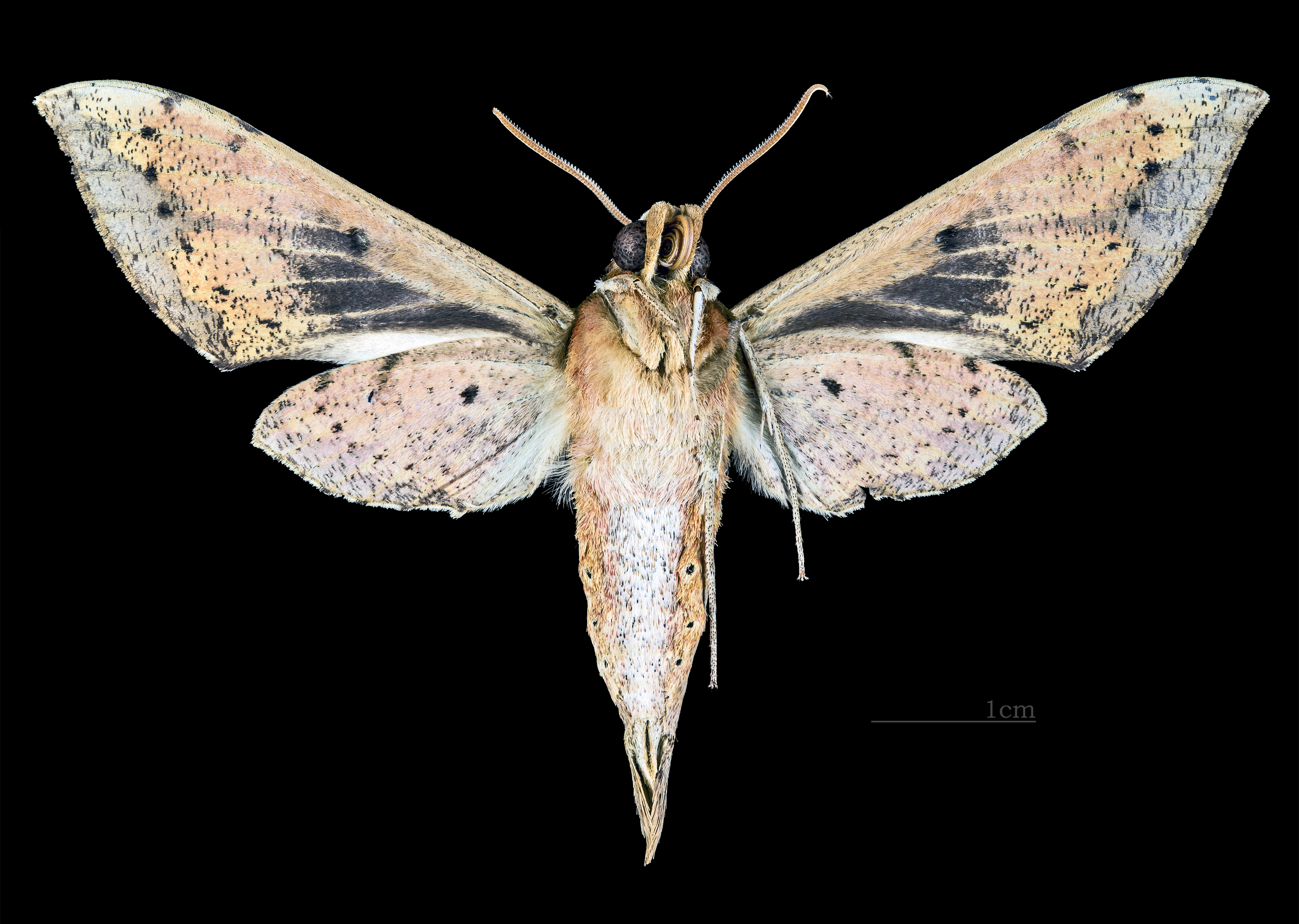
R. a. everetti, ventral view
