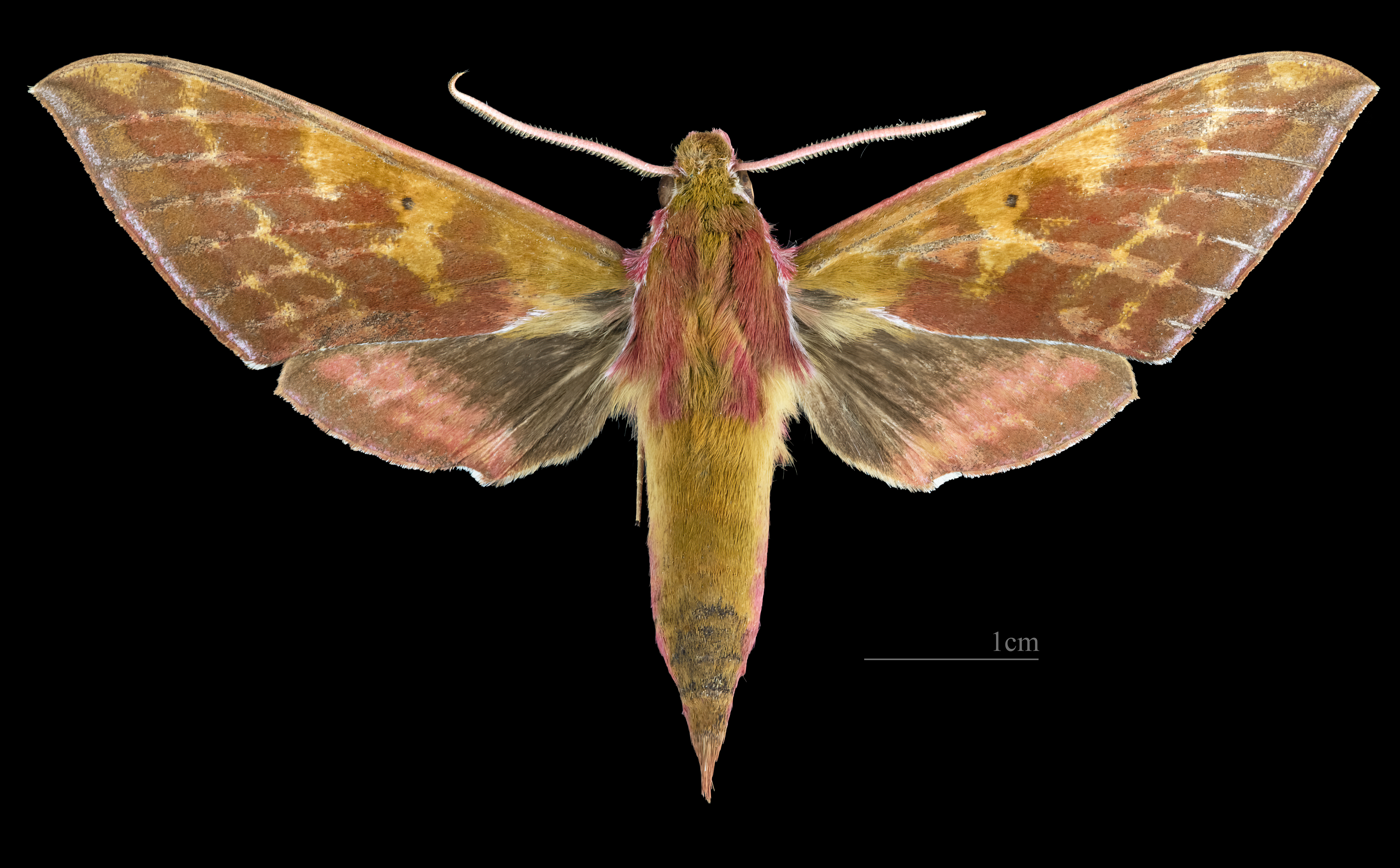
- Rhagastis gloriosa ♂
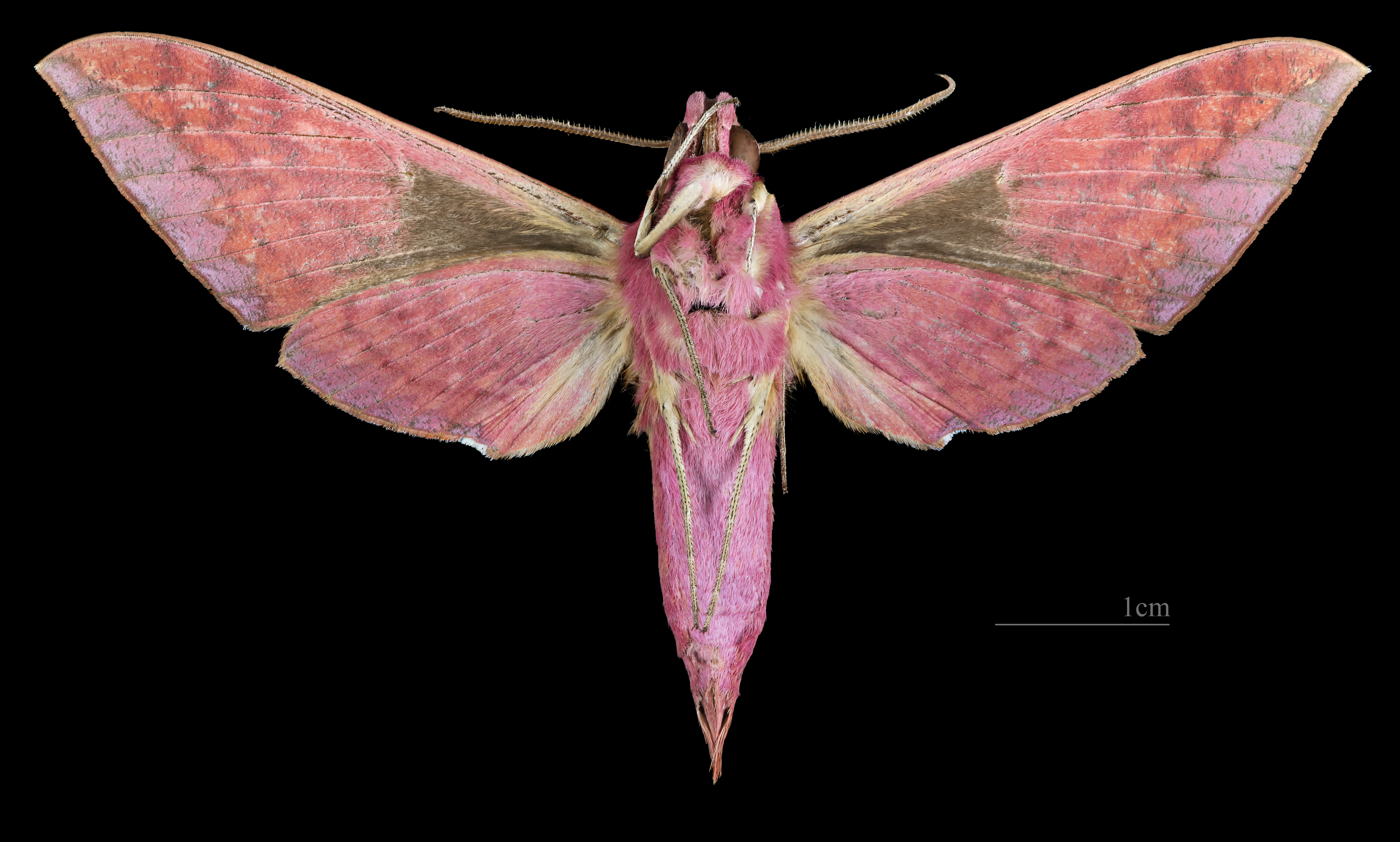
- Rhagastis gloriosa ♂ △

Scientific classification
- Kingdom: Animalia
- Phylum: Arthropoda
- Class: Insecta
- Order: Lepidoptera
- Family: Sphingidae
- Genus: Rhagastis
- Species: R. gloriosa

Binomial name
- Rhagastis gloriosa (Butler, 1875)

Synonyms
- Pergesa gloriosa Butler, 1875; Rhagastis yunnanaria Chu & Wang, 1980; Rhagastis gloriosa orientalis Bryk, 1944

= Rhagastis gloriosa =

Species of moth

Rhagastis gloriosa, the crimson mottled hawkmoth, is a moth of the family Sphingidae.

== Distribution ==
It is found along the southern slopes of the Himalaya in Nepal, Tibet, Bhutan, north-eastern India and northern Myanmar, east to central Yunnan in China. It has also been recorded from the extreme northwest of Thailand and northern Vietnam.

== Description ==
The wingspan is 82–92 mm. It has olive-green forewings overlain by broad, dark red and partially merged transverse bands. The dorsal scaling of the antenna is brown or black from near the base to near the hook. The forewing upperside ground colour is olive green. The transverse bands are dark red, broad, irregular and partially merged. The forewing and hindwing underside ground colour is bright pink and the hindwing upperside has a median band flushed with pink.
