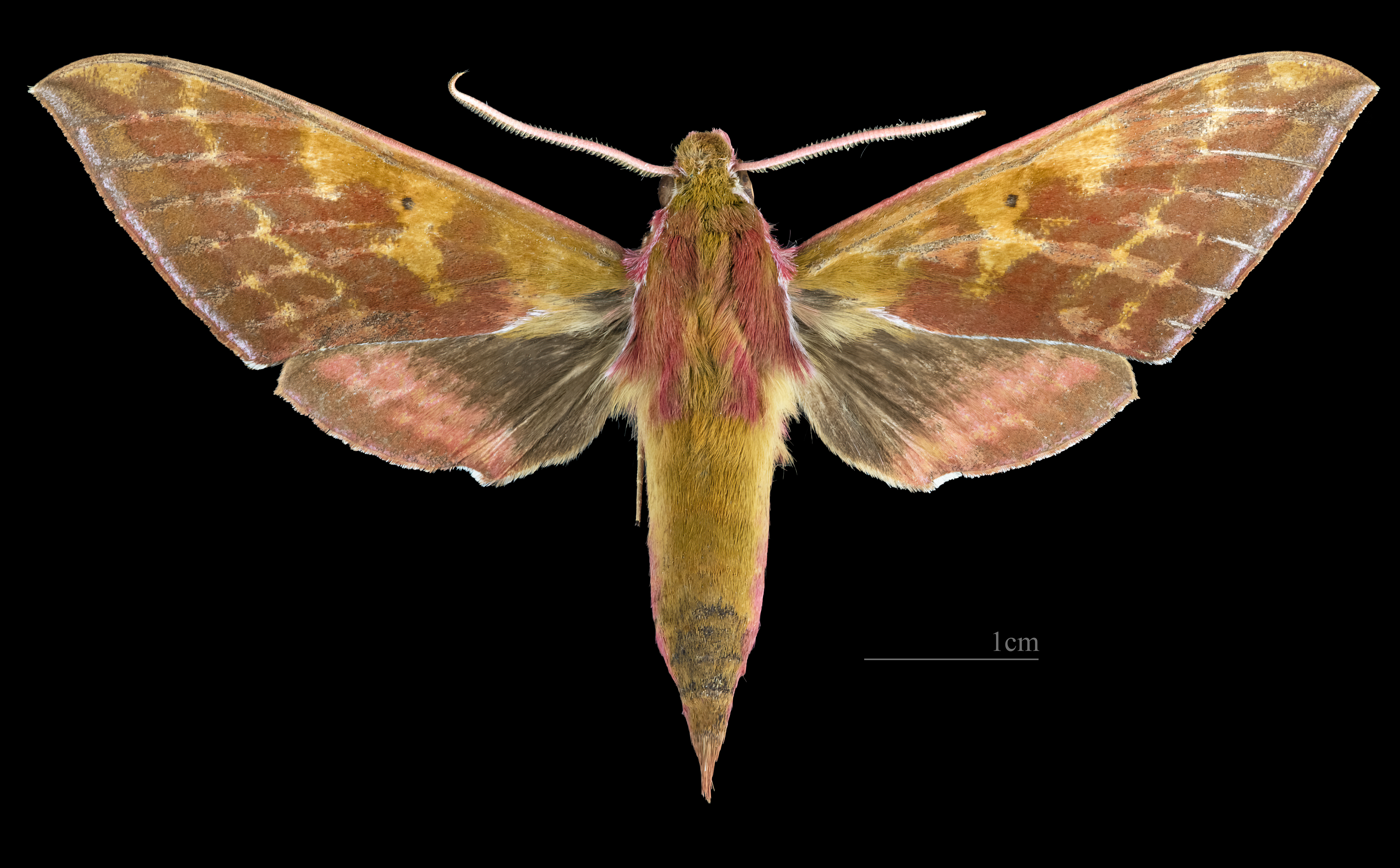

Scientific classification
- Kingdom: Animalia
- Phylum: Arthropoda
- Class: Insecta
- Order: Lepidoptera
- Family: Sphingidae
- Genus: Rhagastis
- Species: R. hayesi

Binomial name
- Rhagastis hayesi Diehl, 1982

= Rhagastis hayesi =

Species of moth

Rhagastis hayesi is a moth of the family Sphingidae. It is known from south-east Asia, including Burma, Vietnam and Thailand.
