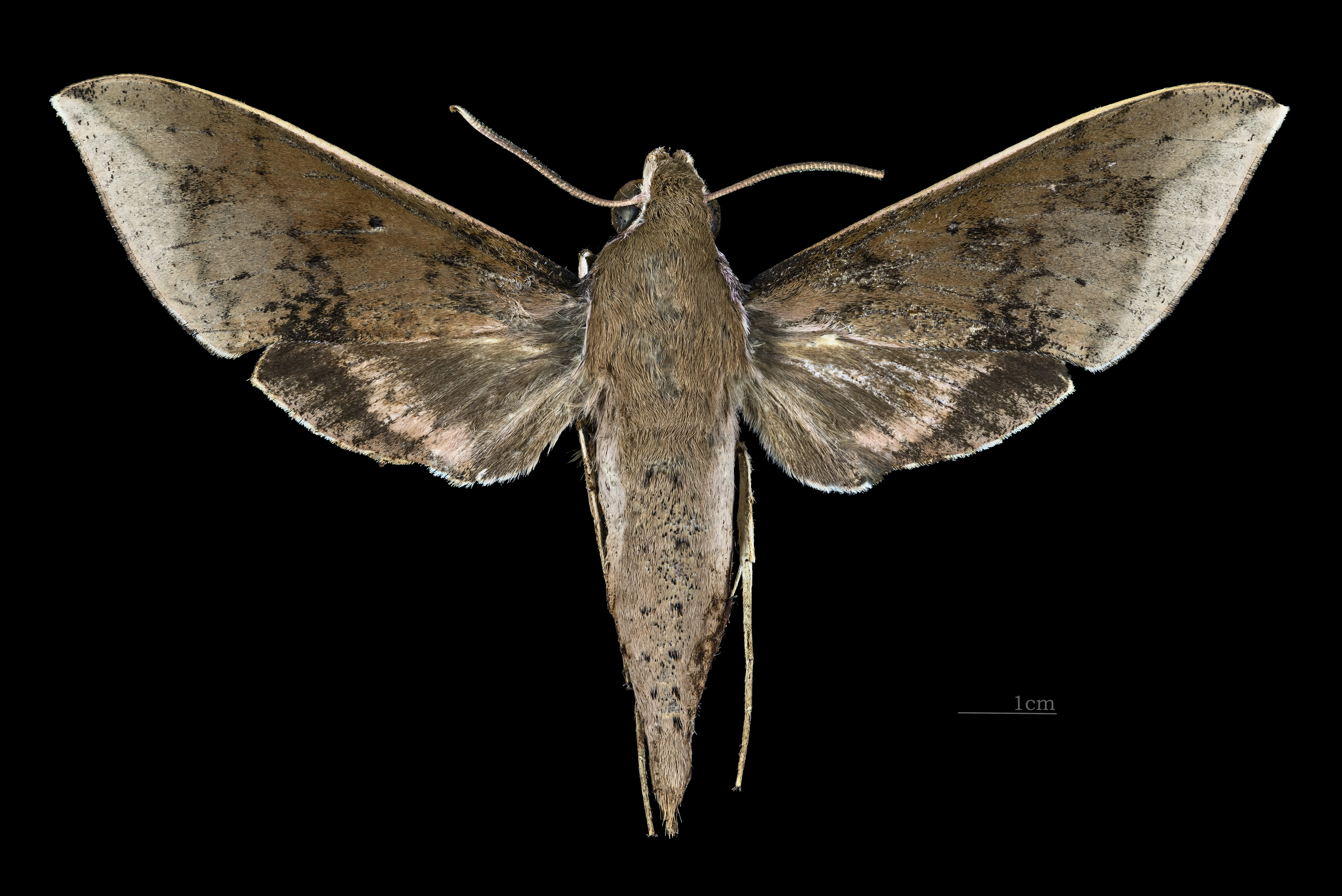
- Male dorsal
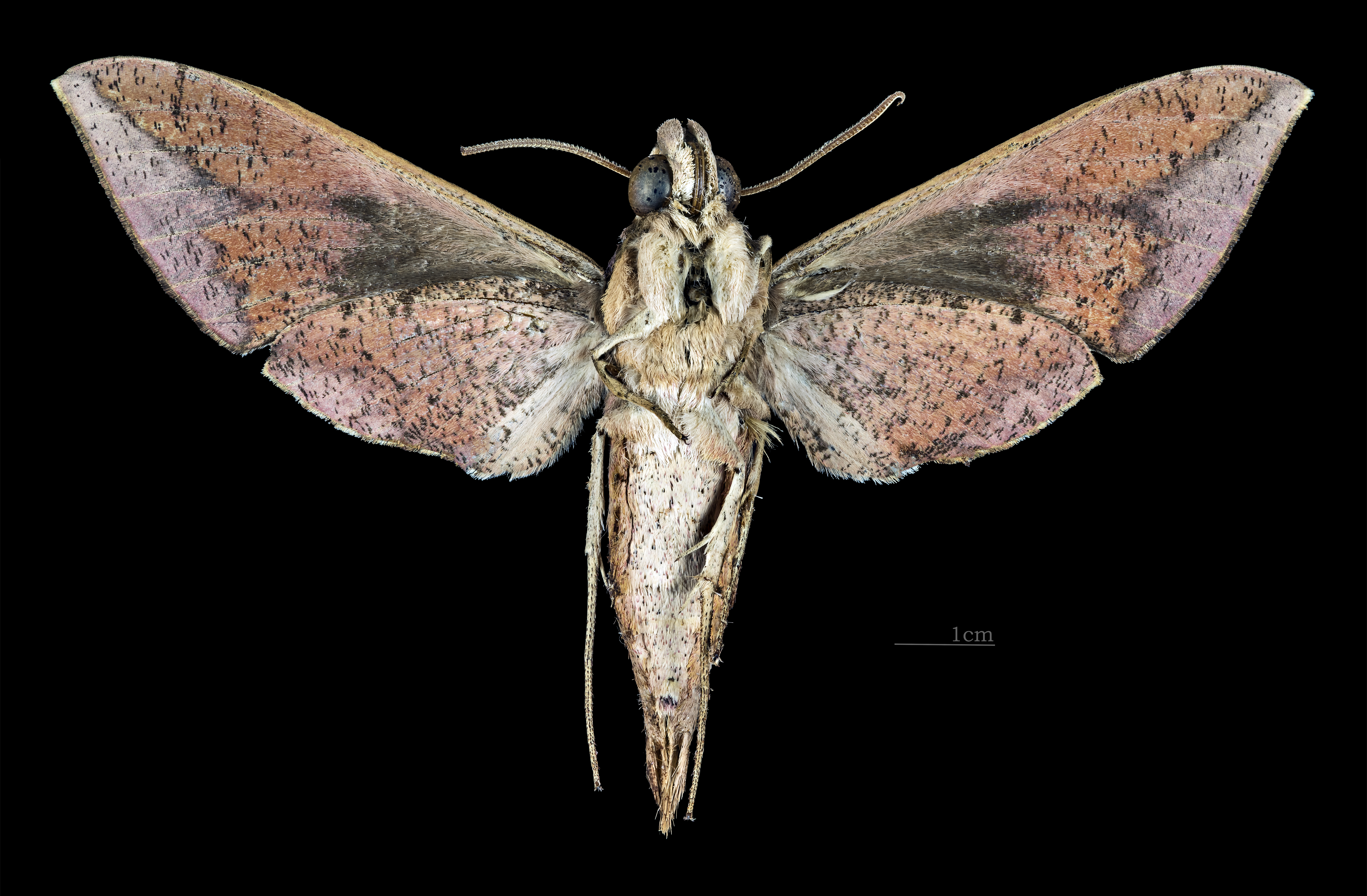
- Male ventral

Scientific classification
- Kingdom: Animalia
- Phylum: Arthropoda
- Class: Insecta
- Order: Lepidoptera
- Family: Sphingidae
- Genus: Rhagastis
- Species: R. velata

Binomial name
- Rhagastis velata (Walker, 1866)

Synonyms
- Pergesa velata Walker, 1866

= Rhagastis velata =

Species of moth

Rhagastis velata, the veiled mottled hawkmoth, is a moth of the family Sphingidae. It is known from Nepal, north-eastern India, Thailand, central and southern China and Taiwan.

The wingspan is 66–74 mm. The upperside of the abdomen is without a pair of lateral golden stripes or (occasionally) with vestigial stripes on the posterior segments. The forewing upperside has four postmedian lines forming a conspicuous dark patch on the inner margin that is often continued towards the costa where it joins another (not always well-marked) patch near the discal spot. Two or three of the postmedian lines are usually strongly dentate. The forewing underside has a brown border.

Larvae have been recorded feeding on Arisaema and Amorphophallus species in India.
