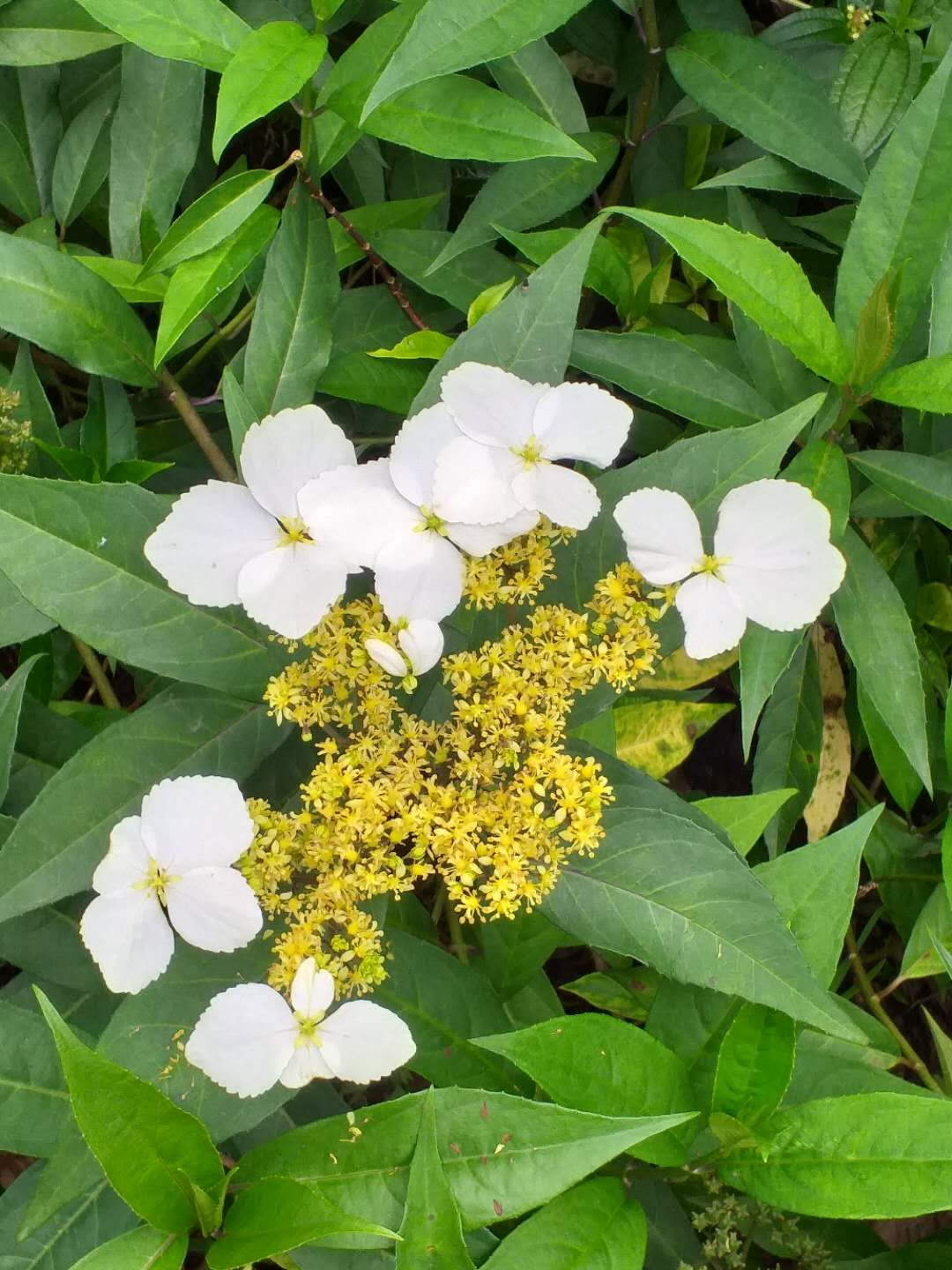

Scientific classification
- Kingdom: Plantae
- Clade: Tracheophytes
- Clade: Angiosperms
- Clade: Eudicots
- Clade: Asterids
- Order: Cornales
- Family: Hydrangeaceae
- Genus: Hydrangea
- Species: H. pottingeri

Binomial name
- Hydrangea pottingeri Prain

Synonyms
- List: Hortensia chinensis (E.M.McClint.) H.Ohba & S.Akiyama; Hydrangea angustipetala Hayata; Hydrangea angustipetala var. major W.T.Wang & M.X.Nie; Hydrangea chinensis Maxim.; Hydrangea chinensis var. chinensis; Hydrangea chinensis var. patentihirsuta Z.H.Chen, W.Y.Xie & Xian X.Chen; Hydrangea chloroleuca Diels; Hydrangea formosana Koidz.; Hydrangea glabrifolia Hayata; Hydrangea jiangxiensis W.T.Wang & M.X.Nie; Hydrangea macrosepala Hayata; Hydrangea obovatifolia Hayata; Hydrangea pubiramea Merr.; Hydrangea pubiramea var. parvifolia Merr.; Hydrangea scandens var. chinensis E.M.McClint.; Hydrangea stenophylla Merr. & Chun; Hydrangea subferruginca W.W.Sm.; Hydrangea umbellata Rehder; Hydrangea umbellata f. sterilis C.C.Yang

= Hydrangea pottingeri =

Species of flowering plant

Hydrangea pottingeri (synonym Hydrangea chinensis) is a species of flowering plant in the family Hydrangeaceae. It is a shrub native to eastern India (Arunachal Pradesh), Myanmar, southeastern China (Anhui, Fujian, Guangxi, Hunan, Jiangxi, and Zhejiang), and Taiwan. It grows in sparse to dense temperate and subtropical forests in valleys and on mountain tops and slopes from 300 to 2,000 metres (980 to 6,560 ft) elevation.
