= List of taxa named by anagrams =

An animation illustrating the anagram between the Euphorbiaceae genus names Joannesia and Annesijoa

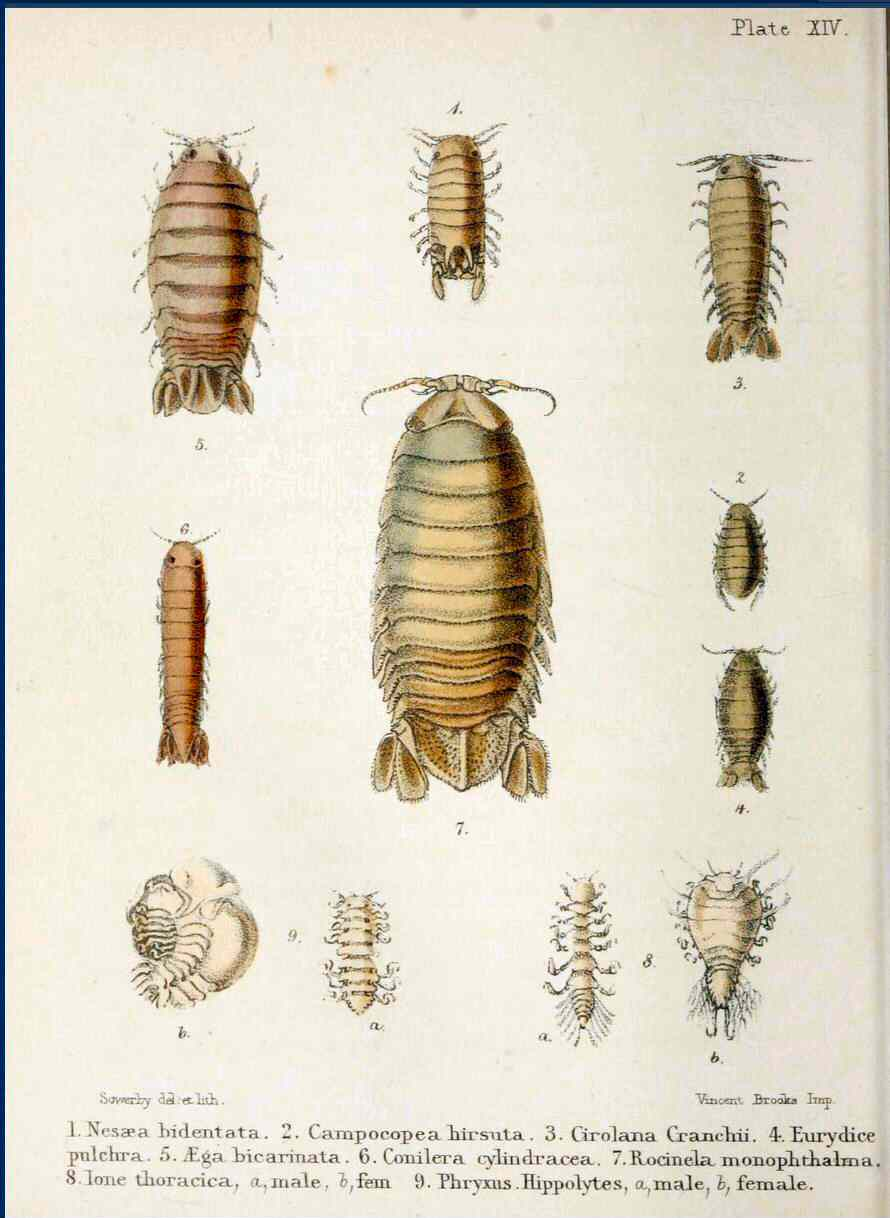
Illustration from Adam White's A Popular History of British Crustacea, 1857, showing the crustacean genera Conilera and Rocinela named by Leach using taxonomic anagrams

In the biological nomenclature codes, an anagram can be used to name a new taxon.

Wordplays are one source of inspiration allowing organisms to receive scientific names. In the binomial nomenclature, as scientists have latitude in naming genera and species, a taxon name can therefore be an anagram, provided it remains pronounceable. For example, in the International Code of Nomenclature for algae, fungi, and plants, a new generic name can be taken from the name of a person by using an anagram or abbreviation of it.

William Elford Leach was among the first naturalists to use taxonomic anagrams, and, in 1818, he described several isopod genera that were each other's anagrams of 'Caroline' : Conilera, Lironeca, Nerocila, Olencira, and Rocinela.

== List ==
Initial taxon name	Initial authority	Taxonomic anagram	Anagram authority	Etymology or namesake	Reference
Albizia	Durazz. 1772	Balizia	Barneby & J.W.Grimes 1996	Filippo degli Albizzi (1724 - 1789)	
Alciope	DC. 1836	Capelio (Note: The two genus names are synonyms.)	B.Nord. 2002	Alciope, a nymph	
Alibertia	A.Rich. ex DC. 1830	Ibetralia	Bremek. 1934	Jean-Louis-Marc Alibert (1768 - 1837)	
Allium	L. 1753	Muilla (Note: It is also an anadrome (reverse spelling).)	S.Watson ex Benth. 1833	Latin word for garlic	
Alsomitra	(Blume) M.Roem., 1846	Siolmatra	Baill., 1885	—	
Baldellia	Parl. 1854	Albidella	Pichon 1946	Bartolomeo Bartolini-Baldelli (1804 - 1868)	
Bartsia	L. 1753	Starbia	Thouars 1806	Johann Bartsch (1709 - 1738)	
Beilschmiedia	Nees 1831	Bielschmeidia	Pancher & Sebert 1874	Carl Traugott Beilschmied (1793 - 1848)	
Berardia	Brongn. 1826	Diberara	Baill. 1881	Jacques Étienne Bérard (1789 - 1869)	
Berteroa	DC. 1821	Terobera	Steud. 1855	Carlo Luigi Giuseppe Bertero (1789 - 1831)	
Bobea	A.Rich. 1830	Obbea	Hook.f. 1870	Jean-Baptiste Bobe-Moreau (1761 - 1849)	
Bouchea	Cham. 1832	Ubochea	Baill. 1891	Peter Friedrich Bouché (1785 - 1856)	
Bullockia	(Bridson) Razafim., Lantz & B.Bremer 2009	Buckollia	Venter & R.L.Verh. 1994	Arthur Allman Bullock (1906 - 1980)	
Burmannia	L. 1753	Maburnia (Note: This anagram is imperfect.)	Thouars 1806	Johannes Burman (1706 - 1779)	
Danthonia	DC. 1805	Thonandia	H.P.Linder 1996	Étienne Danthoine (1739 - 1794)	
Ekmania	Gleason 1919	Manekia	Trel. 1927	Erik Leonard Ekman (1883 - 1931)	
Fuchsia	Plum. ex L.	Schufia	Spach	Leonhart Fuchs (1501–1566)	
Gerardia	L. 1753	Dargeria	Decne. 1844	John Gerard (1545 - 1612)	
Gerardia	L. 1753	Graderia	Benth. 1846	John Gerard (1545 - 1612)	
Goldfussia	Nees 1832	Diflugossa	Bremek. 1944	Georg August Goldfuss (1782 - 1848)	
Grazielia	R.M.King & H.Rob. 1972	Algrizea	Proença & NicLugh. 2006	Graziela Maciel Barroso (1912 - 2003)	
Hariota	DC. 1834	Hatiora	Britton & Rose 1915	Thomas Harriot (ca. 1560 - 1621)	
Hermannia	L. 1753	Mahernia	L. 1767	Paul Hermann (1646 - 1695)	
Hottonia	L. 1753	Honottia	Rchb. 1828	Pieter Hotton (1648 - 1709)	
Huberia	DC. 1828	Behuria	Cham. 1834	François Huber (1750 - 1831)	
Joannesia	Vell. 1798	Annesijoa	Pax & K.Hoffm. 1919	John VI of Portugal (1767 - 1826)	
Kailarsenia	Tirveng. 1983	Larsenaikia	Tirveng. 1993	Kai Larsen (1926 - 2012)	
Lawrencia	Hook. 1840	Wrenciala	A.Gray 1854	Robert William Lawrence (1807 - 1833)	
Lechlera	Griseb. 1857	Relchela	Steud. 1854	Willibald Lechler (1814 - 1856)	
Lespedeza	Michx. 1803	Despeleza	Nieuwl. 1914	Vicente Manuel de Céspedes (1721 ? - 1794)	
Letestua	Lecomte 1920	Tulestea	Aubrév. & Pellegr. 1961	Georges Le Testu (1877 - 1967)	
Lobelia	L. 1753	Bolelia	Raf. 1832	Matthias de l'Obel (1538 - 1616)	
Mikania	F.W.Schmidt 1795	Kanimia	Gardner 1847	Joseph Gottfried Mikan (1743 - 1814)	
Myginda	Jacq. 1760	Gyminda	Sarg. 1891	Franz von Mygind (1710 - 1789)	
Oedera	L. 1771	Eroeda	Levyns 1948	Georg Christian Oeder (1728 - 1791)	
Planogyra	Morse, 1864	Plagyrona	E. Gittenberger, 1977	Latin planus (flat) + gyra (circle) "flatwhorl"	
Siebera	C.Presl 1828	Beriesa	Steud. 1840	Franz Wilhelm Sieber (1789 - 1844)	
Smithia	Aiton 1789	Thismia	Griff 1845	Thomas Smith (ca. 1825)	
Tragia	L. 1753	Agirta	Baill. 1858	Hieronymus Bock, named Tragus (1498 - 1554)	

== Other names ==
While not a currently valid name, a scientific name was proposed for the Loch Ness Monster in a 1975 paper published in Nature by Sir Peter Scott & Robert Rines. The name, Nessiteras rhombopteryx, was later pointed out as being an anagram for "Monster hoax by Sir Peter S."
