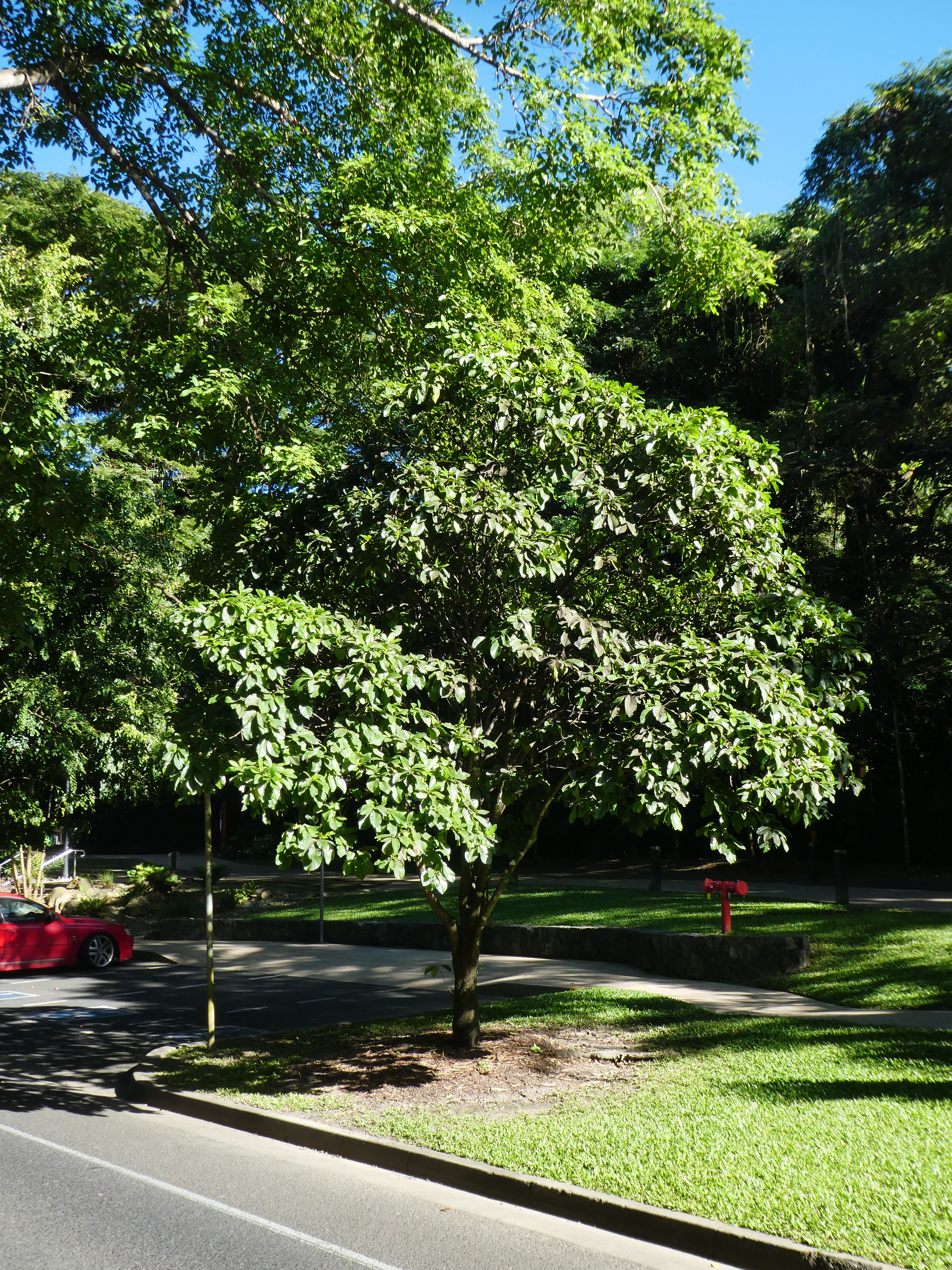
- In Collins Ave, Cairns, Queensland

Conservation status
- Least Concern (NCA)
- Least Concern (IUCN 3.1)

Scientific classification
- Kingdom: Plantae
- Clade: Tracheophytes
- Clade: Angiosperms
- Clade: Eudicots
- Clade: Asterids
- Order: Gentianales
- Family: Rubiaceae
- Genus: Larsenaikia
- Species: L. ochreata

Binomial name
- Larsenaikia ochreata (F.Muell.) Tirveng.

Synonyms
- Homotypic: Gardenia ochreata F.Muell.; Kailarsenia ochreata (F.Muell.) Puttock; Heterotypic: Gardenia kershawii F.M.Bailey; Gardenia macgillivraei Benth.

= Larsenaikia ochreata =

Wenlock gardenia

Species of flowering plant

Larsenaikia ochreata, commonly known as Wenlock gardenia, scented Gardenia bush or wild Gardenia, is a plant in the coffee family Rubiaceae endemic to Queensland, Australia.

== Description ==
Larsenaikia ochreata is a tree growing to about 15 (or occasionally 20) m tall. Stipules are up to 12 mm long, initially fused into a tube that encloses the leaf bud—they then split along one side as the bud grows. Leaves are variable in size and shape, but are mostly broadly elliptic and 8–25 cm long by 4–10 cm wide. They are usually arranged in whorls of three on the twigs but may be in opposite pairs, and they have 8–12 lateral veins—which are quite prominent—on either side of the midrib.

The inflorescences are terminal and consist of either single flowers, or cymes with 2–4 flowers. They are fragrant and are carried on pedicels up to 12 mm long. The green calyx tube is 5–8 mm long with narrow linear lobes up to 12 mm long. The white corolla tube may be 55 mm long and 3–5 mm diameter, with 5 or 6 lobes (petals) measuring up to 40 mm long and 13 mm wide. The flowers turn yellow as they age.

The fruit is a drupe, yellow/green when mature, ovoid to ellipsoid in shape, and up to 50 mm long by 35 mm wide. They are finely hairy on the outside, with the remains of the calyx lobes persisting at the apex. The rind is about 5 mm thick, within which is a cream-coloured placental mass containing numerous seeds about 3–6 mm long.

== Taxonomy ==
This species was first described as Gardenia ochreata in 1858 by the botanist Ferdinand von Mueller, based on material collected from the Burdekin River. In 1989 the Australian botanist Christopher Francis Puttock transferred it to the genus Kailarsenia, however shortly thereafter the Sri Lankan botanist and Rubiaceae specialist erected a new genus, Larsenaikia, to accommodate this plant.

Two other botanists also described specimens of this plant, giving them names that are now recognised as synonyms of this taxon, i.e. G. macgillivraei (George Bentham, 1867) and G. kershawii (Frederick Manson Bailey, 1914).

=== Etymology ===
The genus name Larsenaikia is an anagram of Kailarsenia, which in turn was created by Tirvengadum to honour the Danish botanist Kai Larsen. The species epithet ochreata is derived from the Latin ocrea, (sheath), referring to the stipules that fully enclose the leaf buds.

== Distribution and habitat ==
Larsenaikia ochreata is widespread in eastern Queensland, and has been observed from the tip of Cape York Peninsula southwards to Central Queensland. It grows in open forest and drier rainforest types such as monsoon forest and vine thickets, at altitudes from sea level to about 400 m.

== Conservation ==
This species is listed as least concern under the Queensland Government's Nature Conservation Act, and also by the International Union for Conservation of Nature (IUCN).

== Gallery ==
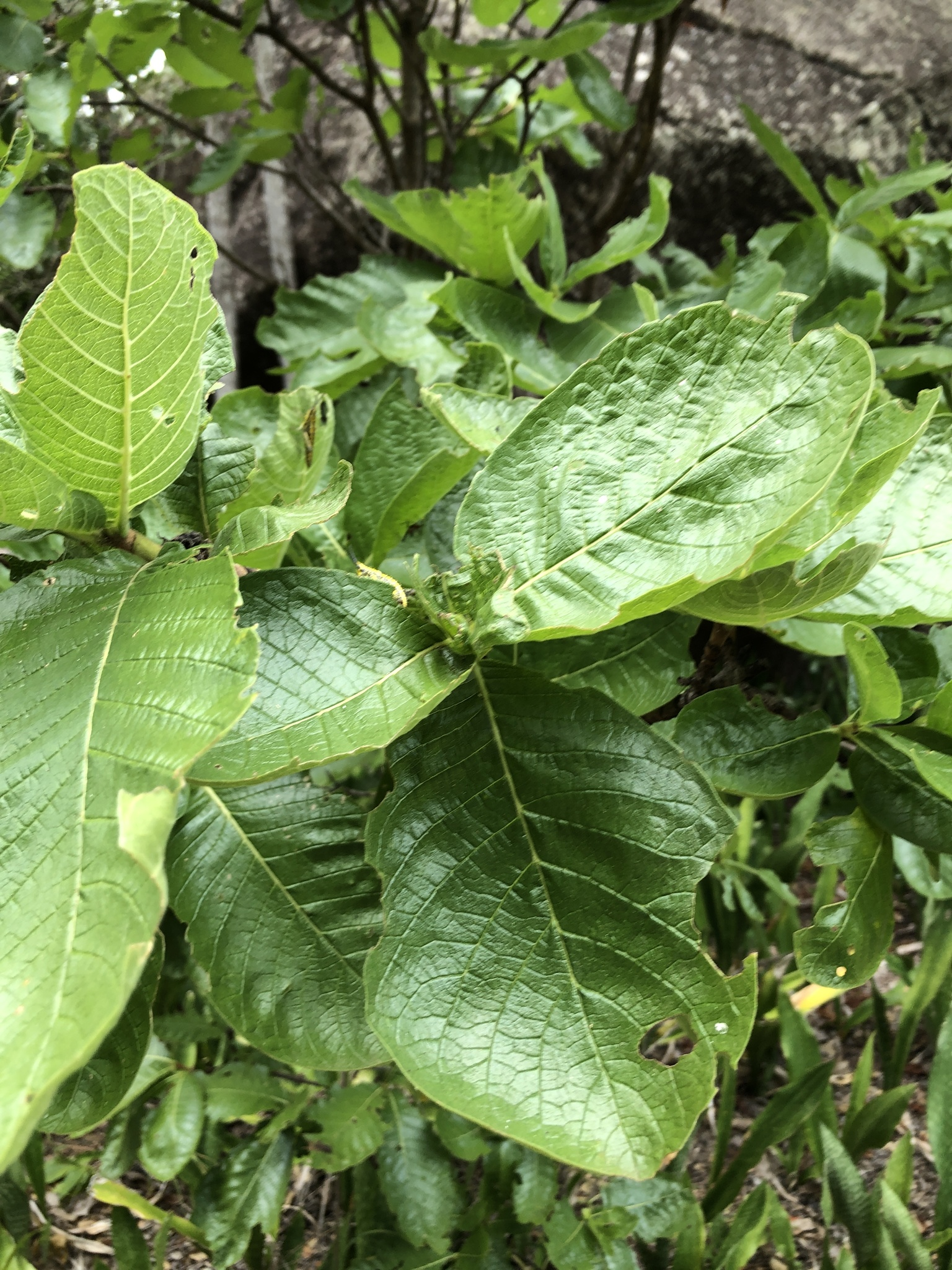
Foliage

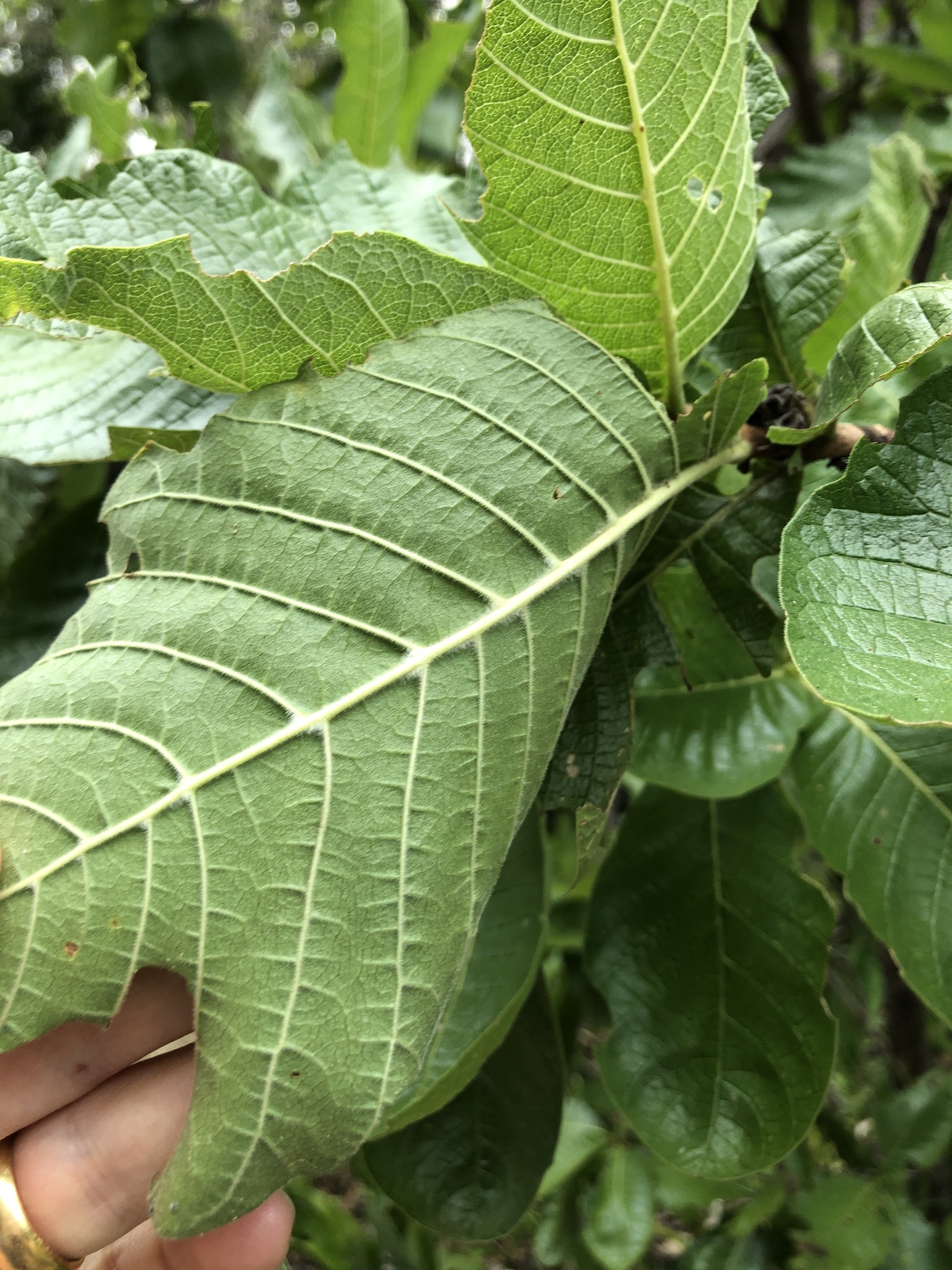
Underside of leaf

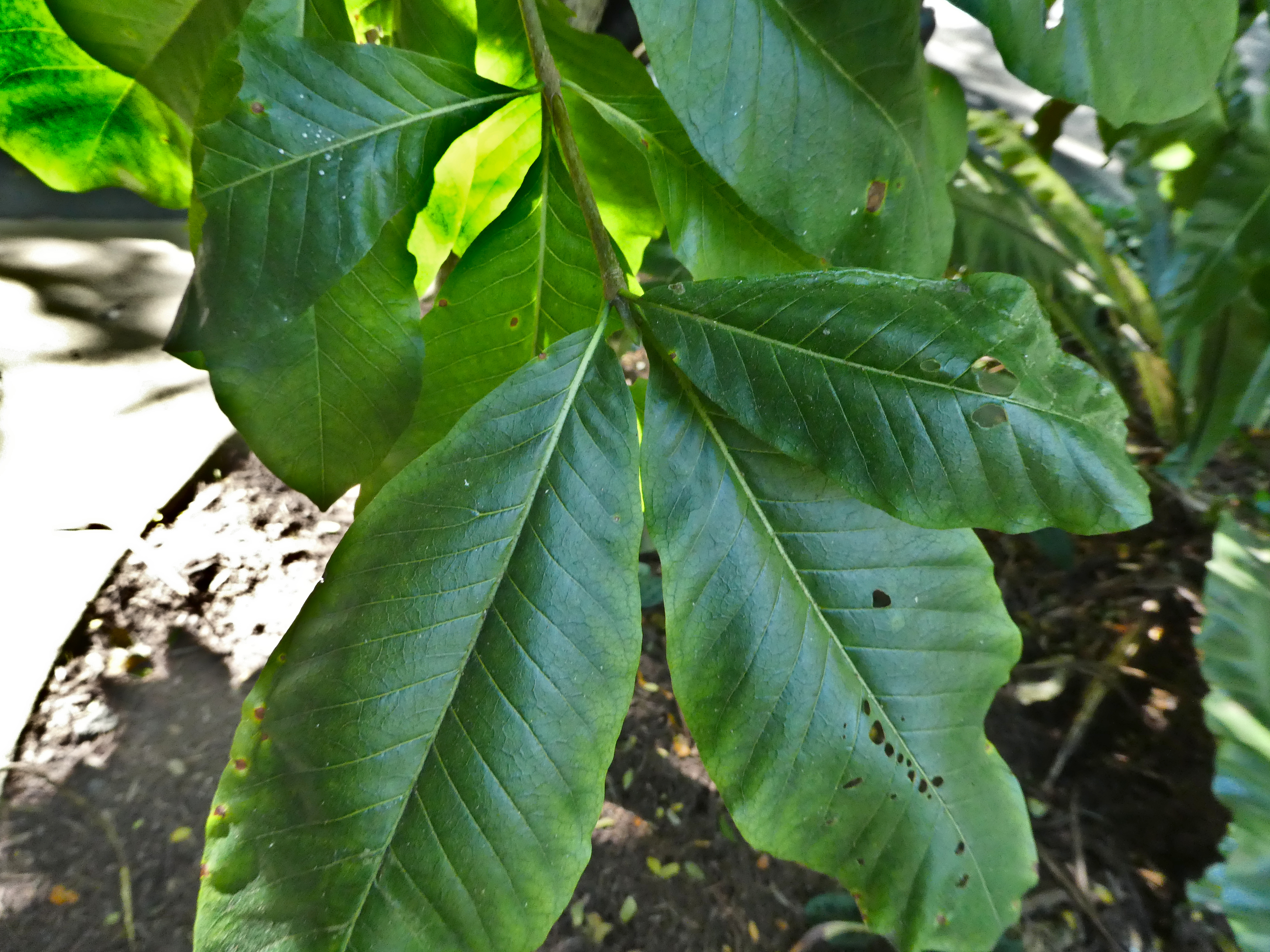
Leaves in whorls of three

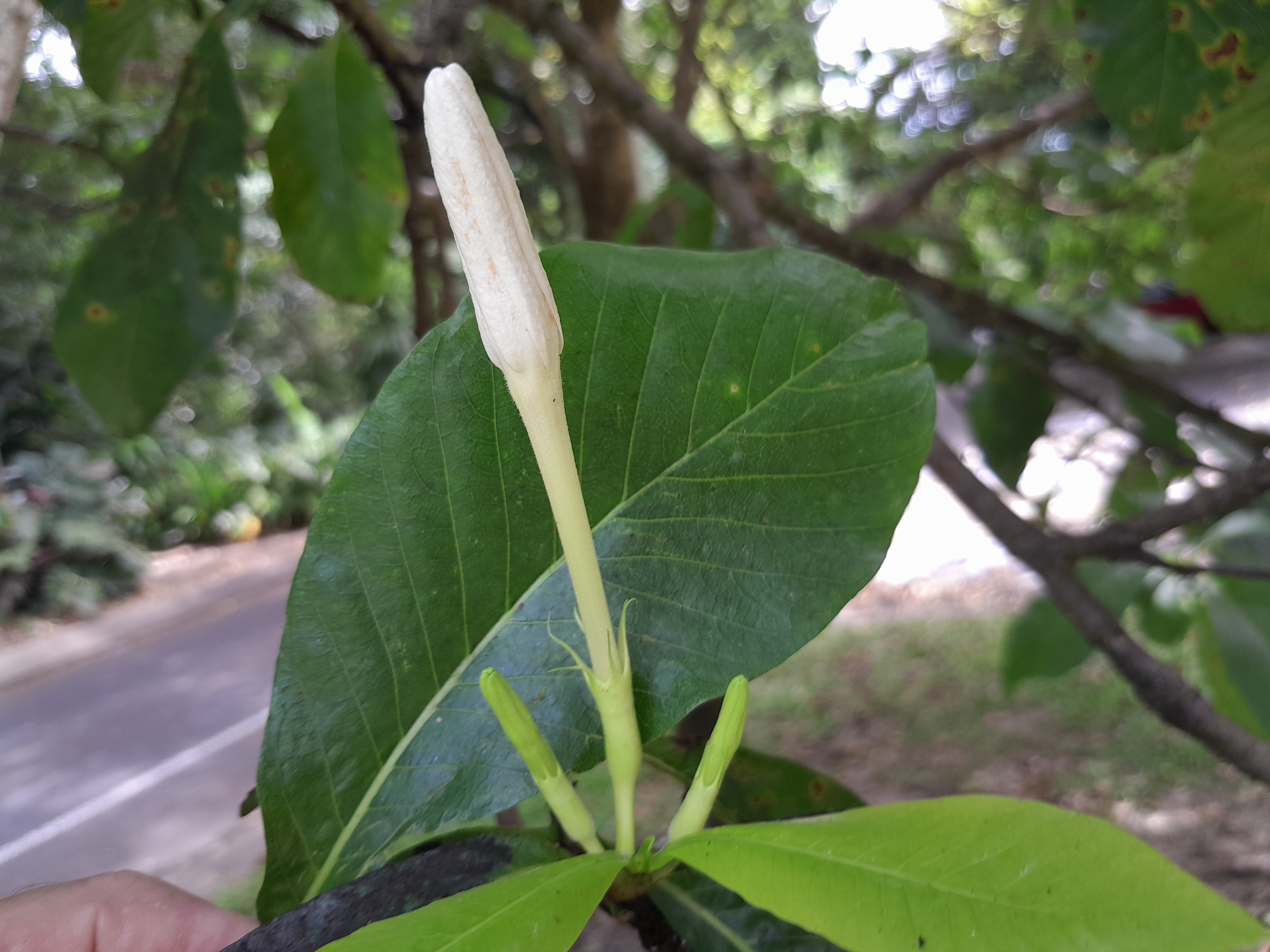
Flower buds

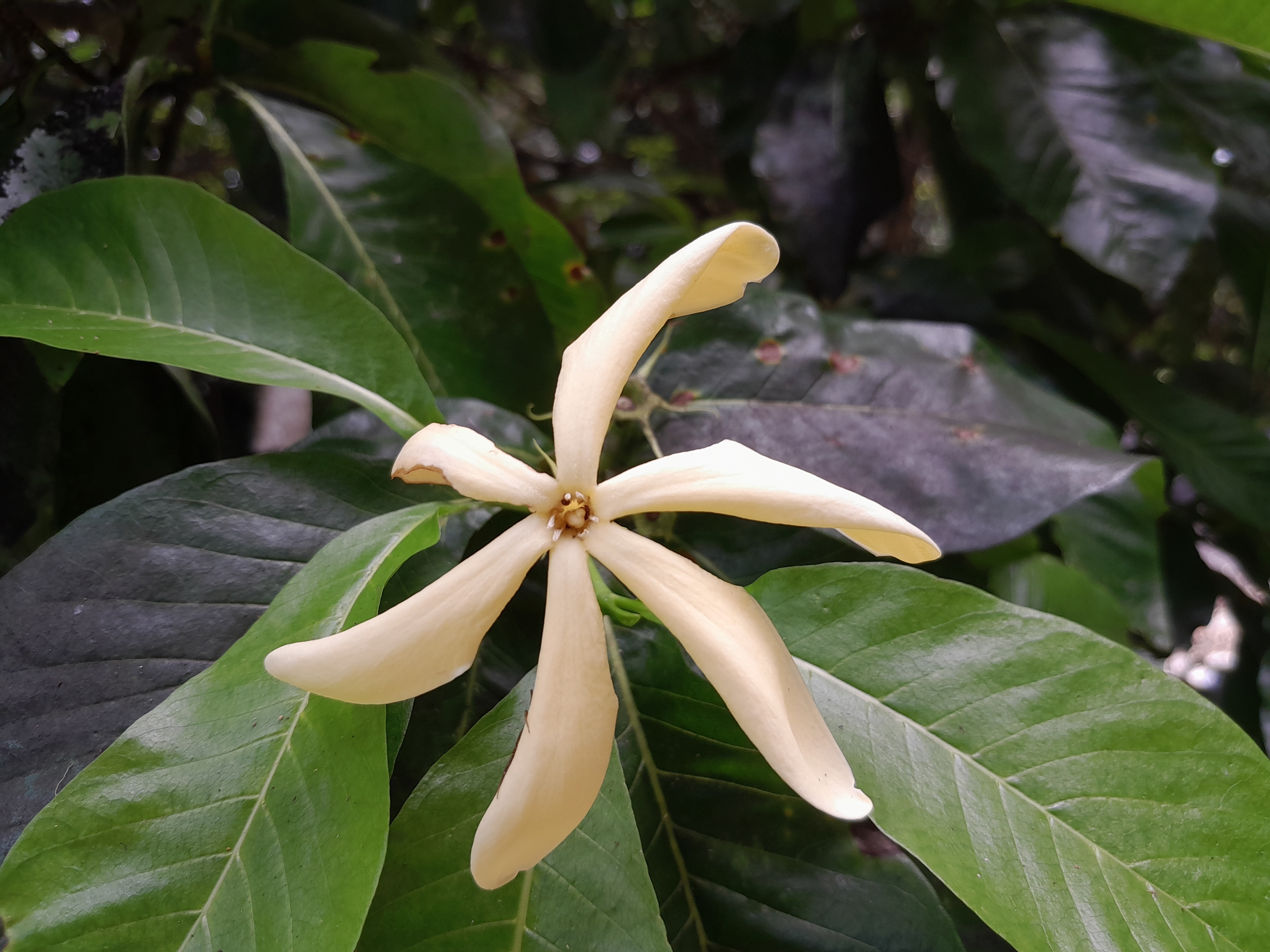
Flower

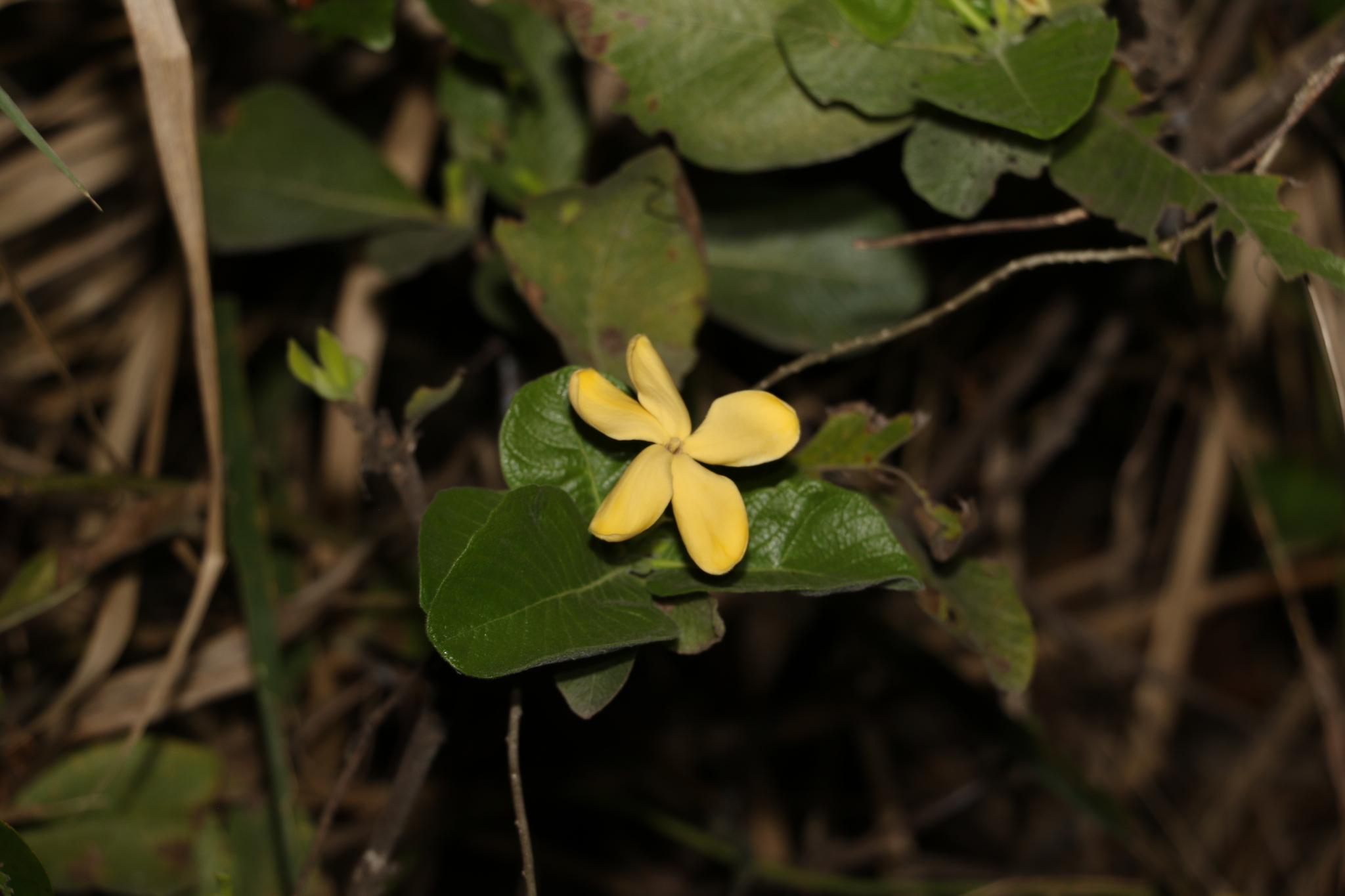
Flower, ageing to yellow

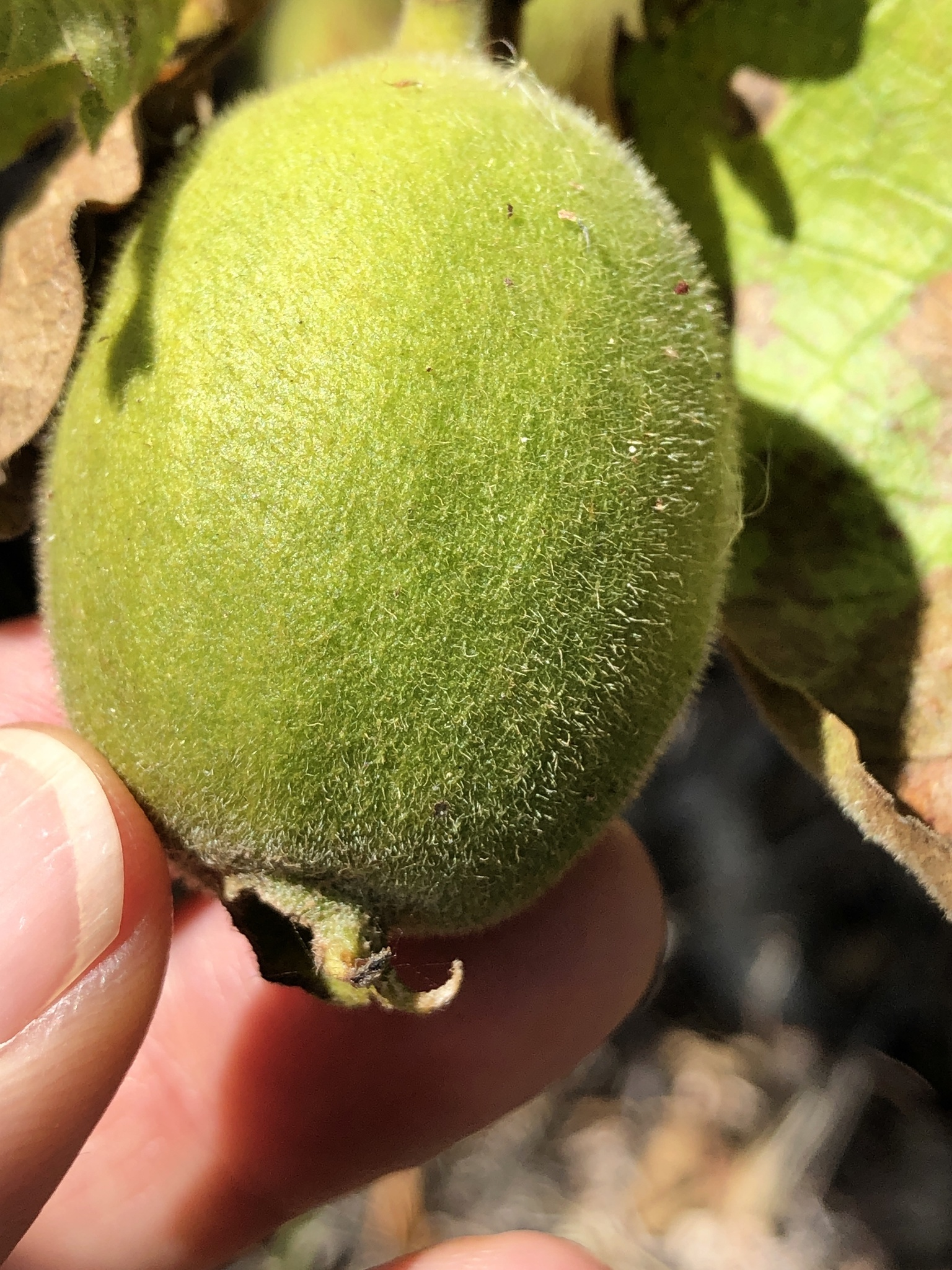
Fruit

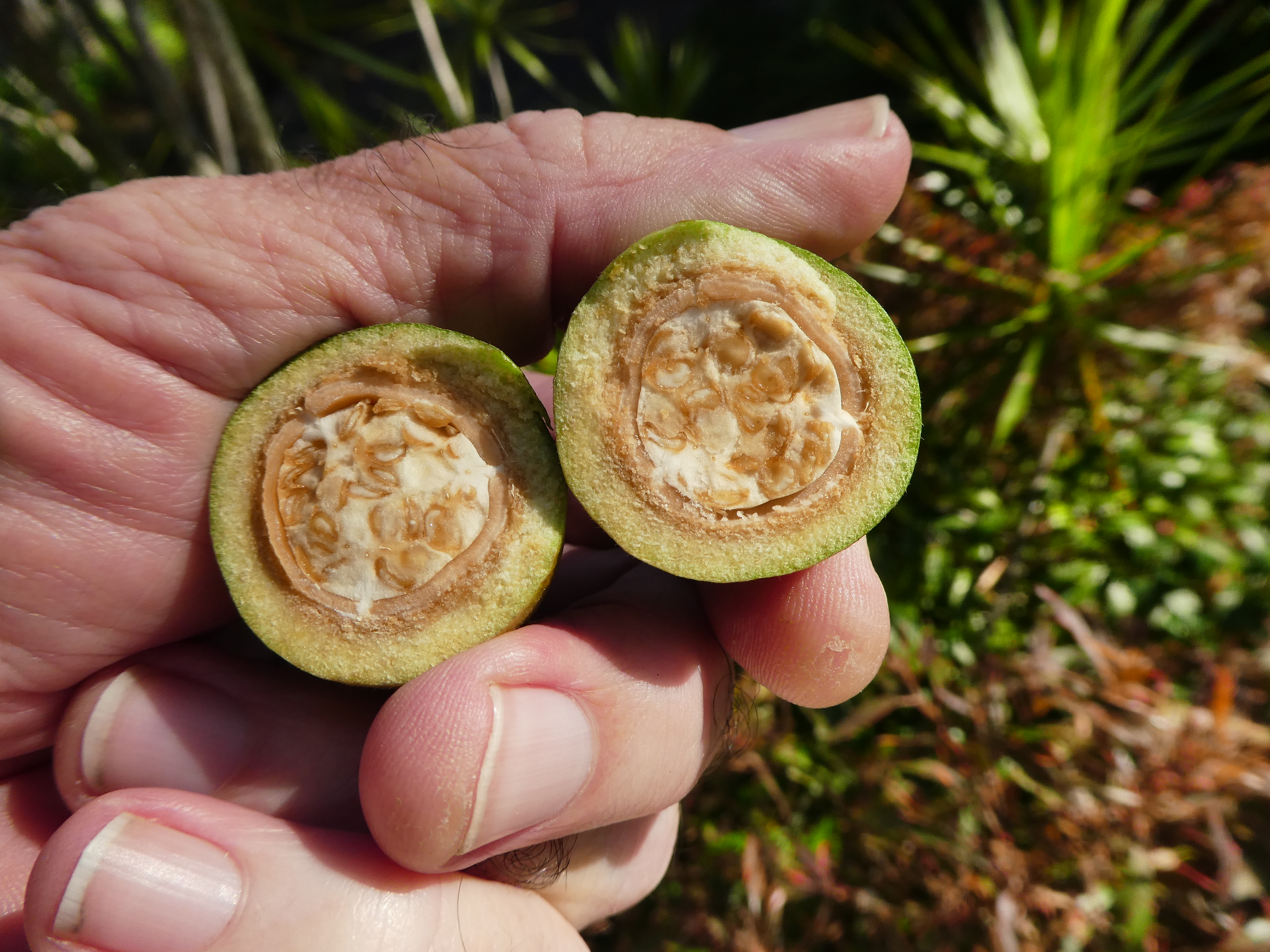
Dissected fruit
