= Cornukaempferia longipetiolata =

Scientific classification
- Kingdom: Plantae
- Clade: Tracheophytes
- Clade: Angiosperms
- Clade: Monocots
- Clade: Commelinids
- Order: Zingiberales
- Family: Zingiberaceae
- Genus: Cornukaempferia
- Species: C. longipetiolata

Binomial name
- Cornukaempferia longipetiolata Mood & K.Larsen

Species of flowering plant

Cornukaempferia longipetiolata is a species in the ginger family, Zingiberaceae. It was first described by John Donald Mood and Kai Larsen.

== Range ==
Cornukaempferia longipetiolata is native to Thailand.
