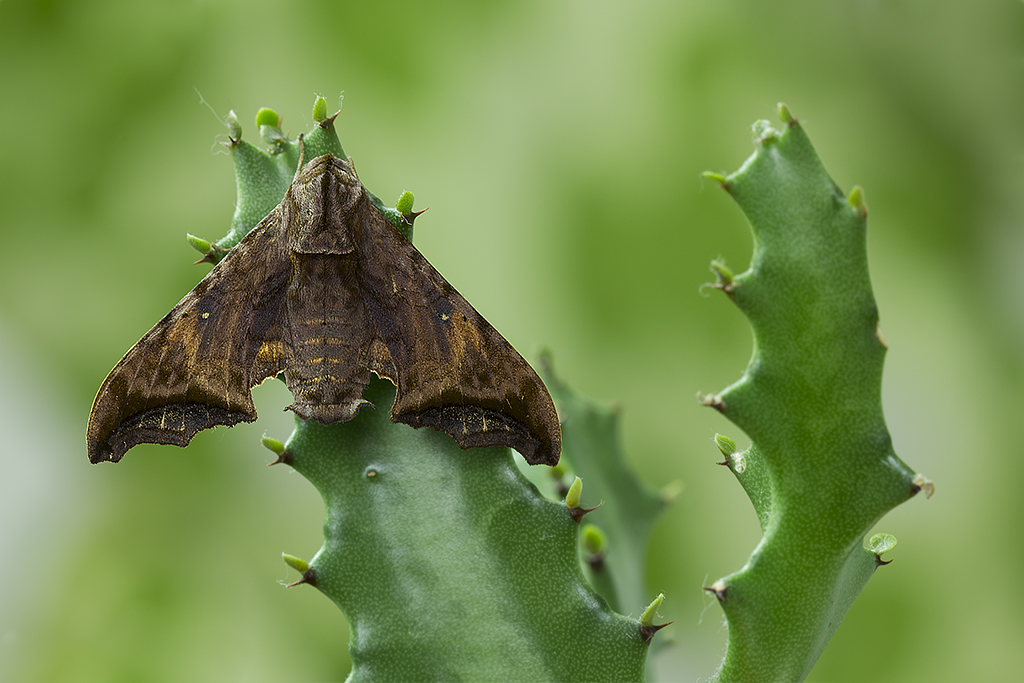

Scientific classification
- Domain: Eukaryota
- Kingdom: Animalia
- Phylum: Arthropoda
- Class: Insecta
- Order: Lepidoptera
- Family: Sphingidae
- Genus: Nyceryx
- Species: N. riscus

Binomial name
- Nyceryx riscus (Schaus, 1890)

Synonyms
- Enyo riscus Schaus, 1890; Pachygonia creusa Rothschild, 1894

= Nyceryx riscus =

Species of moth

Nyceryx riscus is a moth of the family Sphingidae.

== Distribution ==
It is found from Belize and Mexico to Costa Rica and further south to Bolivia and Argentina.

== Description ==
The wingspan is 50–58 mm.

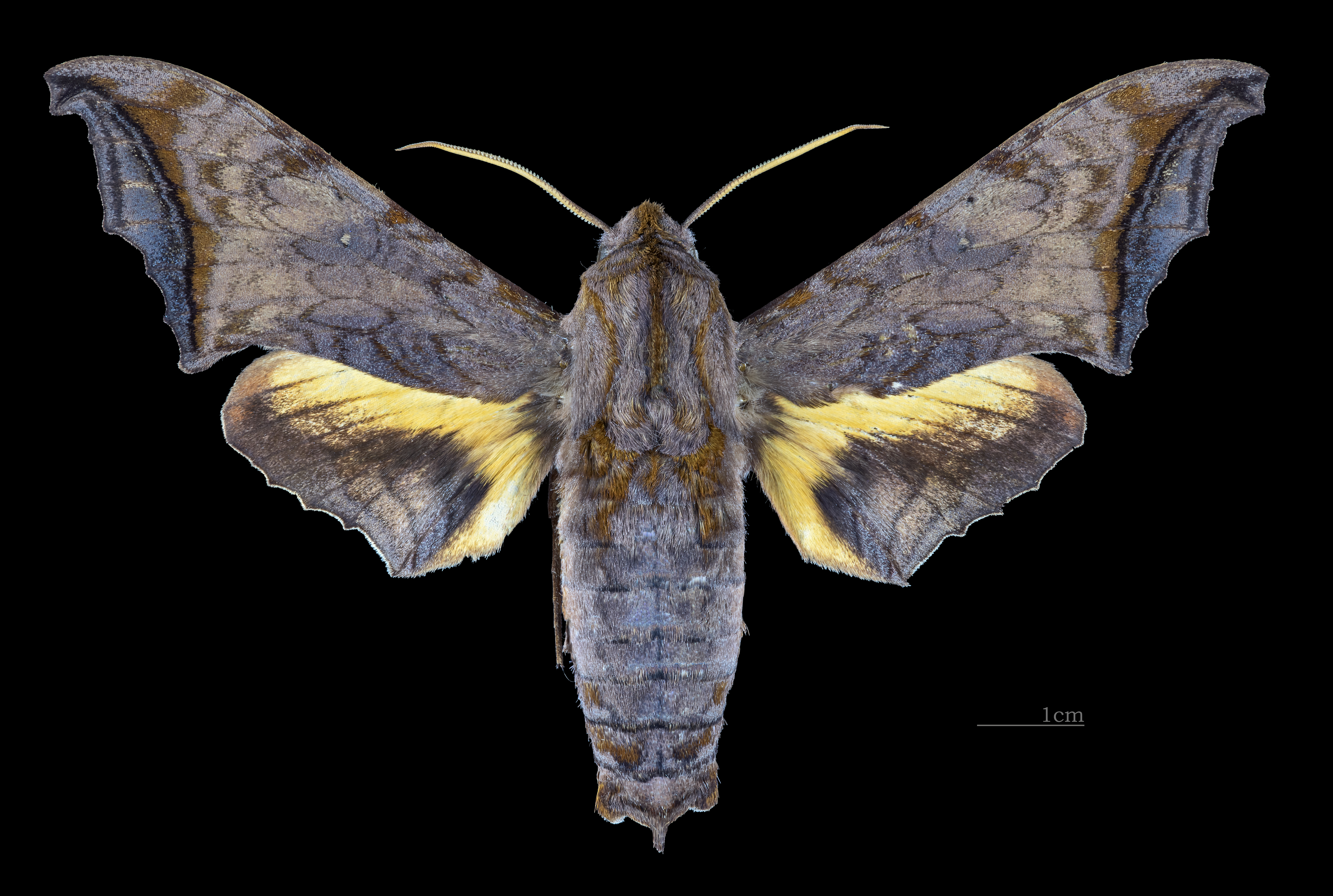
Male dorsal
(coll.MHNT)

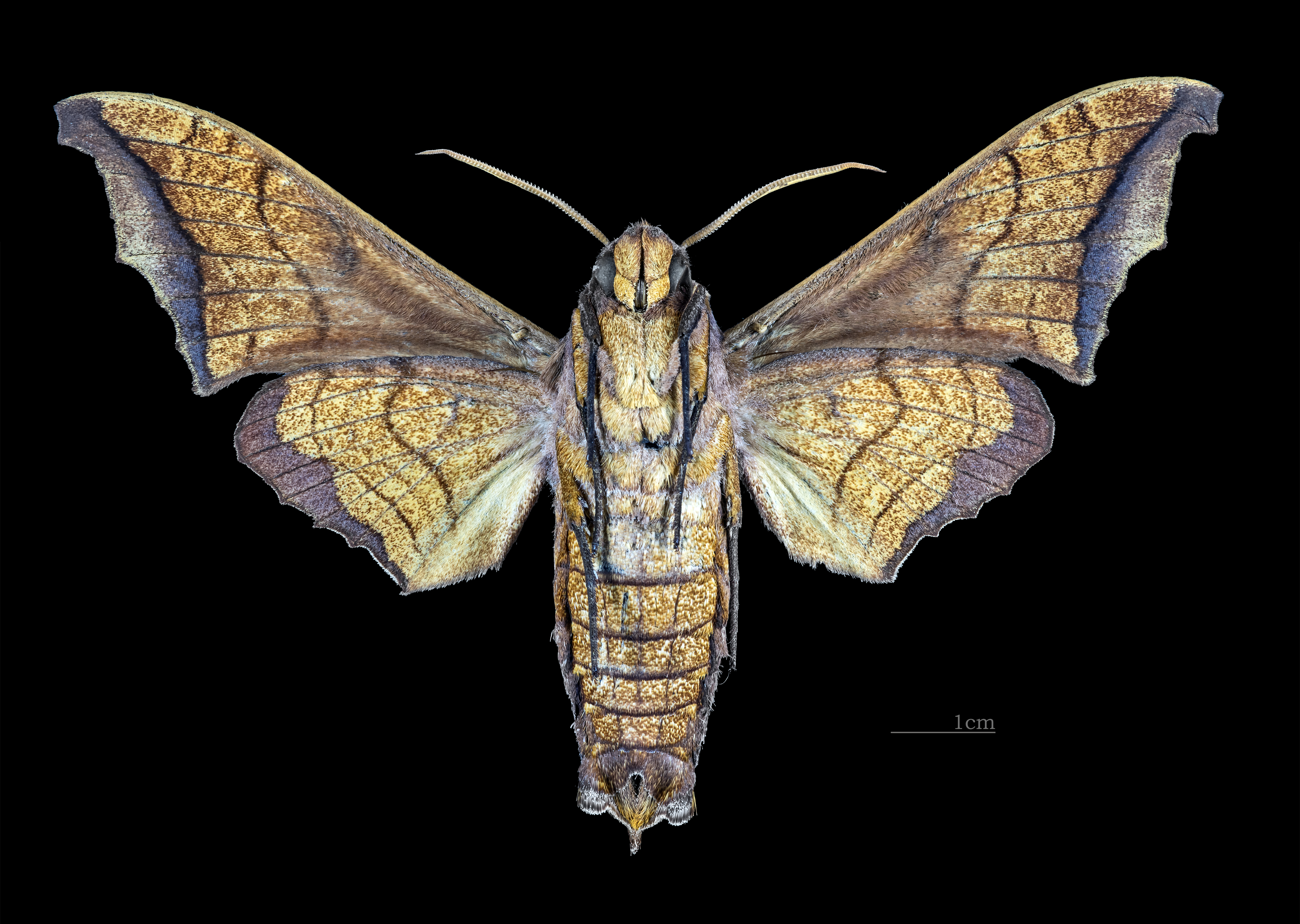
Male ventral
(coll.MHNT)

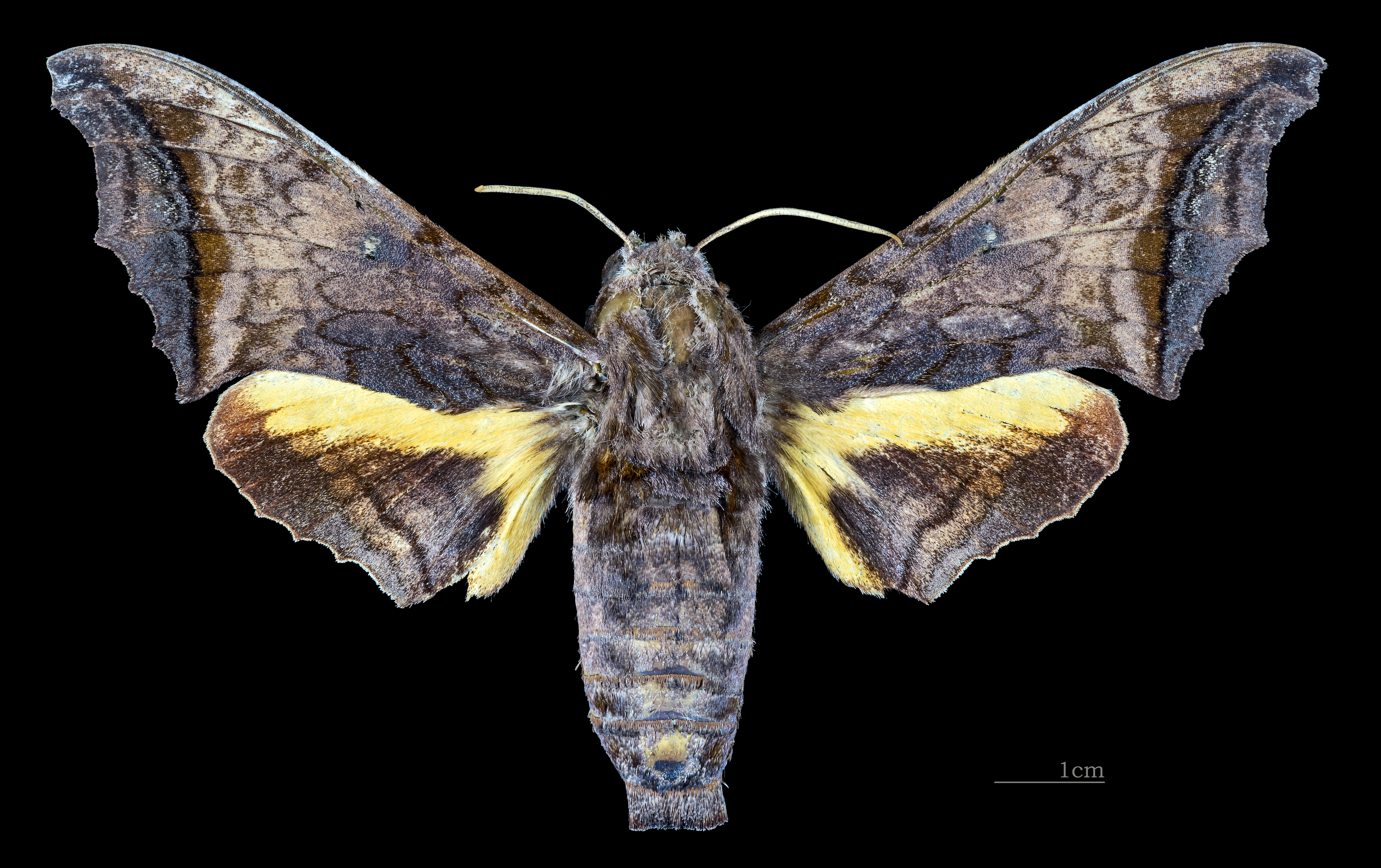
Female dorsal
(coll.MHNT)

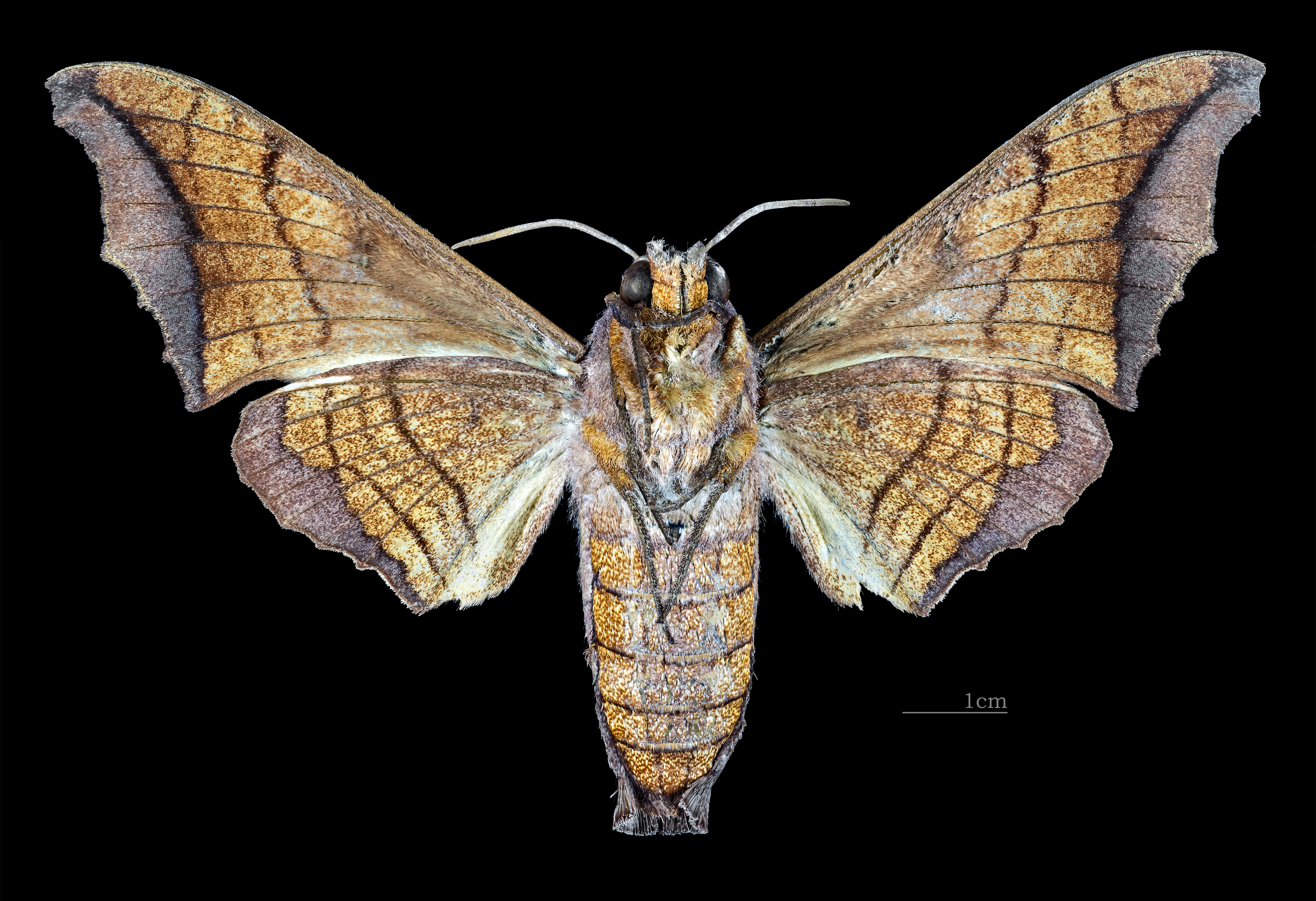
Female ventral
(coll.MHNT)

== Biology ==
Adults are probably on wing year round.

The larvae feed on mature leaves of Xylophragma seemannianum.
