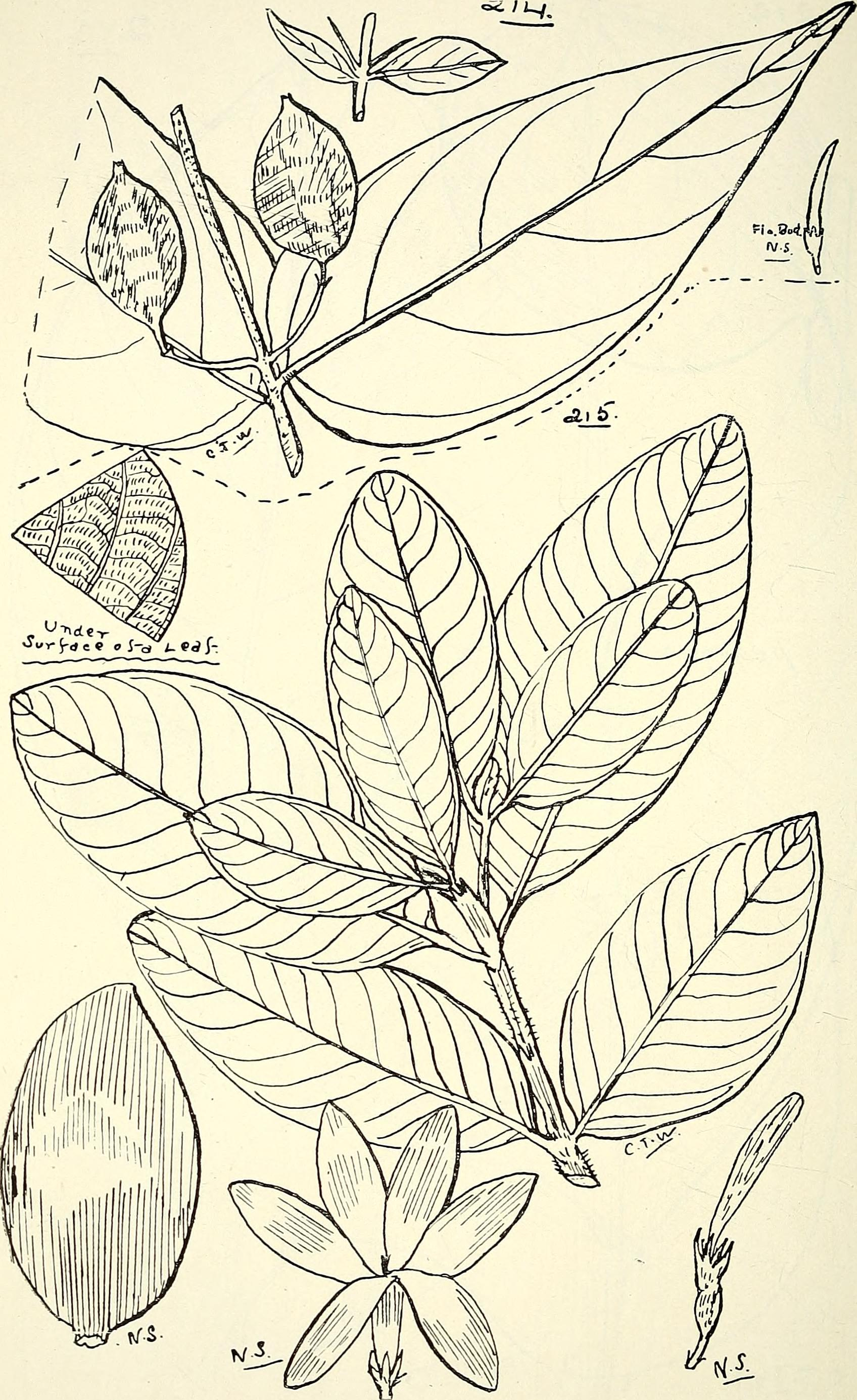
- Illustration (lower half) of a species of Larsenaikia, L. ochreata (drawn as Gardenia ochreata, number 215)

Scientific classification
- Kingdom: Plantae
- Clade: Embryophytes
- Clade: Tracheophytes
- Clade: Angiosperms
- Clade: Eudicots
- Clade: Asterids
- Order: Gentianales
- Family: Rubiaceae
- Subfamily: Ixoroideae
- Tribe: Gardenieae
- Genus: Larsenaikia; Tirveng.

Species
- Larsenaikia jardinei (F.Muell. ex Benth.) Tirveng.; Larsenaikia ochreata (F.Muell.) Tirveng.; Larsenaikia suffruticosa (R.Br. ex Benth.) Govaerts

= Larsenaikia =

Genus of flowering plants in the coffee family

Larsenaikia is a genus of flowering plants in the tribe Gardenieae of the family Rubiaceae. Its native range is Eastern and Northern Australia.

It contains three species—L. jardinei, L. ochreata, and L. suffruticosa—formerly classified in Gardenia, and possibly belonging to Kailarsenia.

Larsenaikia is a taxonomic anagram derived from the name of the confamilial genus Kailarsenia. The latter name is a taxonomic patronym honoring Kai Larsen, professor of botany at Århus University, Denmark.
