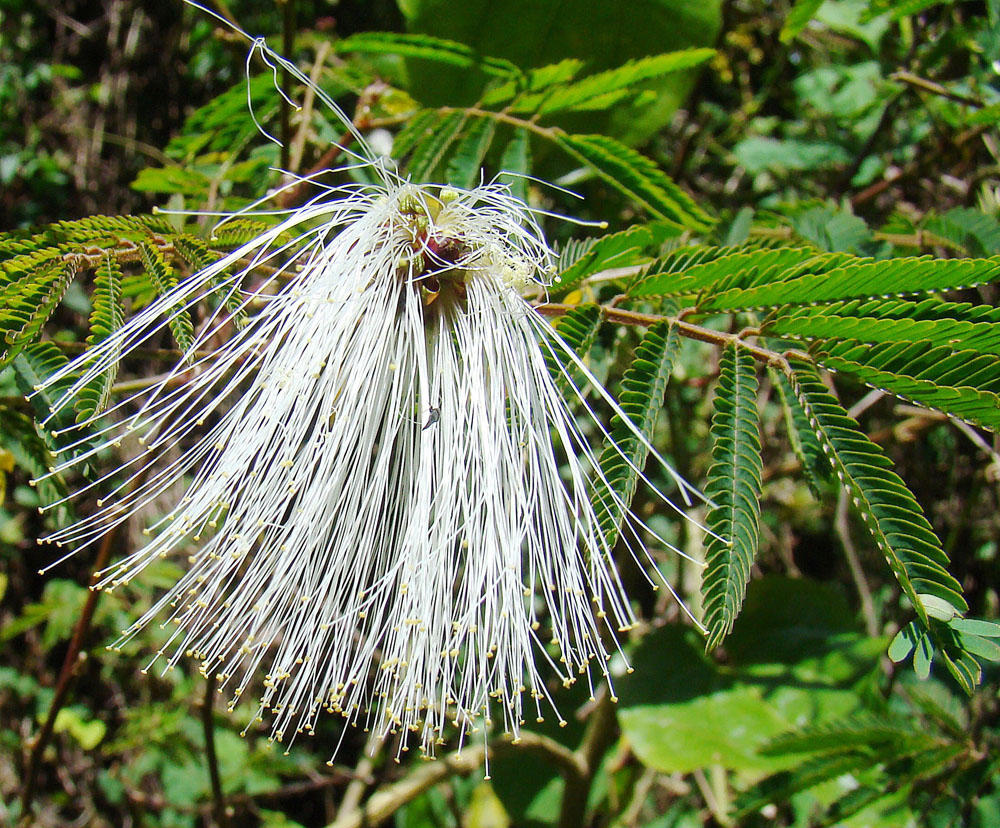
- Hydrochorea elegans from western Panama

Conservation status
- Near Threatened (IUCN 3.1)

Scientific classification
- Kingdom: Plantae
- Clade: Tracheophytes
- Clade: Angiosperms
- Clade: Eudicots
- Clade: Rosids
- Order: Fabales
- Family: Fabaceae
- Subfamily: Caesalpinioideae
- Clade: Mimosoid clade
- Genus: Hydrochorea
- Species: H. elegans

Binomial name
- Hydrochorea elegans (Ducke) M.V.B.Soares, Iganci & M.P.Morim (2022)

Synonyms
- Albizia duckeana L.Rico (2000); Albizia elegans (Ducke) L.Rico (1999 publ. 2000), nom. illeg.; Balizia elegans (Ducke) Barneby & J.W.Grimes (1996); Pithecolobium elegans Ducke (1922)

= Hydrochorea elegans =

Species of legume

Hydrochorea elegans is a species of flowering plants in the family Fabaceae. It is a tree in the emergent layer of the tropical rainforest of southern Central America (Honduras, Nicaragua, and Costa Rica) and northern South America (Bolivia, French Guiana, and northern Brazil). The species was formerly known as Balizia elegans, and reassigned to genus Hydrochorea in 2022.
