= Xylophragma seemannianum =

Scientific classification
- Kingdom: Plantae
- Clade: Tracheophytes
- Clade: Angiosperms
- Clade: Eudicots
- Clade: Asterids
- Order: Lamiales
- Family: Bignoniaceae
- Genus: Xylophragma
- Species: X. seemannianum

Binomial name
- Xylophragma seemannianum (Kuntze) Sandwith

Synonyms
- Adenocalymma cocleense Pittier; Distictis rovirosana J.D.Sm.; Handroanthus floccosus (Klotzsch) Mattos; Saldanhaea seemanniana Kuntze; Tabebuia floccosa (Klotzsch) Sprague & Sandwith; Tecoma floccosa Klotzsch; Tecoma floccosa Klotzsch ex Bureau & K. Schum.

Species of flowering plant

Xylophragma seemannianum is a species of flowering plant in the family Bignoniaceae which has a native range from southern Mexico to Brazil.

== Description ==
The leaves of X. seemannianum are of variable shapes and sizes, with their terminal leaflet usually being longer and having a different shape from the lateral ones. It has both axillary and terminal inflorescences, and its shorter internodes mean it also has shorter inflorescences.

It has tubular calyces which are of a long cuspidate form. Its petals are large and grow to be greater than 2.7 centimetres (1.1 in). They are wooly and covered by branched trichomes on the outside. Its ovary is conical and usually smooth, but is also furrowed. It has lance-like stigmas. The fruit is woody and its surface is smooth, while the seeds are round and have small papillae.

The petioles are woolly and also have branched trichomes when they are young; however, these change to glabrescent or pubescent when the plant is mature. The calyx is a tubular costate shape with a cuspidate rim.

== Conservation ==
While X. seemannianum has no official conservational status from the IUCN, it has been suggested to be categorized under the Least Concern (LC) status. It is known from 53 different locations and has a very large extent of occurrence. However, when evaluating its status based on population density and habitat type by increasing grid width, a more conservative status of Endangered (EN) or Vulnerable (VU) could also be possible.
