= Hydrochorea acreana =

Conservation status
- Vulnerable (IUCN 3.1)

Scientific classification
- Kingdom: Plantae
- Clade: Tracheophytes
- Clade: Angiosperms
- Clade: Eudicots
- Clade: Rosids
- Order: Fabales
- Family: Fabaceae
- Subfamily: Caesalpinioideae
- Clade: Mimosoid clade
- Genus: Hydrochorea
- Species: H. acreana

Binomial name
- Hydrochorea acreana (J.F.Macbr.) Barneby & J.W.Grimes (1996)

Synonyms
- Abarema acreana (J.F.Macbr.) L.Rico (1999 publ. 2000); Pithecellobium acreanum J.F.Macbr. (1943)

Species of plant

Hydrochorea acreana, known as the Ingá-fava, is a tree species in the legume family (Fabaceae). It is native to portions of Central and South America, including Nicaragua, Costa Rica, Colombia, Venezuela, Peru, and northern Brazil. Fruiting trees apparently have never been found.
