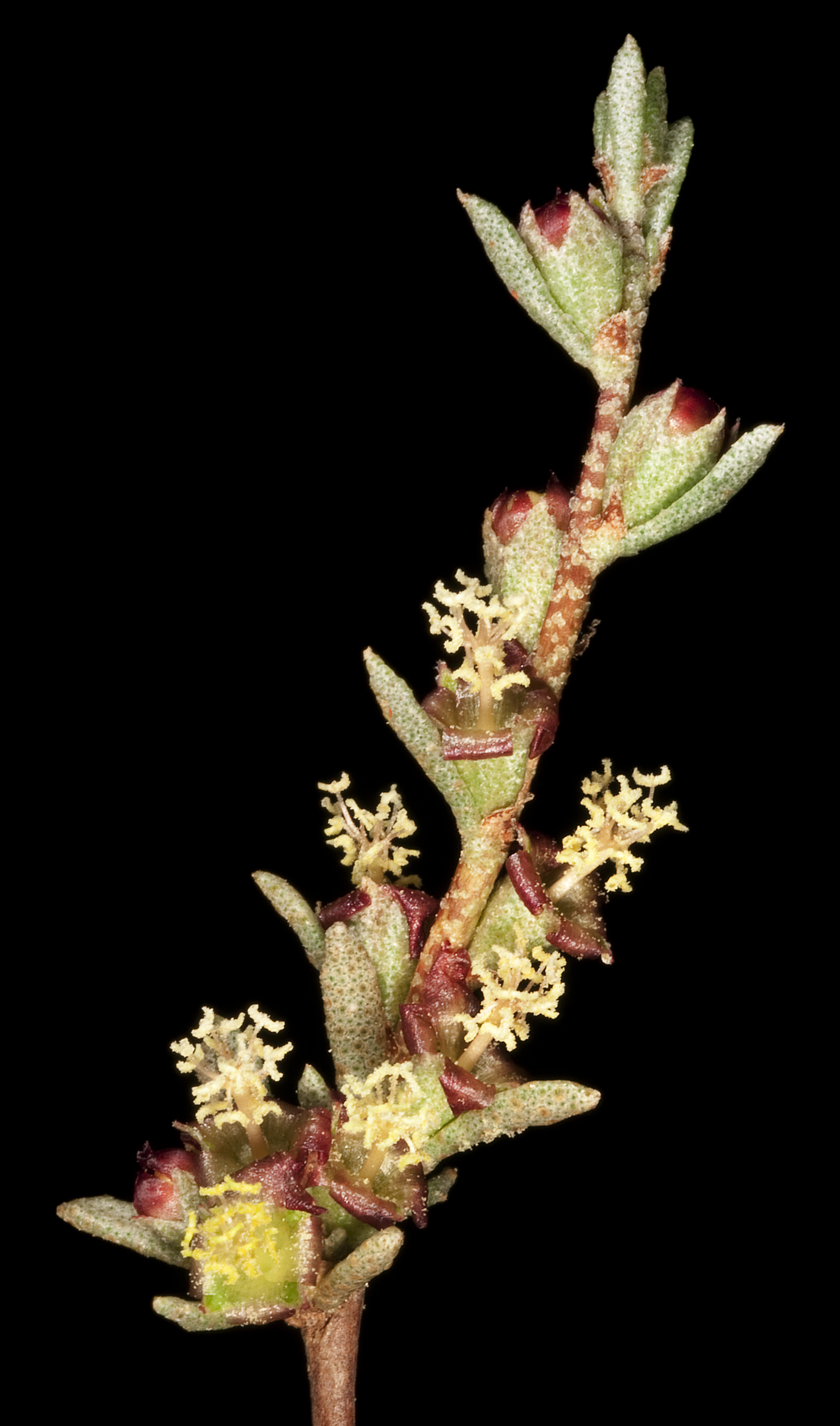
- Lawrencia squamata

Scientific classification
- Kingdom: Plantae
- Clade: Tracheophytes
- Clade: Angiosperms
- Clade: Eudicots
- Clade: Rosids
- Order: Malvales
- Family: Malvaceae
- Genus: Lawrencia
- Species: L. squamata

Binomial name
- Lawrencia squamata Nees
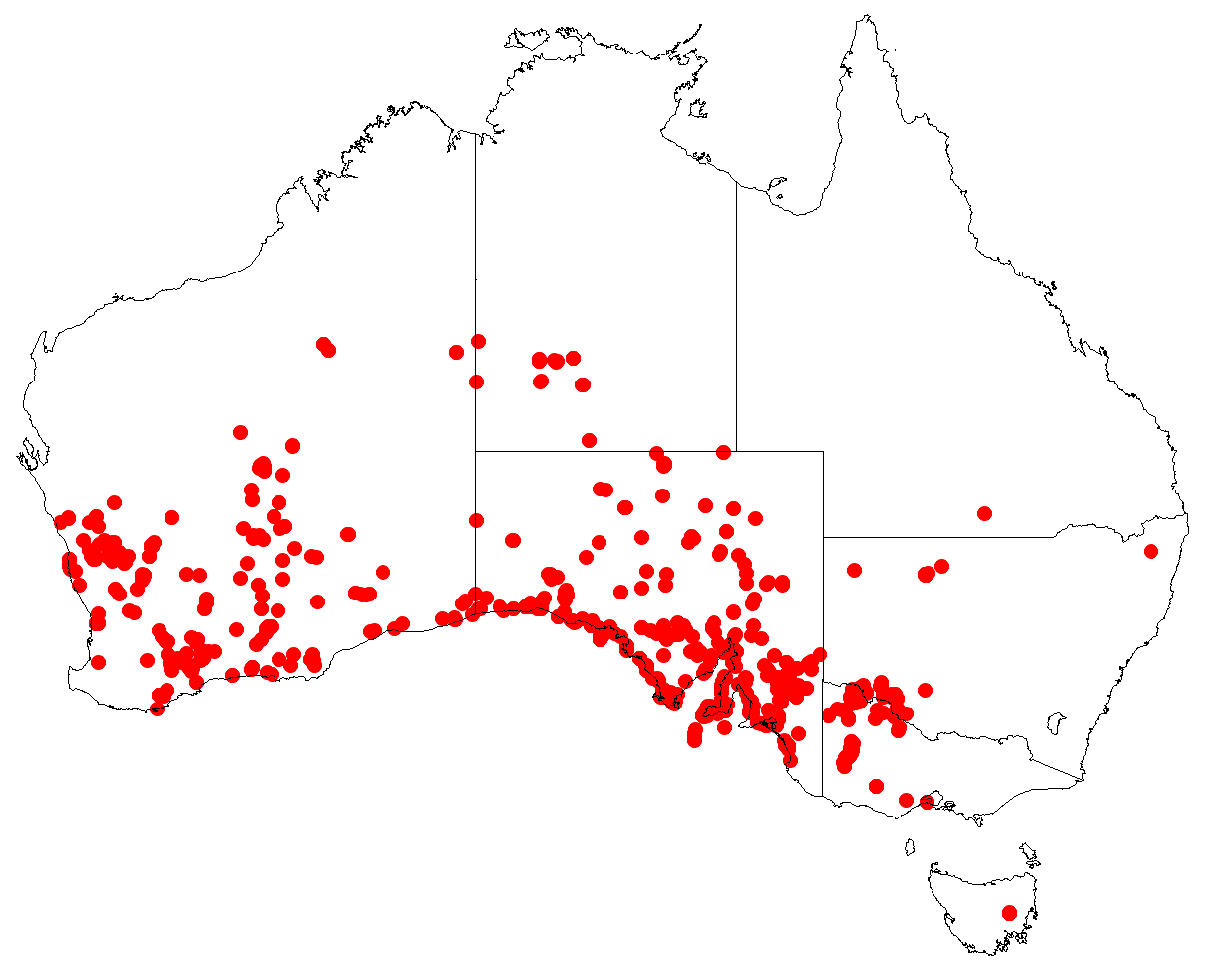
- Occurrence data from AVH

Synonyms
- Halothamnus microphyllus (F.Muell.) F.Muell.; Plagianthus microphyllus F.Muell.; Plagianthus squamatus (Nees) Benth.; Selenothamnus squamatus (Nees) Melville

= Lawrencia squamata =

Species of plant

Lawrencia squamata is a species of plant in the mallow family, Malvaceae. It is endemic to Australia and occurs in all Australian states. (all mainland states)

== Description ==
Lawrencia squamata, thorny lawrencia, or fan-leaved lawrencia, is a spiny dioecious shrub/herb, from 0.02 to 1.5 m high. The leaves are scaly and not lobed, 10 to 40 mm long and 5 to 20 mm wide, with peltate scales. The flowers have both a calyx and a corolla, with the corolla being yellow, white, red or purple,. The flowers are axillary. They are seen between August and January in WA, May to November in SA, September to November in Victoria. The stamens are many and united.

== Habitat ==
It grows on clayey soils, and is found fringing saltlakes and salty depressions.

== Taxonomy ==
Lawrencia squamata was first described by Nees von Esenbeck in 1845.
