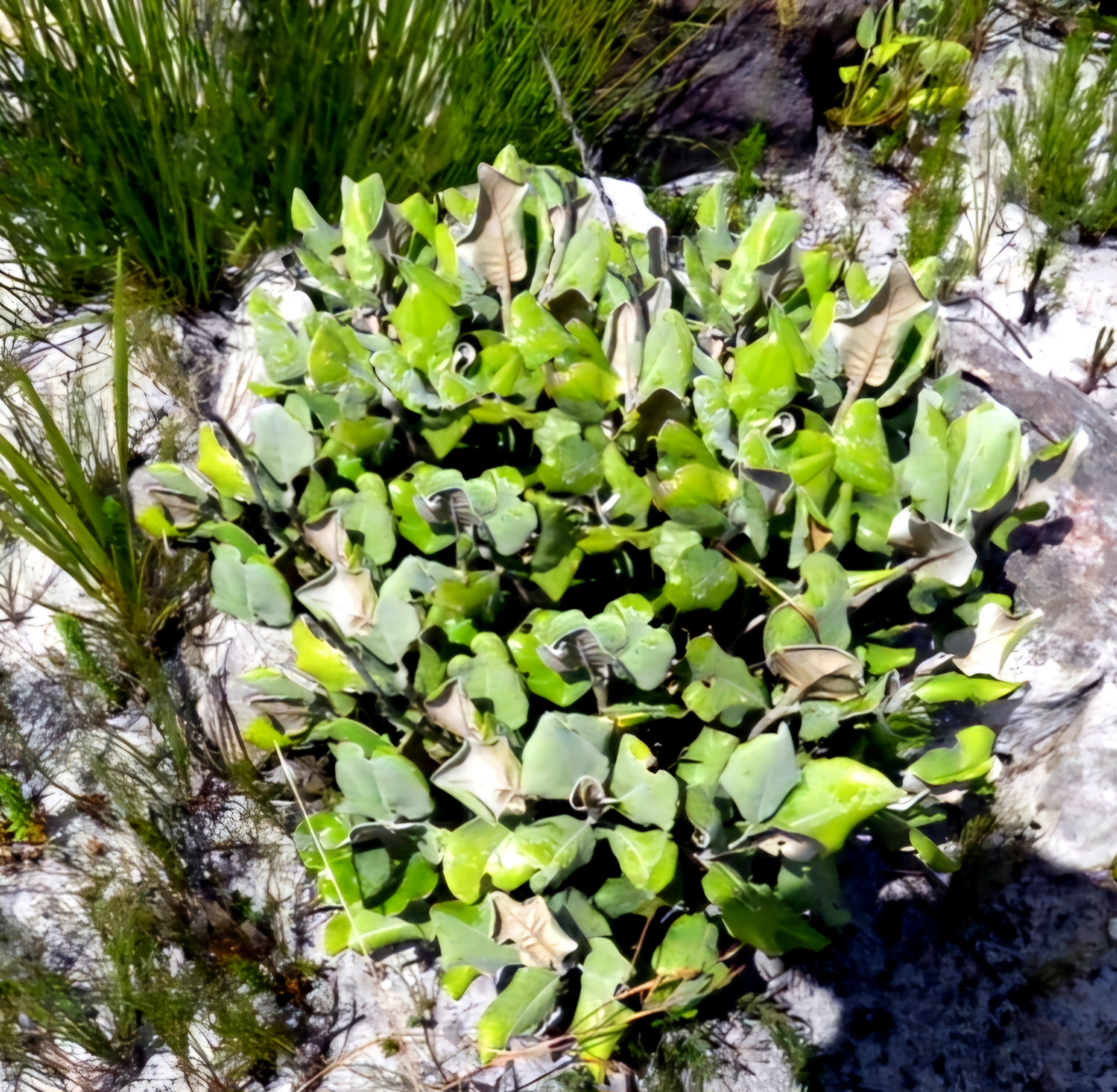

Scientific classification
- Kingdom: Plantae
- Clade: Embryophytes
- Clade: Tracheophytes
- Clade: Angiosperms
- Clade: Eudicots
- Clade: Asterids
- Order: Asterales
- Family: Asteraceae
- Subfamily: Asteroideae
- Tribe: Senecioneae
- Genus: Capelio; B.Nord.

Synonyms
- Alciope DC.

= Capelio =

Genus of flowering plants

Capelio is a genus of flowering plants in the family Asteraceae first described as a genus in 1836 with the name Alciope. It was renamed Capelio in 2002 after it was determined that the name Alciope was not legitimately published according to international nomenclatural rules. Capelio is a taxonomic anagram derived from the former name Alciope.

The entire genus is endemic to Cape Province in South Africa.

Species :

- Capelio caledonica B.Nord.
- Capelio tabularis (Thunb.) B.Nord.
- Capelio tomentosa (Burm.f.) B.Nord.
