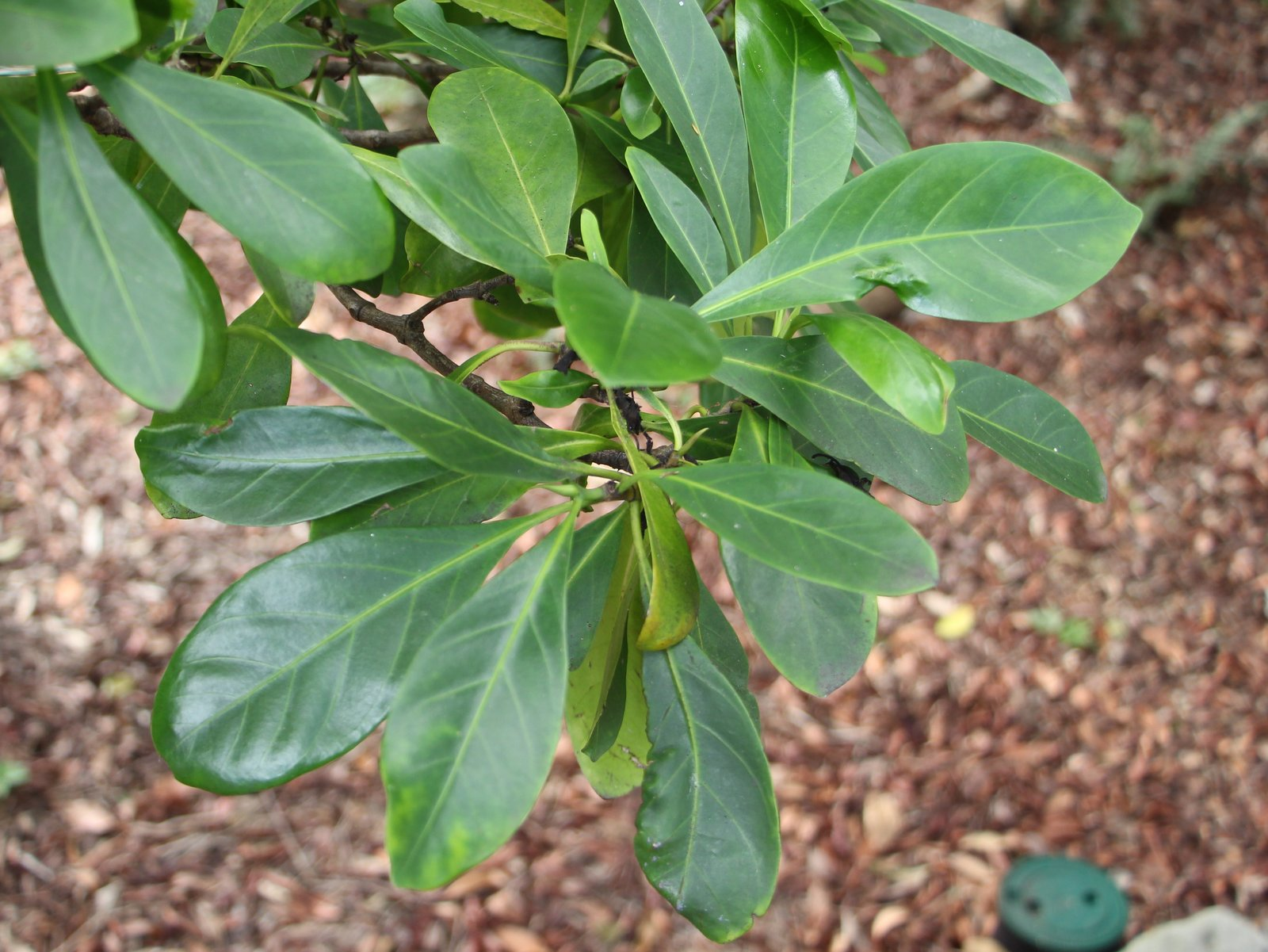
- Specimen growing in the Royal Botanic Garden, Sydney

Conservation status
- Least Concern (NCA)

Scientific classification
- Kingdom: Plantae
- Clade: Embryophytes
- Clade: Tracheophytes
- Clade: Angiosperms
- Clade: Eudicots
- Clade: Asterids
- Order: Gentianales
- Family: Rubiaceae
- Genus: Larsenaikia
- Species: L. jardinei

Binomial name
- Larsenaikia jardinei (F.Muell. ex Benth.) Tirveng.

Synonyms
- Kailarsenia jardinei (F.Muell. ex Benth.) Puttock.; Gardenia jardinei F.Muell. ex Benth.

= Larsenaikia jardinei =

Species of flowering plant

Larsenaikia jardinei is a shrub or small tree in the coffee family Rubiaceae, endemic to Central Eastern Queensland in Australia.
