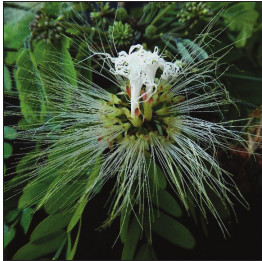
- Hydrochorea corymbosa

Scientific classification
- Kingdom: Plantae
- Clade: Tracheophytes
- Clade: Angiosperms
- Clade: Eudicots
- Clade: Rosids
- Order: Fabales
- Family: Fabaceae
- Subfamily: Caesalpinioideae
- Clade: Mimosoid clade
- Genus: Hydrochorea; Barneby & J.W.Grimes

Species
- 11; see text

Synonyms
- Balizia Barneby & J.W.Grimes (1996)

= Hydrochorea =

Genus of legumes

Hydrochorea is a genus of flowering plants in the family Fabaceae. It includes 11 species native to Central and South America and west and west-central Africa. It belongs to the mimosoid clade of the subfamily Caesalpinioideae.

== Species ==
- Hydrochorea acreana (J.F.Macbr.) Barneby & J.W.Grimes
- Hydrochorea corymbosa (Rich.) Barneby & J.W.Grimes
- Hydrochorea elegans (Ducke) M.V.B.Soares, Iganci & M.P.Morim
- Hydrochorea gonggrijpii (Kleinhoonte) Barneby & J.W.Grimes
- Hydrochorea leucocalyx (Britton & Rose) Iganci, M.V.B.Soares & M.P.Morim
- Hydrochorea marginata (Benth.) Barneby & J.W.Grimes
- Hydrochorea marginata (Spruce ex Benth.) Barneby & J.W.Grimes
- Hydrochorea obliquifoliolata (De Wild.) E.J.M.Koenen
- Hydrochorea panurensis (Spruce ex Benth.) M.V.B.Soares, M.P.Morim & Iganci
- Hydrochorea pedicellaris (DC.) M.V.B.Soares, Iganci & M.P.Morim
- Hydrochorea rhombifolia (Benth.) E.J.M.Koenen
- Hydrochorea uaupensis M.P.Morim, Iganci & E.J.M.Koenen

== Etymology ==
The synonym Balizia is a taxonomic anagram derived from the name of the confamilial genus Albizia. The latter name is a taxonomic patronym honoring the Italian nobleman Filippo degli Albizzi, who introduced Albizia julibrissin to Europe in the mid-18th century.
