= Relchela =

Scientific classification
- Kingdom: Plantae
- Clade: Embryophytes
- Clade: Tracheophytes
- Clade: Angiosperms
- Clade: Monocots
- Clade: Commelinids
- Order: Poales
- Family: Poaceae
- Subfamily: Pooideae
- Supertribe: Poodae
- Tribe: Poeae
- Subtribe: Echinopogoninae
- Genus: Relchela; Steud.
- Species: R. panicoides

Binomial name
- Relchela panicoides Steud.

Synonyms
- Lechlera Steud. 1855, superfluous and rejected name not Griseb. 1857 (Iridaceae) (Note: This name is also attributed to a member of Iridaceae, and is synonym of Solenomelus.); Panicum oligostachyum Steud.; Agrostis asperula Phil.; Agrostis corralensis Phil.; Agrostis limonias Phil.

Genus of flowering plants

Relchela is a genus of plants in the grass family. The only known species is Relchela panicoides, native to Chile and Argentina (Neuquén, Río Negro, Chubut, Neuquén).

The name Relchela is a taxonomic anagram derived from Lechlera. The latter name is a taxonomic patronym honoring the German botanist Willibald Lechler (1814–1856).
