= Occupancy–abundance relationship =

Ecological relationship between species' range sizes and abundance

In ecology, the occupancy–abundance (O–A) relationship is the relationship between the abundance of species and the size of their ranges within a region. This relationship is perhaps one of the most well-documented relationships in macroecology, and applies both intra- and interspecifically (within and among species). In most cases, the O–A relationship is a positive relationship. Although an O–A relationship would be expected, given that a species colonizing a region must pass through the origin (zero abundance, zero occupancy) and could reach some theoretical maximum abundance and distribution (that is, occupancy and abundance can be expected to co-vary), the relationship described here is somewhat more substantial, in that observed changes in range are associated with greater-than-proportional changes in abundance. Although this relationship appears to be pervasive (e.g. Gaston 1996 and references therein), and has important implications for the conservation of endangered species, the mechanism(s) underlying it remains poorly understood.

== Important terms ==
Range – means the total area occupied by the species of interest in the region under study (see below 'Measures of species geographic range')

Abundance – means the average density of the species of interest across all occupied patches (i.e. average abundance does not include the area of unoccupied patches)

Intraspecific occupancy–abundance relationship – means the relationship between abundance and range size within a single species generated using time series data

Interspecific occupancy–abundance relationship – means the relationship between relative abundance and range size of an assemblage of closely related species at a specific point in time (or averaged across a short time period). The interspecific O-A relationship may arise from the combination of the intraspecific O–A relationships within the region

== Measures of species' geographic range ==
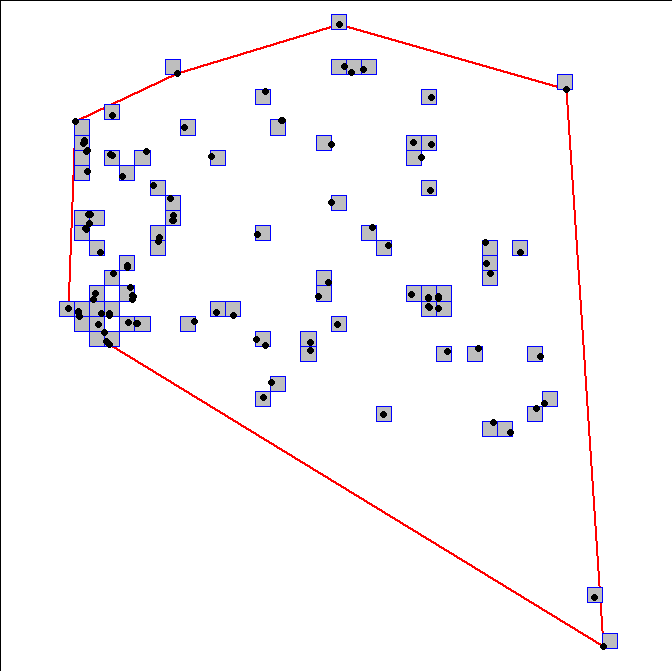
Lawrencia densiflora Area of Occupancy (AOO) plot using a 30 km x 30 km grid. There are 81 occupied cells, giving an AOO of 81 x 900 (72900) square kilometres (and illustrating the dependence of AOO on scale or grid size).

In the discussion of relationships with range size, it is important to define which range is under investigation. Gaston (following Udvardy) describes the potential range of a species as the theoretical maximum range that a species could occupy should all barriers to dispersal be removed, while the realized range is the portion of the potential range that the species currently occupies. The realized range can be further subdivided, for example, into the breeding and non-reproductive ranges. Explicit consideration of a particular portion of the realized range in analysis of range size can significantly influence the results. For example, many seabirds forage over vast areas of ocean, but breed only on small islands, thus the breeding range is significantly smaller than the non-reproductive range. However, in many terrestrial bird species, the pattern is reversed, with the winter (non-reproductive) range somewhat smaller than the breeding range.

The definition of range is further confounded by how the total realized range size is measured. There are two types of measurements commonly in use, the extent of occurrence (EOO) (For definition: see ALA and Fig.1) and the area of occupancy (AOO) (see also the Scaling pattern of occupancy, and for a definition, see Fig. 2 and ALA). The EOO can best be thought of as the minimum convex polygon encompassing all known normal occurrences of a particular species and is the measure of range most commonly found in field guides. The AOO is the subset of the EOO where the species actually occurs. In essence, the AOO acknowledges that there are holes in the distribution of a species within its EOO, and attempts to correct for these vacancies. A common way to describe the AOO of a species is to divide the study region into a matrix of cells and record if the species is present in or absent from each cell. For example, in describing O–A relationships for common British birds, Quinn et al. found that the occupancy at the finest resolution (10 x 10 km squares) best explained abundance patterns. In a similar manner, Zuckerberg et al. used Breeding Bird Atlas data measured on cells 5 × 5 km to describe breeding bird occupancy in New York State. IUCN typically uses a cell size of 2 × 2 km in calculating AOO.

In much of macroecology, the use of EOO as a measure of range size may be appropriate; however, AOO is a more appropriate measure when evaluating O–A relationships. In macroecological investigations that are primarily biogeographical in nature, the variables of interest can be expected to vary most from one extent of occurrence to the opposite, and less so through discontinuities contained within the total EOO. However, when investigating O-A relationships, the area occupied by a species is the variable of interest, and the inclusion of discontinuities within the EOO could significantly influence results. In the extreme case where occupied habitats are distributed at random throughout the EOO, a relationship between abundance and range size (EOO) would not be expected. Because O–A relationships have strong conservation implications, Gaston and Fuller have argued that clear distinctions need to be made as to the purpose of the EOO and AOO as measures of range size, and that in association with O-A relationships the AOO is the more useful measure of species abundance.

No matter which concept we use in studies, it is essential to realize that occupancy is only a reflection of species distribution under a certain spatial scale. Occupancy, as well as other measures of species distributions (e.g. over-dispersion and spatial autocorrelation), is scale-dependent. As such, studies on the comparison of O–A relationships should be aware of the issue of scale sensitivity (compare text of Fig 1 & Fig.2). Furthermore, measuring species range, whether it is measured by the convex hull or occupancy (occurrence), is part of the percolation process and can be explained by the percolation theory,

=== Temporal occupancy-abundance relationship ===
The temporal version of the occupancy-abundance relationship has been studied less extensively than the spatial version above, a similar pattern emerges. In a long-term time series of fish abundance in the Bristol Channel, it was observed that species that were present very occasionally were also in low abundance (comprising most species; a well-known general pattern observed in species abundance distributions), whereas species that were frequently present were also the most abundant. This is also a temporal analogue of Hanski's core-satellite hypothesis -- that species may be split into occasionally present and frequently present species.

== Possible explanations ==
A suite of possible explanations have been proposed to describe why positive intra- and interspecific O–A relationships are observed. Following Gaston et al. 1997 Gaston and Blackburn 2000 Gaston et al. 2000, and Gaston 2003 these reasons include:

=== Statistical explanations ===
One way to deal with observed O–A relationships is, in essence, to deny their existence. An argument against the existence of O–A relationships is that they are merely sampling artefacts. Given that rare species are less likely to be sampled, at a given sampling effort, one can expect to detect rare species occupying fewer sites than common ones, even if the underlying occupancy distribution is the same. However, this explanation makes only one prediction, that is, that with sufficient sampling, no relationship will be found to exist. This prediction is readily falsified, given that exceptionally well studied taxa such as breeding birds (e.g. Zuckerberg et al. 2009, Gaston) show well documented O-A relationships.

A second statistical explanation involves the use of statistical distributions such as the Poisson or negative-binomial. This explanation suggests that due to the underlying distribution of aggregation and density, and observed O–A relationship would be expected. However, Gaston et al. question whether this is a suitably mechanistic explanation. Indeed, Gaston et al. suggest that "to argue that spatial aggregation explains abundance-occupancy relationships is simply to supplant one poorly understood pattern with another".

The phylogenetic non-independence hypothesis is a third statistical explanation, specific to observed interspecific O–A relationships. This hypothesis suggests that, as closely related species are not truly independent their inclusion into analyses artificially inflates the degrees of freedom available for testing the relationship. However Gaston et al. cite several studies documenting significant O–A relationships in spite of controlling for phylogenetic non-independence.

=== Range position ===
Most evaluations of O–A relationships do not evaluate species over their entire (global) range, but document abundance and occupancy patterns within a specific region. It is believed that species decline in abundance and become more patchily distributed towards the margin of their range. If this is true, then it can be expected that as a species expands or contracts its range within the region of interest, it will more or less closely resemble populations at the core of its range, leading to a positive intraspecific O–A relationship. In the same manner, an assemblage of species within the study region can be expected to contain some species near the core and some near the periphery of their ranges, leading to a positive interspecific O–A relationship. Although this explanation may contribute to the understanding of O–A relationships where partial ranges are considered, it cannot explain relationships documented for entire geographic ranges.

=== Resource use explanations ===
Brown suggested that species with a broad ecological niche would, as a consequence, be able to obtain higher local densities, and a wider distribution than species with a narrow niche breadth. This relationship would generate a positive O-A relationship. In a similar manner, a species' niche position, (niche position represents the absolute distance between the mean environmental conditions where a species occurs and mean environmental conditions across a region) could influence its local abundance and range size, if species with lower niche position are more able to use resources typical of a region. Although intuitive, Gaston et al. and Gaston and Blackburn note that, due to the n-dimensional nature of the niche, this hypothesis is, in effect, untestable.

=== Density-dependent habitat selection ===
Many species exhibit density-dependent dispersal and habitat selection. For species exhibiting this pattern, dispersal into what would otherwise be sub-optimal habitats can occur when local abundances are high in high quality habitats (see Source–sink dynamics), thus increasing the size of the species geographic range. An initial argument against this hypothesis is that when a species colonizes formerly empty habitats, the average abundance of that species across all occupied habitats drops, negating an O–A relationship. However, all species will occur at low densities in some occupied habitats, while only the abundant species will be able to reach high densities in some of their occupied habitats. Thus it is expected that both common and uncommon species will have similar minimum densities in occupied habitats, but that it is the maximum densities obtained by common species in some habitats that drive the positive relationship between mean densities and AOO. If density-dependent habitat selection were to determine positive O–A relationships, the distribution of a species would follow an Ideal Free Distribution (IFD). Gaston et al. cites Tyler and Hargrove who examined the IFD using simulation models and found several instances (e.g. when resources had a fractal distribution, or when the scale of resource distribution poorly matched the organisms dispersal capabilities) where IFDs poorly described species distributions.

=== Metapopulation dynamics ===
In a classical metapopulation model, habitat occurs in discrete patches, with a population in any one patch facing a substantial risk of extinction at any given time. Because population dynamics in individual patches are asynchronous, the system is maintained by dispersal between patches (e.g. dispersal from patches with high populations can 'rescue' populations near or at extinction in other patches). Freckleton et al. have shown that, with a few assumptions (habitat patches of equal suitability, density-independent extinction, and restricted dispersal between patches), varying overall habitat suitability in a metapopulation can generate a positive intraspecific O-A relationship. However, there is currently debate regarding how many populations actually fit a classical metapopulation model. In experimental systems using moss-dwelling microarthropods showed that the fragmentation of habitat caused declines in abundance and occupancy. The addition of habitat corridors arrested these declines, providing evidence that metapopulation dynamics (extinction and immigration) maintain the interspecific O-A relationship, however, Warren and Gaston were able to detect a positive interspecific O–A relationship even in the absence of dispersal, indicating that a more general set of extinction and colonization processes (than metapopulation processes per se) may maintain the O–A relationship.

=== Vital rates ===
The vital rates of a species (in particular r – the intrinsic rate of increase; see Population dynamics) interact with the habitat quality of an occupied patch to determine local density, and in multiple patches, can result in an O–A relationship. Holt et al. modelled a system where dispersal between habitat patches could ensure that all suitable habitat patches were occupied, but where dispersal was sufficiently limited so that immigration did not significantly affect the population size in occupied patches. In this system the population size within any given habitat patch was a function only of birth and death rates. By causing habitat quality to vary (increasing or decreasing birth and death rates) Holt was able to generate a positive intraspecific O–A relationship. Holt et al.'s model requires many data to test even for intraspecific relationships (i.e. vital rates of all populations through time). Freckleton et al. use a version of the model proposed by Holt et al., but with varying habitat quality between patches to evaluate parameters that could be observed in species O–A data. Freckleton et al. show that aggregation of individuals within sites, and the skewness of population size should correlate with density and occupancy, depending on specific arrangements of habitat quality, and demonstrate that these parameters vary in accordance with positive intra- and interspecific O–A relationships for common farmland birds in Britain.

Figure 2. Holt et al.'s model under different Hcrit values. Figure 2 a. shows the effect of increasing the critical threshold for occupancy on population size and AOO. Figure 2b. shows the effect of decreasing Hcrit. Because the AOO and total abundance covary, an intraspecific occupancy abundance relationship is expected under situations where habitat quality varies through time (more or less area above Hcrit.

== Explaining the occupancy–abundance relationship ==
Most of the different explanations that have been forwarded to explain the regularities in species abundance and geographic distribution mentioned above similarly predict a positive distribution–abundance relationship. This makes it difficult to test the validity of each explanation. A key challenge is therefore to distinguish between the various mechanisms that have been proposed to underlie these near universal patterns. The effect of either niche dynamics or neutral dynamics represent two opposite views and many explanations take up intermediate positions.

Neutral dynamics assume species and habitats are equivalent and patterns in species abundance and distribution arise from stochastic occurrences of birth, death, immigration, extinction and speciation. Modelling this type of dynamics can simulate many of the patterns in species abundance including a positive occupancy–abundance relationship. This does not necessarily imply niche differences among species are not important; being able to accurately model real life patterns does not mean that the model assumptions also reflect the actual mechanisms underlying these real-life patterns. In fact, occupancy–abundance relationship are generated across many species, without taking into account the identity of a species. Therefore, it may not be too surprising that neutral models can accurately describe these community properties.

Niche dynamics assume differences among species in their fundamental niche which should give rise to patterns in the abundance and distribution of species (i.e. their realized niches). In this framework, the abundance and distribution of a single species and hence the emergent patterns across multiple species, are driven by causal mechanisms operating at the level of that species. Therefore, examining how differences between individual species shape these patterns, rather than analyzing the pattern itself, may help to understand these patterns.

By incorporating specific information on a species' diet, reproduction, dispersal and habitat specialisation Verberk et al. could successfully explain the contribution of individual species to the overall relationship and they showed that the main mechanisms in operation may be different for different species groups.

Neutral dynamics may be relatively important in some cases, depending on the species, environmental conditions and the spatial and temporal scale level under consideration, whereas in other circumstances, niche dynamics may dominate. Thus niche and neutral dynamics may be operating simultaneously, constituting different endpoints of the same continuum.

== Implications ==
Important implications of both the intra- and interspecific O–A relationships are discussed by Gaston et al.

== Importance of the intraspecific O–A relationship ==
1. Indexing abundance – Documenting the abundance of a species is a resource-intensive, and time-consuming process. However, if the abundance of a species can be estimated from its AOO, then assessments of population size can be made more rapidly. This assumption underlies the use of range sizes when deciding on the conservation status of a species (see IUCN Red List), and has led to debate over whether the EOO or AOO measure of species range is more appropriate (Gaston and Fuller 2009). For example, Zuckerberg et al. (2009) have demonstrated that for breeding birds in New York, most species that underwent changes in abundance (positive or negative) between 1985 and 2005 showed concurrent changes in range size. Using a dipswitch test with 15 criteria, Hui et al. (2009) examined the ability of eight models of this kind to estimate the abundance of 610 southern African bird species. Models based on the scaling pattern of occupancy (i.e., those that reflect the scale dependence of species range size) produced the most reliable abundance estimates, and therefore are recommended for assemblage-scale regional abundance estimation.
2. Setting harvest rates – Especially in the case of commercial fisheries, the proportion of the total population of a species expected to be captured at a given effort is expected to increase as range size decreases. Given a positive intraspecific O–A relationship, it would be expected that with decreases in abundance there would be a decrease in range size, further increasing the potential for overharvesting.
3. Conservation biology – The existence of positive intraspecific O–A relationships would exacerbate the risks faced by imperilled species. Not only would reductions in range size and number of sites occupied directly increase the threat of extinction, but extinction risk would be further increased by the concurrent decline in abundance.

== Importance of the interspecific O–A relationship ==
1. Biodiversity inventory – An interspecific O–A relationship implies that those species that have a restricted distribution (and hence will be important for conservation reasons) will also have low abundance within their range. Thus, when it is especially important that a species be detected, that species may be difficult to detect. Gaston et al. note that because of this relationship, the intensiveness of a sampling scheme cannot be traded off for extensiveness. In effect, an intensive survey of a few sites will miss species with restricted distribution occurring at other sites, while a low-intensity extensive survey will miss species with low densities across most sites.
2. Conservation – As with the intraspecific relationship, the interspecific O–A relationship implies that species will not only be at risk of extinction due to low abundance, but because species with low abundance are expected to have restricted distributions, they are at risk of local catastrophe leading to global extinction. This may be confounded by the difficulty in surveying locally rare species due to both their low detectability and restricted distribution (see above). Finally, because rare species are expected to have restricted distributions, conservation programmes aimed at prioritizing sites for multi-species conservation will include fewer habitats for rare species than common species.
3. Invasive species – In essence, the logic relating positive O–A relationships to invasion biology is the same as that relating O–A relationships to conservation concerns. Specifically, as an invading species increases in local abundance, its range can be expected to expand, further confounding control efforts.

== See also ==
- Body size-species richness
- Conservation biology
- Ideal free distribution
- Metabolic theory of ecology
- Niche apportionment models
- Relative species abundance
