= Xylophragma =

Scientific classification
- Kingdom: Plantae
- Clade: Tracheophytes
- Clade: Angiosperms
- Clade: Eudicots
- Clade: Asterids
- Order: Lamiales
- Family: Bignoniaceae
- Tribe: Bignonieae
- Genus: Xylophragma; Sprague

Species
- See text

Synonyms
- List: Heterocalycium Rauschert; Orthotheca Pichon; Rojasiophyton Hassl.

Genus of flowering plants

Xylophragma is a genus of flowering plants in the family Bignoniaceae, native to dry forests of Mexico, Central America, Trinidad and northern South America. They are lianas or scandent shrubs.

== Species ==
Currently accepted species include:

- Xylophragma harleyi (A.H.Gentry ex M.M.Silva & L.P.Queiroz) L.G.Lohmann
- Xylophragma heterocalyx (Bureau & K.Schum.) A.H.Gentry
- Xylophragma myrianthum (Cham.) Sprague
- Xylophragma platyphyllum (DC.) L.G.Lohmann
- Xylophragma pratense (Bureau & K.Schum.) Sprague
- Xylophragma seemannianum (Kuntze) Sandwith
- Xylophragma tenue Kaehler
- Xylophragma unifoliolatum J.F.Morales & Q.Jiménez
