= Lawrencia spicata =

Scientific classification
- Kingdom: Plantae
- Clade: Tracheophytes
- Clade: Angiosperms
- Clade: Eudicots
- Clade: Rosids
- Order: Malvales
- Family: Malvaceae
- Genus: Lawrencia
- Species: L. spicata

Binomial name
- Lawrencia spicata Hook., 1840
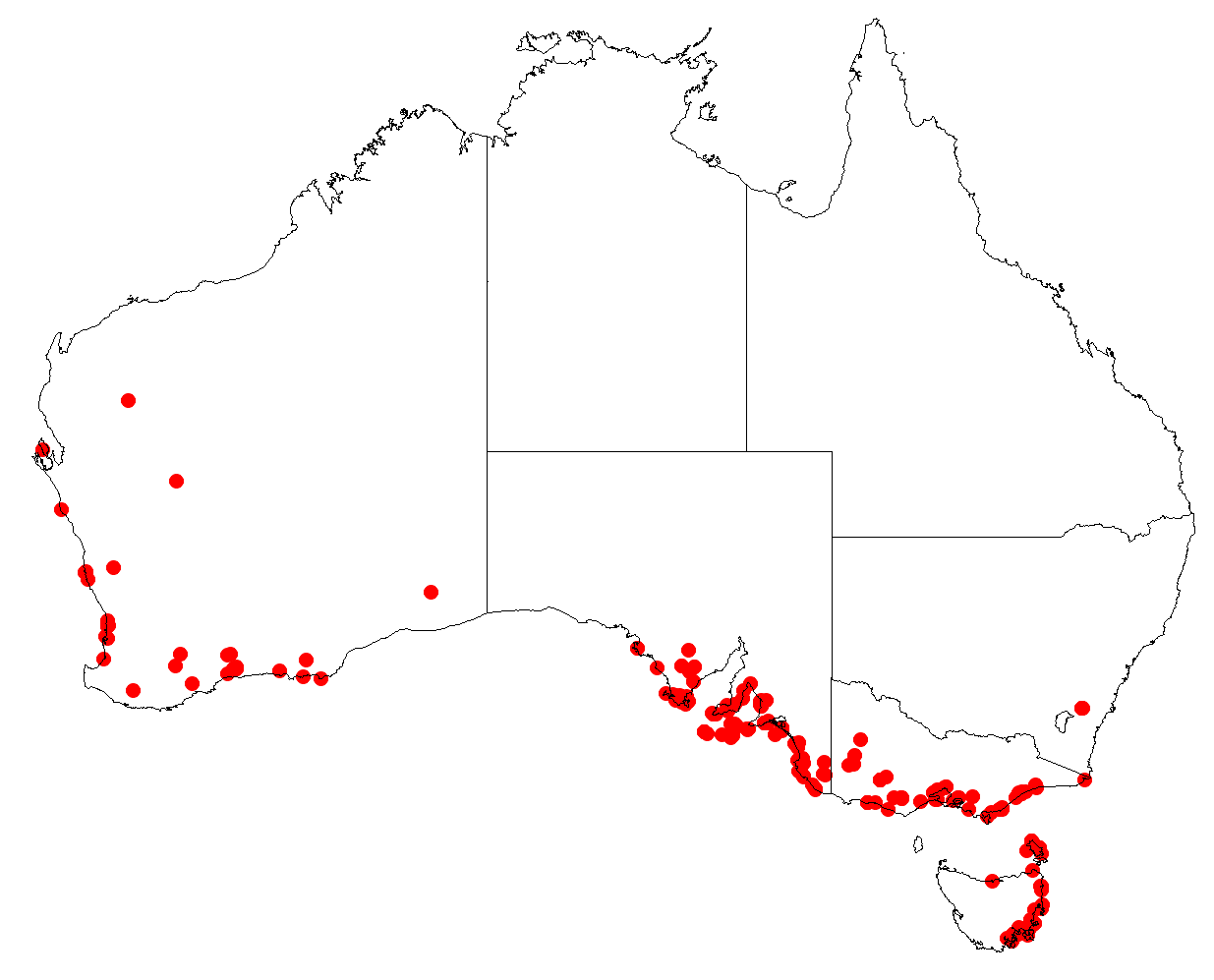
- Occurrence data from AVH

Species of plant

Lawrencia spicata, commonly known as salt lawrencia, is a species of plant in the mallow family, Malvaceae. It is endemic to Australia where it is recorded from the states of Western Australia, South Australia, Victoria and New South Wales. Its preferred habitats are coastal saltmarsh, estuaries, river banks and the margins of salt lakes. It is a perennial herb, with fleshy stems and leaves forming a basal rosette from which ascends a dense cylindrical flowering spike, up to 60 cm in height. The leaves are 2–7 cm long with extended stalks. The flowers are white or yellow and have a strong smell.
