= Cornukaempferia larsenii =

Scientific classification
- Kingdom: Plantae
- Clade: Tracheophytes
- Clade: Angiosperms
- Clade: Monocots
- Clade: Commelinids
- Order: Zingiberales
- Family: Zingiberaceae
- Genus: Cornukaempferia
- Species: C. larsenii

Binomial name
- Cornukaempferia larsenii P.Saensouk

Species of flowering plant

Cornukaempferia larsenii is a species in the ginger family, Zingiberaceae. It was first described by Piyaporn Saensouk.

It is named after Danish botanist Kai Larsen.

== Range ==
Cornukaempferia larsenii is native to Thailand and Laos.
