= Kaisupeea =

Scientific classification
- Kingdom: Plantae
- Clade: Embryophytes
- Clade: Tracheophytes
- Clade: Spermatophytes
- Clade: Angiosperms
- Clade: Eudicots
- Clade: Asterids
- Order: Lamiales
- Family: Gesneriaceae
- Genus: Kaisupeea; B.L.Burtt (2001)

Genus of flowering plants

Kaisupeea is a genus of flowering plants belonging to the family Gesneriaceae.

Its native range is Indo-China. It is found in Myanmar and Thailand.

The genus name of Kaisupeea is in honour of Supee Saksuwan Larsen (b. 1939) and her husband Kai Larsen (1926–2012), a Danish botanist. it was first described and published in Nordic J. Bot. Vol.21 on page 116 in 2001.

== Known species ==
According to Kew:

- Kaisupeea cyanea B.L.Burtt
- Kaisupeea herbacea (C.B.Clarke) B.L.Burtt
- Kaisupeea orthocarpa B.L.Burtt
