= Cornukaempferia =

Scientific classification
- Kingdom: Plantae
- Clade: Tracheophytes
- Clade: Angiosperms
- Clade: Monocots
- Clade: Commelinids
- Order: Zingiberales
- Family: Zingiberaceae
- Subfamily: Zingiberoideae
- Tribe: Zingibereae
- Genus: Cornukaempferia; Mood & K.Larsen

Type species
- Cornukaempferia aurantiflora Mood & K.Larsen

Genus of flowering plants

Cornukaempferia is a genus of plants in the ginger family. It contains three known species, all endemic to Thailand.

- Cornukaempferia aurantiflora Mood & K.Larsen
- Cornukaempferia larsenii P.Saensouk
- Cornukaempferia longipetiolata Mood & K.Larsen
