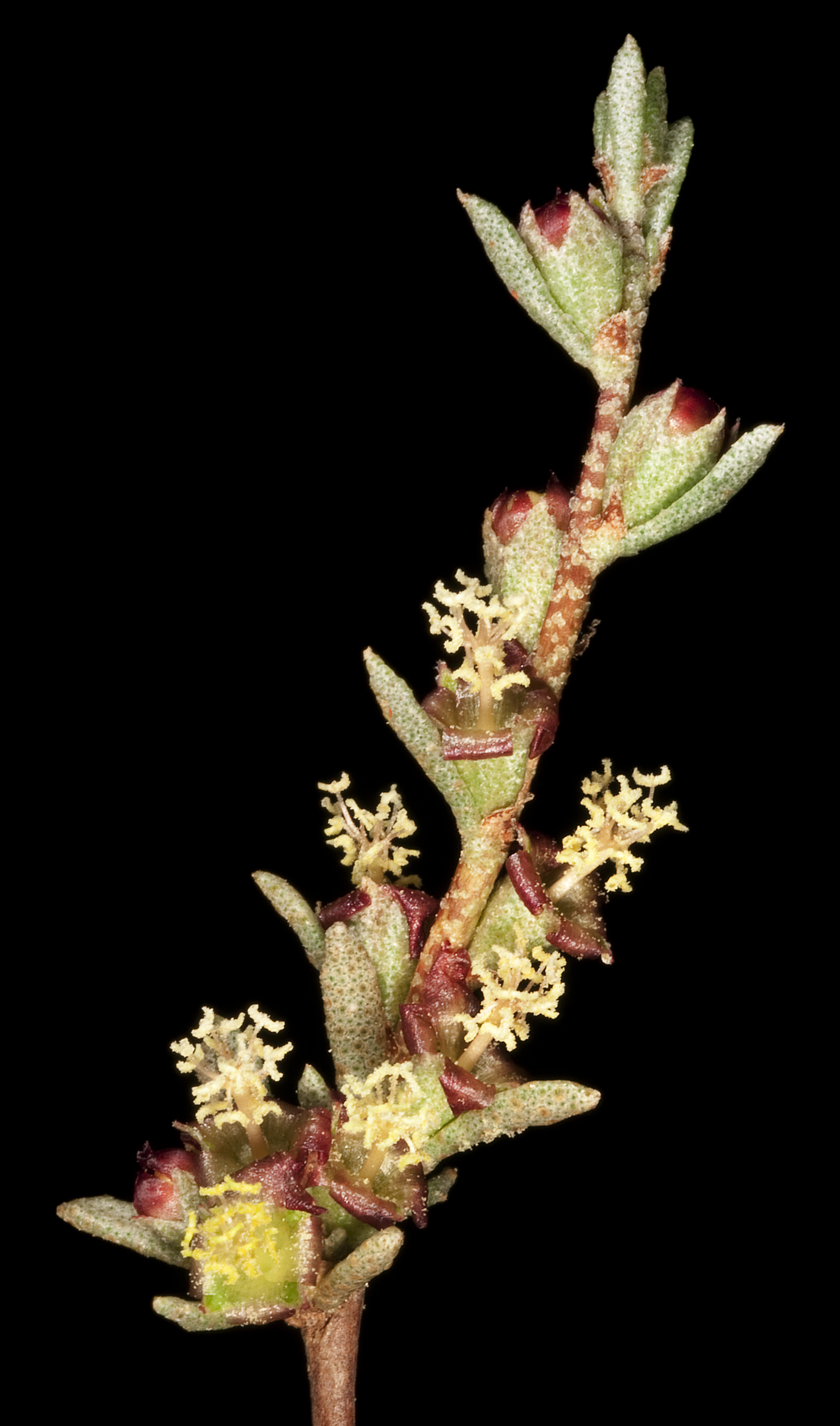
- Lawrencia squamata

Scientific classification
- Kingdom: Plantae
- Clade: Tracheophytes
- Clade: Angiosperms
- Clade: Eudicots
- Clade: Rosids
- Order: Malvales
- Family: Malvaceae
- Subfamily: Malvoideae
- Tribe: Malveae
- Genus: Lawrencia; Hook.

Species
- See text.

Synonyms
- Selenothamnus Melville

= Lawrencia =

Genus of flowering plants in the mallow family

Lawrencia is a plant genus in the family Malvaceae. The genus is endemic to Australia.

== Systematics ==
Species include:

- Lawrencia berthae (F.Muell.) Melville – Showy Lawrencia
- Lawrencia buchananensis Lander
- Lawrencia chrysoderma Lander
- Lawrencia cinerea Lander
- Lawrencia densiflora (Baker f.) Melville
- Lawrencia diffusa (Benth.) Melville
- Lawrencia glomerata Hook. – Clustered Lawrencia
- Lawrencia helmsii (F.Muell. & Tate) Lander – Dunna Dunna
- Lawrencia incana (J.M.Black) Melville
- Lawrencia repens (S.Moore) Melville
- Lawrencia spicata Hook. – Salt Lawrencia
- Lawrencia squamata Nees – Thorny Lawrencia
- Lawrencia viridigrisea Lander
