= Alciope (mythology) =

In Greek mythology, Alciope may refer to the three different characters:

- Alciope, the nymph-mother Celmisius. In this capacity, she was probably the Alciope who bore to Cronus the Dactyls, one of which Celmis was named.
- Alciope, one of Apollo's lovers, and the mother of Linus.
- Alciope, the supposed name of Alciopus' daughter. She was one of Heracles's numerous lovers.
