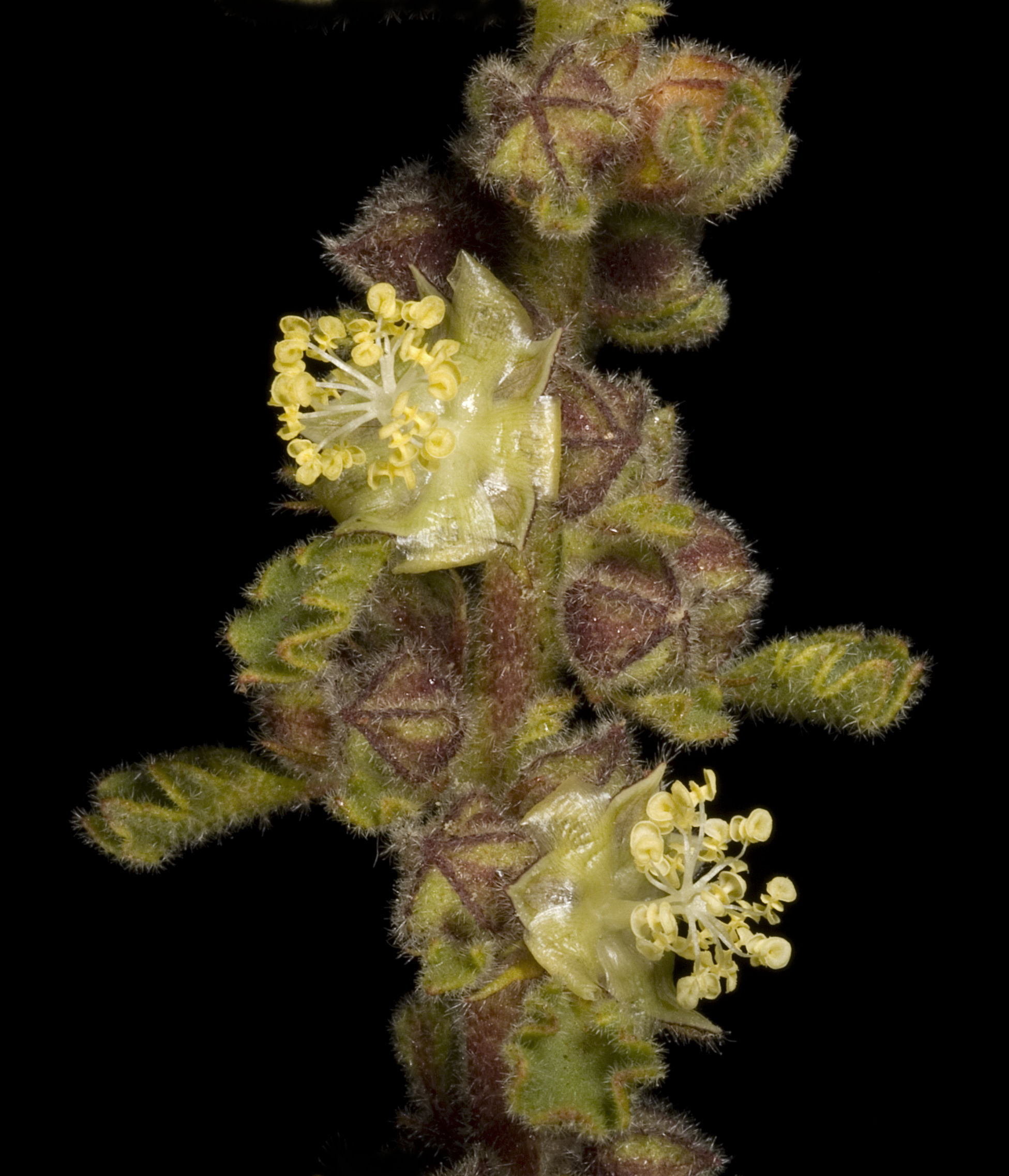

Scientific classification
- Kingdom: Plantae
- Clade: Tracheophytes
- Clade: Angiosperms
- Clade: Eudicots
- Clade: Rosids
- Order: Malvales
- Family: Malvaceae
- Genus: Lawrencia
- Species: L. densiflora

Binomial name
- Lawrencia densiflora (Baker f.) Melville
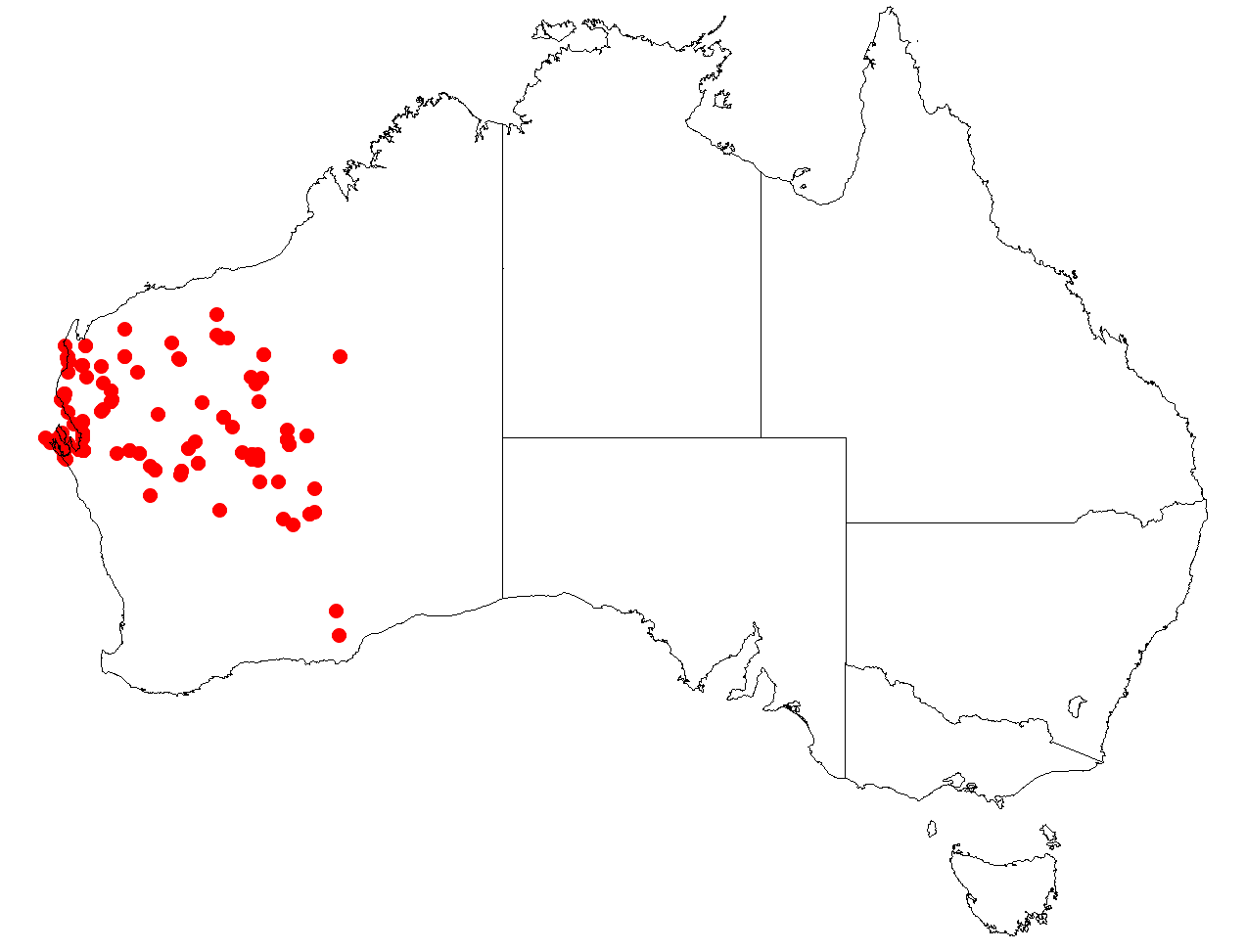
- Occurrence data from AVH

Synonyms
- Plagianthus densiflorus Baker f.

= Lawrencia densiflora =

Species of flowering plant

Lawrencia densiflora is a species of plant in the mallow family, Malvaceae. It is endemic to Western Australia.

== Description ==
L. densiflora is a perennial shrub/herb, growing to a height from 0.07 to 0.6 m. The stems are hairy. The leaves are irregularly lobed, 10 to 40 mm long and 5 to 20 mm wide, with stellate hairs. The flowers have both a calyx and a corolla, and are yellow to cream and seen between July and October.

== Habitat ==
It grows on limestone and sandy or clayey soils, and is found in dry watercourses, claypans, salty depressions and limestone ridges.

== Distribution ==
It is found in Beard's Eremaean Province and in the IBRA regions of Carnarvon, Gascoyne, Little Sandy Desert, Murchison, Pilbara and Yalgoo.

== Taxonomy ==
L. densiflora was first described as Plagianthus densiflorus by Baker in 1892, and in 1967, was redescribed by Melville who assigned it to the genus, Lawrencia, with the plant thereby becoming Lawrencia densiflora.
