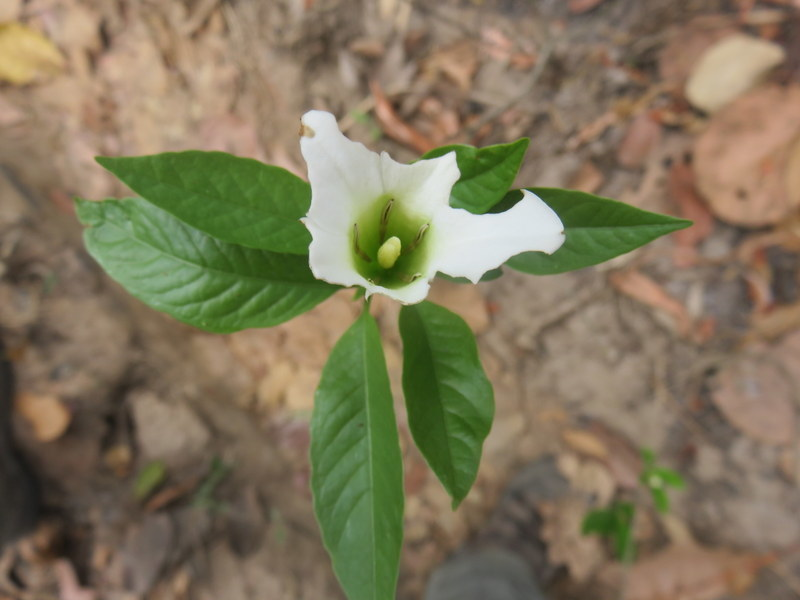

Scientific classification
- Kingdom: Plantae
- Clade: Embryophytes
- Clade: Tracheophytes
- Clade: Angiosperms
- Clade: Eudicots
- Clade: Asterids
- Order: Gentianales
- Family: Rubiaceae
- Subfamily: Ixoroideae
- Tribe: Gardenieae
- Genus: Kailarsenia; Tirveng.

Species
- Kailarsenia campanula (Ridl.) Tirveng.; Kailarsenia godefroyana (Kuntze) Tirveng.; Kailarsenia hygrophila (Kurz) Tirveng.; Kailarsenia lineata (Craib) Tirveng.; Kailarsenia stenosepala (Merr.) Tirveng.; Kailarsenia tentaculata (Hook.f.) Tirveng.

= Kailarsenia =

Genus of flowering plants in the coffee family

Kailarsenia is a genus of flowering plants in the tribe Gardenieae of the family Rubiaceae. Its native range is Indo-China to West Malesia.

Kailarsenia belongs to the "Gardenia" clade, together with Aoranthe pro parte, Ceriscoides, Coddia, Gardenia, and Genipa.

The genus name Kailarsenia is a taxonomic patronym honoring Kai Larsen, professor of botany at Århus University, Denmark. The closely related genus Larsenaikia has been named as a taxonomic anagram derived from Kailarsenia.
