= Kai Larsen =

Danish botanist of the 20th-21st centuries

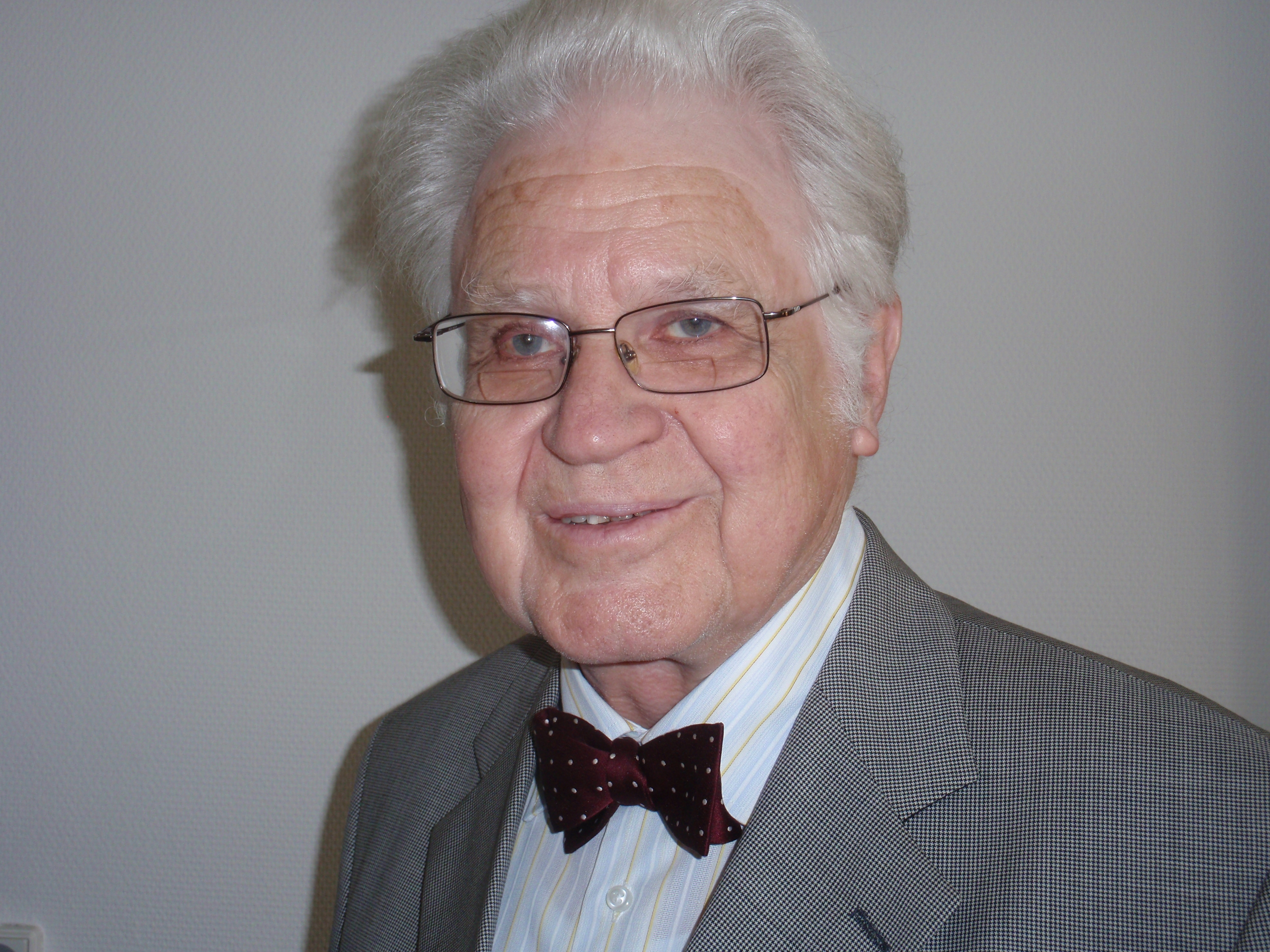
- Born: November 15, 1925; Hillerød, Denmark
- Died: August 23, 2012 (aged 86); Denmark
- Scientific career
- Fields: Botany

Kai Larsen (15 November 1926 in Hillerød – 23 August 2012) was a Danish botanist.

Kai Larsen was professor of botany (Emeritus from 1-12-1996) at Århus University, Denmark. He was the Danish editor of Flora Nordica, editor of Flora of Thailand, advisor to Flora of China and executive member of Flora Malesiana.

He edited several exsiccatae, among others Flora Germanica exsiccata Schleswig-Holstein.

He was a member of the Norwegian Academy of Science and Letters. and the Royal Danish Academy of Sciences and Letters.

The standard author abbreviation K.Larsen is used to indicate this person as the author when citing a botanical name.

== Research ==
- SE Asian flora region, particularly Thailand, Malaysia and Indo-China. Revisions of several families e. g. Caesalpiniaceae, Caryophyllaceae, and Lowiaceae for several of the regional floras.
- Zingiberaceae for Flora of Thailand and Flora Malesiana.

== Eponymous species ==
Some plant names are taxonomic patronyms recognizing his contribution to studying Asian flora.

=== Genera ===
- Kailarsenia: a genus in the family Rubiaceae found in Southeast Asia.
- Larsenaikia: a genus in the family Rubiaceae endemic to Australia. This name is a taxonomic anagram derived from genus Kailarsenia.
- The generic name Kaisupeea B.L. Burtt (Gesneriaceae) honours Kai and Supee Larsen.

=== Species ===
- Burmannia larseniana D.X.Zhang & R.M.K.Saunders (Burmanniaceae)
- Bauhinia larsenii Y.F. Chen & D.X. Zhang, fossil Leguminosae from southern China
- Caulokaempferia larsenii Suksathan & Triboun
- Cornukaempferia larsenii Saensouk, Theerakulpisut, & Chantaranothai
- Curcuma larsenii C. Maknoi & T. Jenjittikul
- Impatiens larsenii T. Shimizu
- Kaempferia larsenii Sirirugsa
- Mouretia larsenii Tange
- Zingiber larsenii Theilade
