= On Nature's Trail =

1978 American television show

On Nature's Trail is a television show produced by the Maryland Center for Public Broadcasting in 1978. The show featured Elmer and Jean Worthley observing and discussing plants growing at different locations in Baltimore County, Maryland. Observations were made at the same locations during the spring, summer and fall.

== Episodes ==
- 1. Swamp in Spring (arrowwood, calamus, cinnamon fern, poison sumac, red maple, silky dogwood, skunk cabbage, smooth alder, sphagnum moss, spicebush, swamp highbush blueberry, Turk's-cap lily, tussock sedge)
- 2. Serpentine Barren in Spring (beard grass, bird's-foot violet, blue-eyed grass, bluets, British soldiers (lichen), broom moss, cinquefoil, cushion moss, ebony spleenwort, field chickweed, gray shield lichen, holy grass, Indian grass, lyre-leaved rockcress, pixie cups (lichen), purple ceratodon (moss), reindeer lichen, sagittate-leaved violet, urn fungus, Virginia pine, wrinkled shield lichen)
- 3. Stream in Spring (Carex crinita (sedge), Christmas fern, cinnamon fern, false hellebore, false Solomon's seal, golden saxifrage, Indian cucumber, lady fern, liverwort, May apple, rattlesnake fern, shining club moss, silvery spleenwort, skunk cabbage, royal fern, stinging nettle, tulip tree flower)
- 4. Woods in Spring (beech, chestnut oak, fungus on laurel leaf, hay-scented fern, lion's-foot, maple-leaved viburnum, mountain laurel, partridge berry, polypody fern, red-backed salamander, trailing arbutus, Virginia creeper, wild azalea, wild sarsaparilla, Wissahickon schist, witch hazel)
- 5. Woodsy Stream in Spring (black gum, common elder or elderberry, cross vine, deer's tongue panic grass, fragile or brittle fern, green ash, hairy cap moss, Higan cherry, hill Senecio, hispid buttercup, hog peanut, Jack-in-the-pulpit, jewel weed, lady fern, oak daedalia, red maple, wild lily-of-the-valley, wool sower gall)
- 6. Pasture Field in Spring (bulbous buttercup, common speedwell, daisy, field hawkweed, horse nettle, Kentucky bluegrass, multiflora rose, pasture thistle, puffball, pussytoes, spittlebug, sweet vernal grass, wild strawberry, yarrow)
- 7. Railroad Track in Spring (bouncing bet, butter-and-eggs, common horsetail, common milkweed, dock, downy brome grass, evening lychnis, milk snake, mullein, pennycress, peppergrass, reed canary grass, spiderwort, spreading dogbane, Venus' looking-glass, viper's bugloss, wintercress, yellow sweet clover)
- 8. Roadside in Spring (asparagus beetle, bagworm, bedstraw, black medick, black willow, box elder, coltsfoot, common ragweed, dandelion, dodder, giant ragweed, Japanese honeysuckle, northern weasel, perfoliate tearthumb, poison ivy, rough bluegrass, sheep fescue, Virginia creeper, white mulberry, wild asparagus, wild lettuce, wild yam)
- 9. Pond in Summer (alder, ants, bur reed, cardinal flower, cattail, duckweed, green frogs, heal-all, meadow beauty, pickerel weed, pink lotus, rattlebox, sedges, spreading goldenrod, swamp milkweed, water clover (fern), water lily, water plantain, wooly aphids, yellow iris)
- 10. Hedgerow in Summer (black gum, black oak, black sweet cherry, black wild raspberry, flowering dogwood, greenbrier, Japanese honeysuckle, multiflora rose, pignut hickory, pin oak, red sweet cherry, sassafras, slippery elm, staghorn sumac, wax cherry, white mulberry, yellow sweet cherry, yellow wild raspberry)
- 11. Old Field in Summer (agrimony, black cherry, Canada goldenrod, clammy everlasting, dogbane, early goldenrod, horse nettle, orchard grass, pennyroyal, poison ivy, purple-top, Queen Anne's lace, white mulberry, wild lettuce, yarrow)
- 12. Swamp in Summer (arrow-leaved tearthumb, blue vervain, broad-leaved arrowhead, cinnamon fern, dodder, ironweed, joe pye weed, marsh harebell, poison sumac, rice cut grass, skunk cabbage, sphagnum, St. Johnswort, Turk's-cap lily, winterberry holly)
- 13. Serpentine Barren in Summer (blackjack oak, blazing star, blue-eyed grass, British soldiers (lichen), field chickweed, flameflower, gerardia, gray goldenrod, Indian grass, lyre-leaved rockcress, monarch butterfly, orangeweed, partridge pea, pixie cup, post oak, reindeer lichen, Sabatia, slender knotweed, slender ladies' tresses, sundrops, three-awn grass, turkey-foot beard grass, Virginia pine, whorled milkwort, yellow flax)
- 14. Fire Ecology (box turtle, Canada thistle, carpetweed, catnip, dandelion, field basil, hawkweed, heal-all, late goldenrod, orchard grass, purpletop grass, spoon moss, tall goldenrod, three-seeded mercury, timothy-grass)
- 15. Woods in Summer (American chestnut, beech, black gum, chestnut oak, Christmas fern, cicadas, hay-scented fern, Indian cucumber, marginal shield fern, mountain laurel, New York fern, partridgeberry, pinxter flower, polypody fern, rattlesnake orchid, shadbush, slime mold, spiny-bellied spider, spotted wintergreen, tickle grass, trailing arbutus, Virginia creeper, witch hazel)
- 16. Multiflora Rose Hedge (bittersweet, bobwhite, bush honeysuckle, catbird, coral honeysuckle, fox grape, Franklinia, golden garden spider, horse nettle, Japanese honeysuckle, Japanese silverberry, mocking bird, multiflora rose, nimblewill, perfoliate tearthumb, ragweed, thistle, virgin's bower)
- 17. Vacant Lot (Ailanthus altissima, barnyard grass, bird's nest fungi, chicory, climbing false buckwheat, cocklebur, common ragweed, evening primrose, Faber's bristlegrass, forking panic grass, hedge bindweed, Indian mallow, Jimson weed, Korean lespedezea, lamb's quarters, Queen Anne's lace, wild lettuce, yellow goat's beard, yellow wood-sorrel)
- 18. Pond in Fall (bluejay, boneset, bur-reed, cardinal flower, goldenrod, ironweed, joe-pye weed, meadow-beauty, nodding ladies' tresses, purple-stemmed aster, red maple, rush, sedge, spreading goldenrod, wooly aphid)
- 19. Serpentine Barren in Fall (blackhaw, blackjack oak, bluejay, burnet, chinquapin oak, fringed gentian, golden garden spider, inchworm, Indian grass, longhorn grasshopper, new Belgian aster, ninebark, post oak, scrub pine, small-flowered white aster, spike moss, sycamore, ten-petaled sunflower, turkey vulture, yellowjacket)
- 20. Old Orchard (apple, blackberry, Chinese chestnut, deer's tongue panic grass, early goldenrod, fox grape meadow mushroom, Norway maple, orchard grass, Perilla, poison ivy, pokeweed, riverbank grape, sensitive fern, smooth sumac, Virginia creeper, white avens, wood nymph butterfly)
- 21. Swamp in Fall (American holly, arrowwood, cinnamon fern, crayfish, fern-leaf moss, holly leaf miner, holly leaf spot, joe-pye weed, mnium moss, pilose aster, poison sumac, red maple, silky dogwood, skunk cabbage, smooth alder, song sparrow, sphagnum moss, spreading goldenrod, swamp highbush blueberry, Turk's-cap lily, tussock sedge, winterberry holly)
- 22. Stream in Fall (Christmas fern, clearweed, enchanter's nightshade, false Solomon's seal, fringed loosestrife, hog peanut, horse balm, jewelweed, liverwort, pileated woodpecker, shining club moss, tick trefoil, tulip tree, turtlehead, Virginia knotweed)
- 23. Railroad in Fall (ball goldenrod gall, bouncing bet, butter-and-eggs, common blue violet, common milkweed, great Solomon's seal, jumping spider, pennycress, spindle goldenrod gall, spreading dogbane, swamp rose, swamp white oak, tick trefoil, wintercress, wooly bear caterpillar)
- 24. Roadside in Fall (bagworm, barnyard grass, bedstraw, black-eyed Susan, black willow, box elder, clearweed, coltsfoot, common milkweed, forked panic grass, giant ragweed, jewelweed, perfoliate tearthumb, poison ivy, purple-stemmed aster, rough bluegrass, swamp milkweed, white aster, white mulberry, wild asparagus, wild lettuce, wild yam)
- 25. Woods in Fall (Christmas fern, greenbrier, huckleberry, marginal wood fern, mountain laurel, New York fern, partridge berry, pileated woodpecker, polypody, rattlesnake plantain, slime mold, spotted wintergreen, wild lily-of-the-valley)
- 26. Stone Wall (black walnut, Boston ivy, chipmunk, ebony spleenwort, English ivy, gray squirrel, jumping spider, nimblewill)

== Pamphlet ==
An accompanying pamphlet was designed and illustrated by Stephen Doyle. Sketches of some of the plants seen on these weekly walks are included in this booklet.

== Recordings ==
Several episodes have been digitized and are available in the digital collections at the University of Maryland.
