= Franklin High School (Reisterstown, Maryland) =

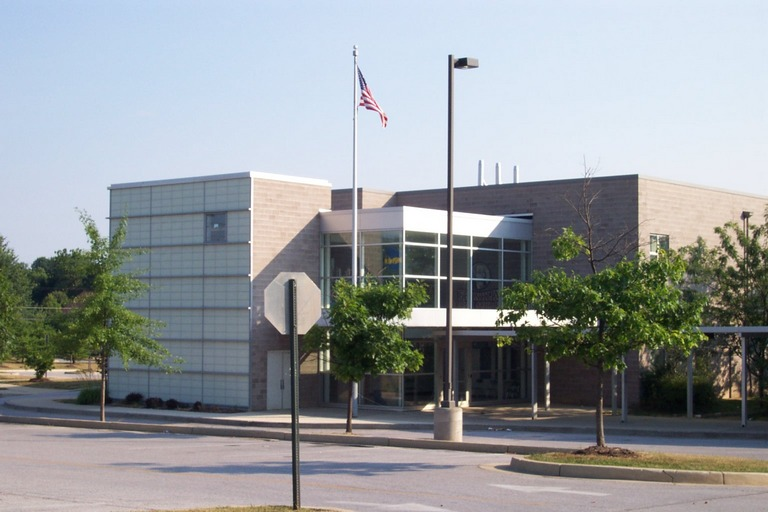

Location
- 12000 Reisterstown Road; Reisterstown, Maryland 21136; United States; 39°26′51″N 76°49′1″W

Information
- Type: Public Secondary
- Established: 1821/1848/1874/1896
- School district: Baltimore County Public Schools
- NCES School ID: 240012000390
- Principal: Kieran O'Connell
- Teaching staff: 94.00 (on an FTE basis)
- Grades: 9–12
- Enrollment: 1,493 (2023–2024)
- Student to teacher ratio: 15.88
- Campus: Suburban
- Colors: Red, and Blue
- Mascot: Indian
- Website: https://franklinhs.bcps.org/

Franklin High School is a public high school in Reisterstown, Baltimore County, Maryland, United States. Part of the Baltimore County Public Schools system, it is located near the intersection of Franklin Boulevard and Reisterstown Road.

== Background ==
Franklin High was established as Franklin Academy, a private school, by an act of the Maryland General Assembly that appointed its trustees on January 10, 1820; the school began operations in 1821. The school went public in 1848, but was not completely under public control until 1874. Its name was then temporarily changed to the "Reisterstown High School".

By 1896, the name of the school was changed back to reflect its earlier heritage, that of "Franklin High School". It is to be considered the oldest high school in the now Baltimore County Public Schools system, and one of the oldest in the Baltimore metropolitan area and the State.

Before this time, in most of the county, prospective students who passed the level of grammar (or elementary) school were able to travel into the central City of Baltimore if they wanted to continue on into public high schools.

The original Franklin Academy private school building was built on Cockeys Mill Road, where the Reisterstown branch of the Baltimore County Public Library is now located. In 1905, a new building was built for the public high school, leaving the old academy building to be used for the elementary school, the now developing system of the Baltimore County Public Schools. An additional building was built in 1914, and another in 1930 to house the growing student population. Of these three buildings, only the 1914/1930 brick structure still stands on Main Street in Reisterstown, currently housing Franklin Middle School. Franklin High School was moved to a more modern building in 1960 about a mile down the road, where it remains to this day. Since 1960, two additions have been built, the most recent in 2000 to deal with the increasing severe overcrowding.

== Academics ==
Franklin High school received a 51.6 out of a possible 90 points (57%) on the 2018-2019 Maryland State Department of Education Report Card and received a 3 out of 5 star rating, ranking in the 42nd percentile among all Maryland schools.

== Students ==
The 2023–2024 enrollment at Franklin High School was 1,493 students. The racial makeup of the school is 43.7% Black, 23.5% Hispanic, 20.8% White, 6.8% Asian, 0.5% other, and 4.8% two or more races.

== Athletics ==
Franklin High School has won the following State Championships:

=== State championships ===
Football

- Class 3A 2013, 2014, 2018

Boys Basketball

- Class B 1948

Girls Indoor Track

- 3A 2015, 2017, 2018

Wrestling

- 2A-1A 1999

Baseball

- Class A 1985

Softball

- Eugene Robertson Sportsmanship Award 2008

== Notable alumni ==
- Tre Avery – college and professional football cornerback.
- Moose Haas – former professional baseball player who pitched in the Major Leagues from 1976 to 1987.
- Amit Mehta – U.S. federal judge.
- Thomas Rowe Price Jr. – founder of the company T. Rowe Price.
- Nancy R. Stocksdale – member of the Maryland House of Delegates.
- Ovington Weller (1862–1947) – member of the U.S. Senate.
- Jean Worthley – naturalist and former host of Hodgepodge Lodge and On Nature's Trail.
