= Mitchelleae =

Scientific classification
- Kingdom: Plantae
- Clade: Tracheophytes
- Clade: Angiosperms
- Clade: Eudicots
- Clade: Asterids
- Order: Gentianales
- Family: Rubiaceae
- Subfamily: Rubioideae
- Tribe: Mitchelleae; Razafim. & B.Bremer & Manen

Tribe of flowering plants

Mitchelleae is a tribe of flowering plants in the family Rubiaceae and contains 14 species in 2 genera. Its representatives are found from temperate eastern Asia, and from eastern Canada to Guatemala.

== Genera ==
Currently accepted names

- Damnacanthus C.F.Gaertn. (12 sp)
- Mitchella L. (2 sp)

Synonyms

- Baumannia DC. = Damnacanthus
- Chamaedaphne Mitch. = Mitchella
- Disperma J.F.Gmel. = Mitchella
- Geoherpum Willd. = Mitchella
- Perdicesca Prov. = Mitchella
- Tetraplasia Rehder = Damnacanthus
