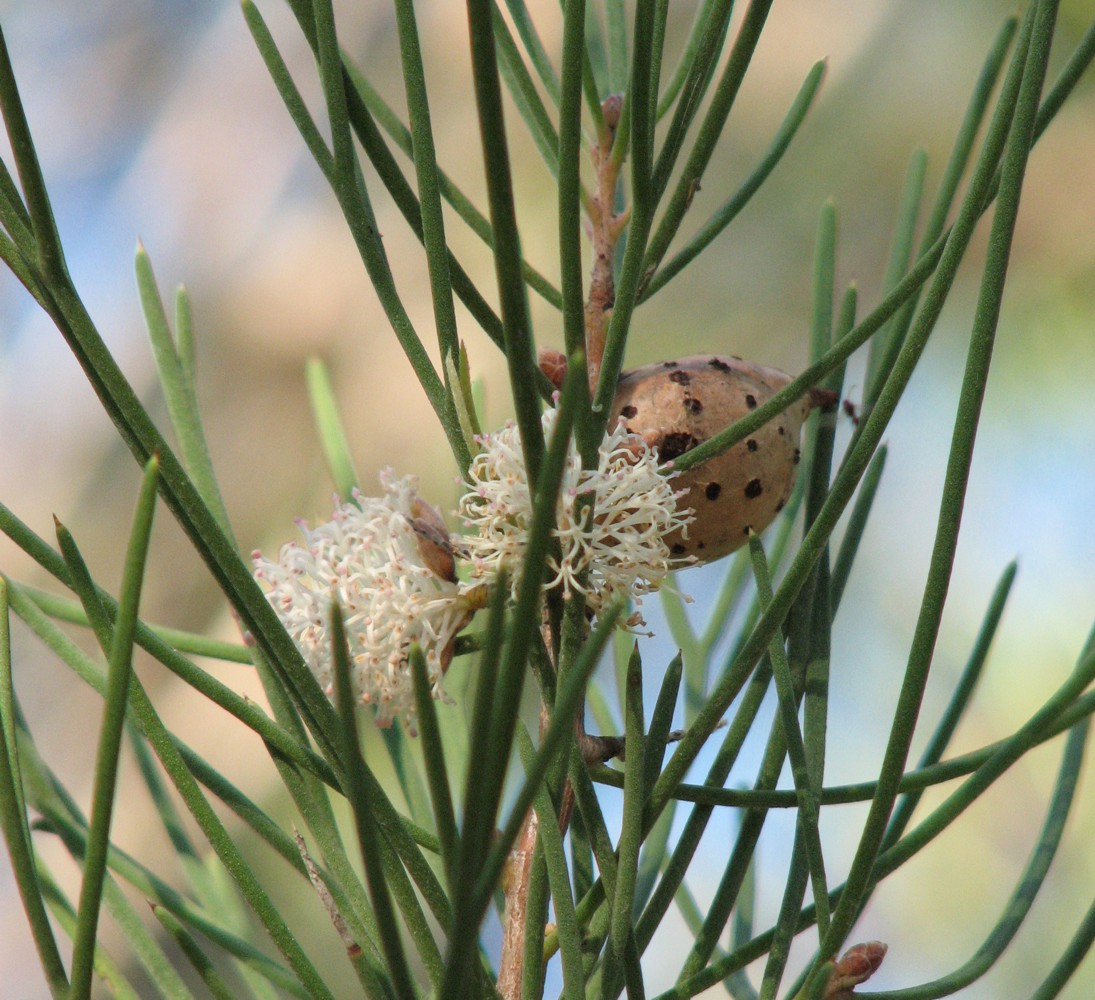

Scientific classification
- Kingdom: Plantae
- Clade: Tracheophytes
- Clade: Angiosperms
- Clade: Eudicots
- Order: Proteales
- Family: Proteaceae
- Genus: Hakea
- Species: H. drupacea

Binomial name
- Hakea drupacea (C.F.Gaertn.) Roem. & Schult.
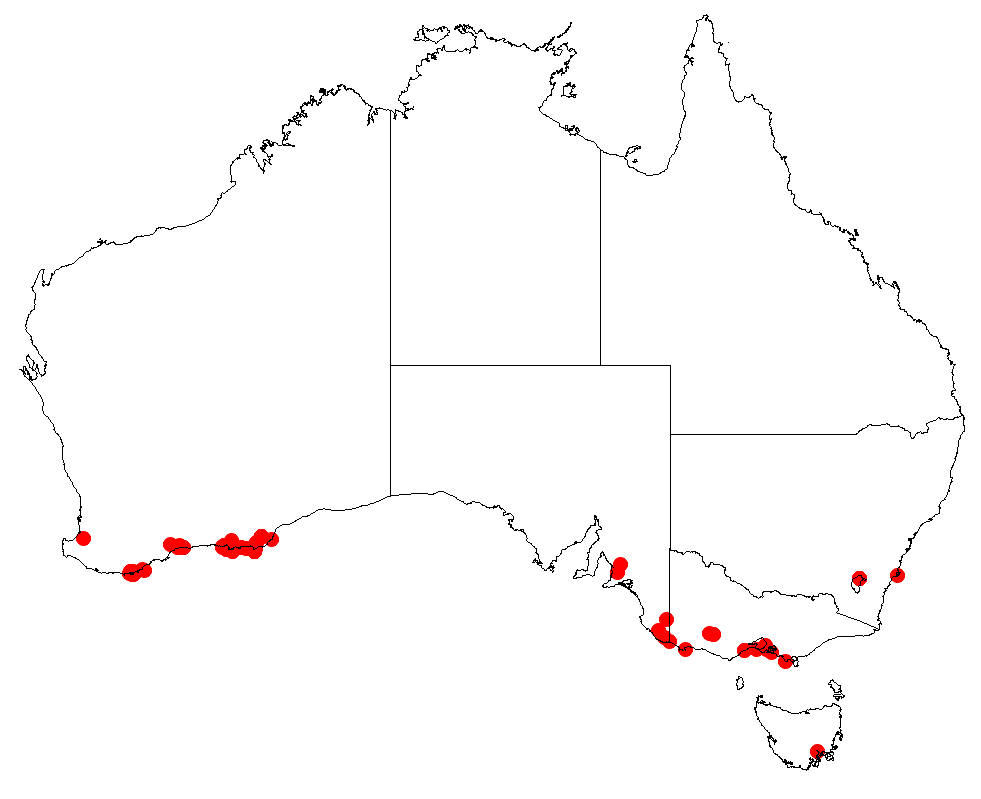
- Occurrence data from AVH

= Hakea drupacea =

Sweet-scented hakea

Species of plant native to Western Australia

Hakea drupacea, commonly known as sweet-scented hakea, is a tree or shrub which is native to south west Western Australia.

== Description ==
Hakea drupacea is an upright rounded shrub growing to 1–4 m (3–10 ft) tall. Smaller branches are hairy. The smooth needle-shaped leaves grow alternately, are 4–11 cm (1.6–4.3 in) long and 1–2 mm (0.039–0.079 in) wide ending in a sharp point. The leaf may divide into 2-8 segments. The inflorescence are short racemes of sweetly scented white or cream flowers tipped with pink or brownish pollen. The pedicel is 4–8 mm (0.16–0.31 in) long and the perianth 4–5 mm (0.16–0.20 in) long and smooth. The style is smooth and 4–6 mm (0.16–0.24 in) long. The flowers are abundant and appear in the outer leaf axils from March to June. The woody egg-shaped fruit are 20–25 mm (0.8–1 in) long and 15–19 mm (0.6–0.7 in) wide. The fruit surface is smooth with a few black pustules, ending with two prominent horns 2–4 mm (0.079–0.16 in) long.

== Taxonomy and naming ==
Hakea drupacea was first formally described by Karl Friedrich von Gaertner in 1807 and given the name Conchium drupaceum. It was also formerly known as Hakea suaveolens.

== Distribution and habitat ==
Sweet-scented hakea occurs mainly as a coastal species, between Albany and east of Cape Arid and on the Recherche Archipelago Islands. The species is naturalised in South Africa (where it is known as soethakea, meaning "sweet hakea"), New Zealand and coastal Victoria. Grows in open heath or low shrubland areas with granite hillsides occasionally quartzite areas or coastal limestone cliffs.

== Conservation status ==
Hakea drupacea is classified as "not threatened" by the Western Australian Government Department of Parks Wildlife.
