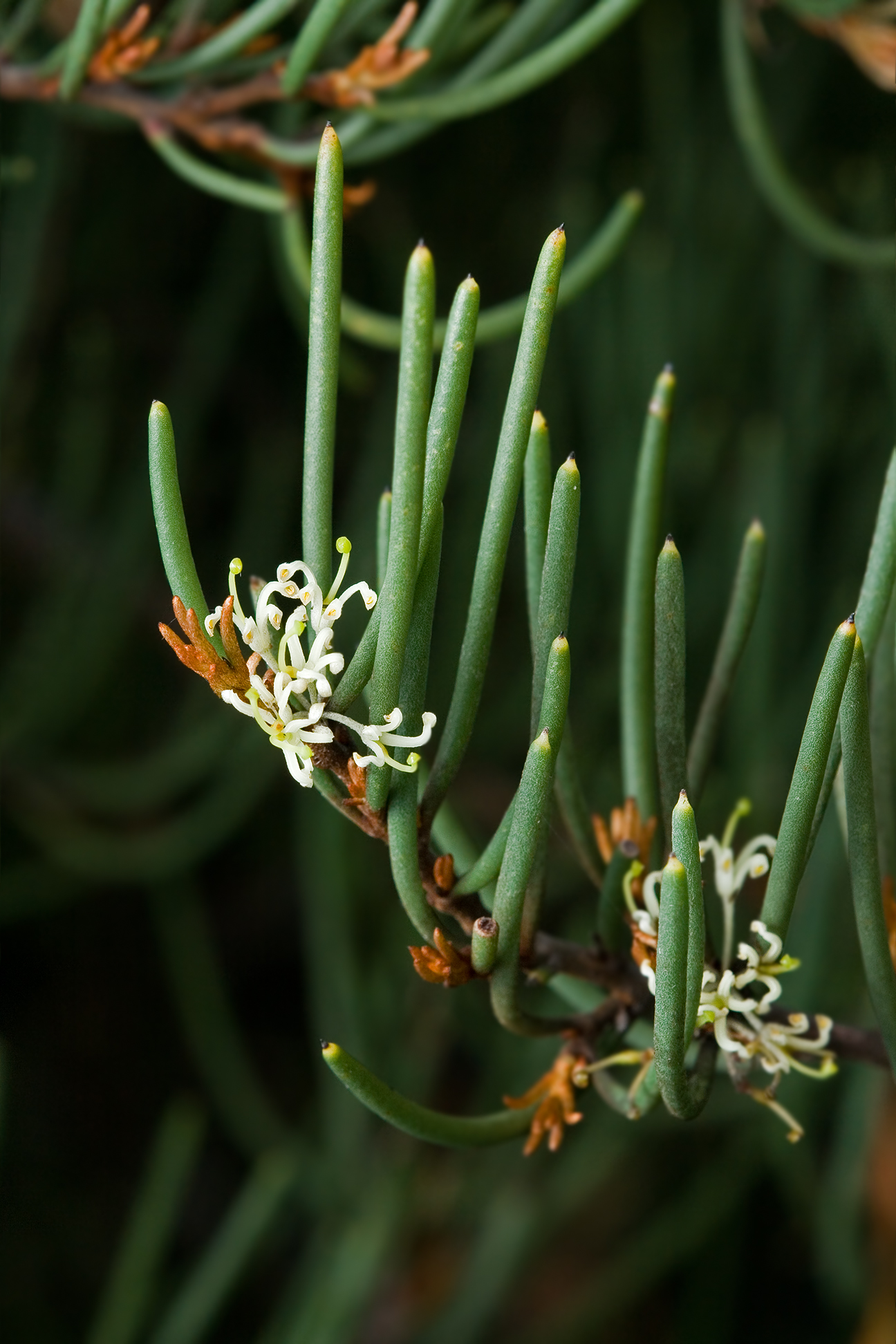
- At Cape Raoul, Tasman Peninsula, Tasmania

Scientific classification
- Kingdom: Plantae
- Clade: Tracheophytes
- Clade: Angiosperms
- Clade: Eudicots
- Order: Proteales
- Family: Proteaceae
- Genus: Hakea
- Species: H. epiglottis

Binomial name
- Hakea epiglottis Labill.
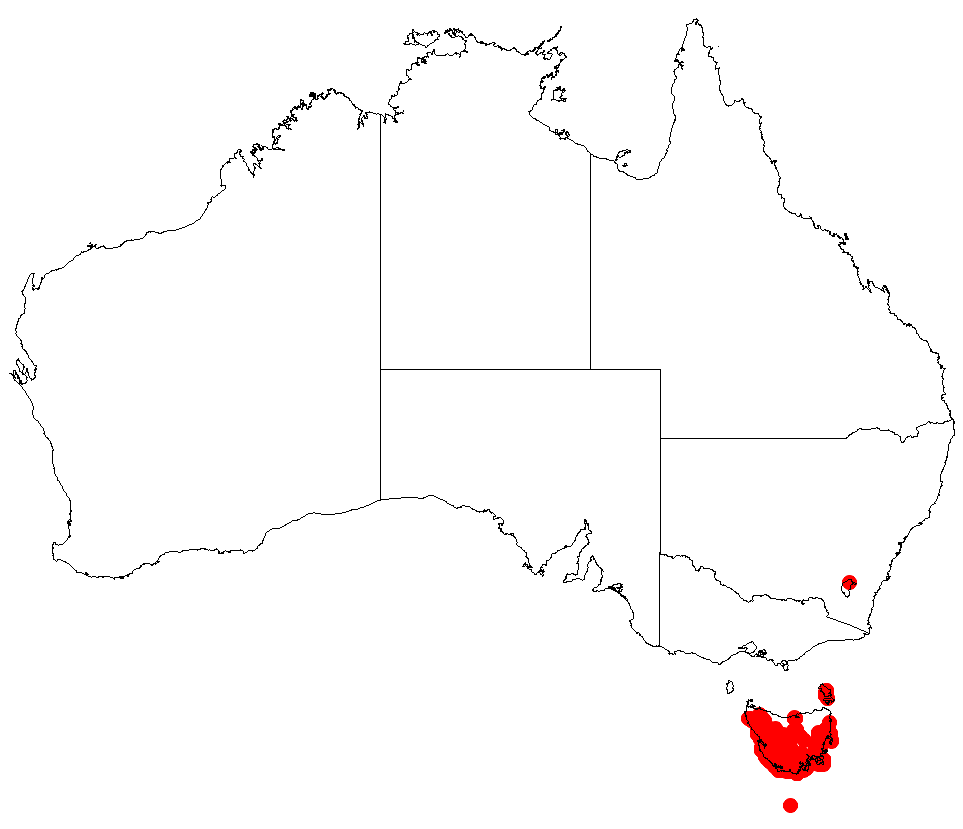
- Occurrence data from AVH

Synonyms
- Conchium epiglottis (Labill.) Willd.; Conchium teretifolium C.F.Gaertn.; Hakea rostrata auct. non F.Muell. ex Meisn.: Curtis, W.M. (1967); Hakea rugosa auct. non R.Br.: Curtis, W.M. (1967)

= Hakea epiglottis =

Species of shrub endemic to Tasmania, Australia

Hakea epiglottis is a shrub commonly known as beaked hakea or needlebush hakea. It is endemic to Tasmania, where populations consist of functional unisexual plants.

== Description ==
Hakea epiglottis grows to 3 m (10 ft) tall. The inflorescence on male plants have 2-8 flowers whereas female plants have 1–3 flowers. The bracts are 3–4 mm (0.3–0.4 cm) long on a stem about 1 mm (0.04 in) long. The flower stems are 3.5–5 mm (0.4–0.5 cm) long with flat white silky hairs extending on to sepals that are 2.5–4 mm (0.1–0.2 in) long and pale yellow inside. The pistil is recurved 5.5–6.5 mm (0.2–0.3 in) long. The style has a small pollen disc which is concave in male flowers but with a conical protuberance in female flowers. Fruit are shaped like the letter 'S' and are 1.4–2.6 cm (0.6–1 in) long. Needle-like leaves are 1.5–11 cm (0.6–4 in) long and 1–2 mm (0.04–0.08 in) wide. The young leaves are covered in rust-coloured hairs, which distinguishes this species from the similar Hakea megadenia. Unisexual populations have male plants which do not produce fruit but flowers that produce pollen. Female populations have fruit with no pollen. There are recorded populations of bisexual plants where the fruit occur together with flowers producing pollen. A 1989 publication by John Wrigley & Murray Fagg states that specimens at Wakehurst Place, an annexe of Kew Gardens London, are believed to be 60-70 years old measuring 3 m (9.8 ft) high and wide. Clusters of white through to bright yellow flowers appear in leaf axils in spring.

== Taxonomy and naming ==
The species was first formally described by Jacques Labillardière in Novae Hollandiae Plantarum Specimen in 1805. The specific epithet (epiglottis) is derived from the Ancient Greek words epi meaning "upon" or "on" and glottis meaning "mouth of the windpipe" perhaps a reference to "a perceived resemblance of the fruit to the upper respiratory system".

Two subspecies are recognised by the Australian Plant Census:

- Hakea epiglottis subsp. epiglottis has white hairs on the stalks and base of the flower. A more widely spread subspecies found in all but the north-eastern part of Tasmania.
- Hakea epiglottis subsp. milliganii has yellowish white hairs on the stalk but has rusty coloured hairs near the base of the flower. Has a more restricted distribution, confined to the west coast of Tasmania between Zeehan and Macquarie Harbour.

== Distribution and habitat ==
Hakea epiglottis is a common species found in all but the north-east coast of Tasmania growing in peaty heath.
