= Maryland Public Television =

PBS member network serving Maryland, USA

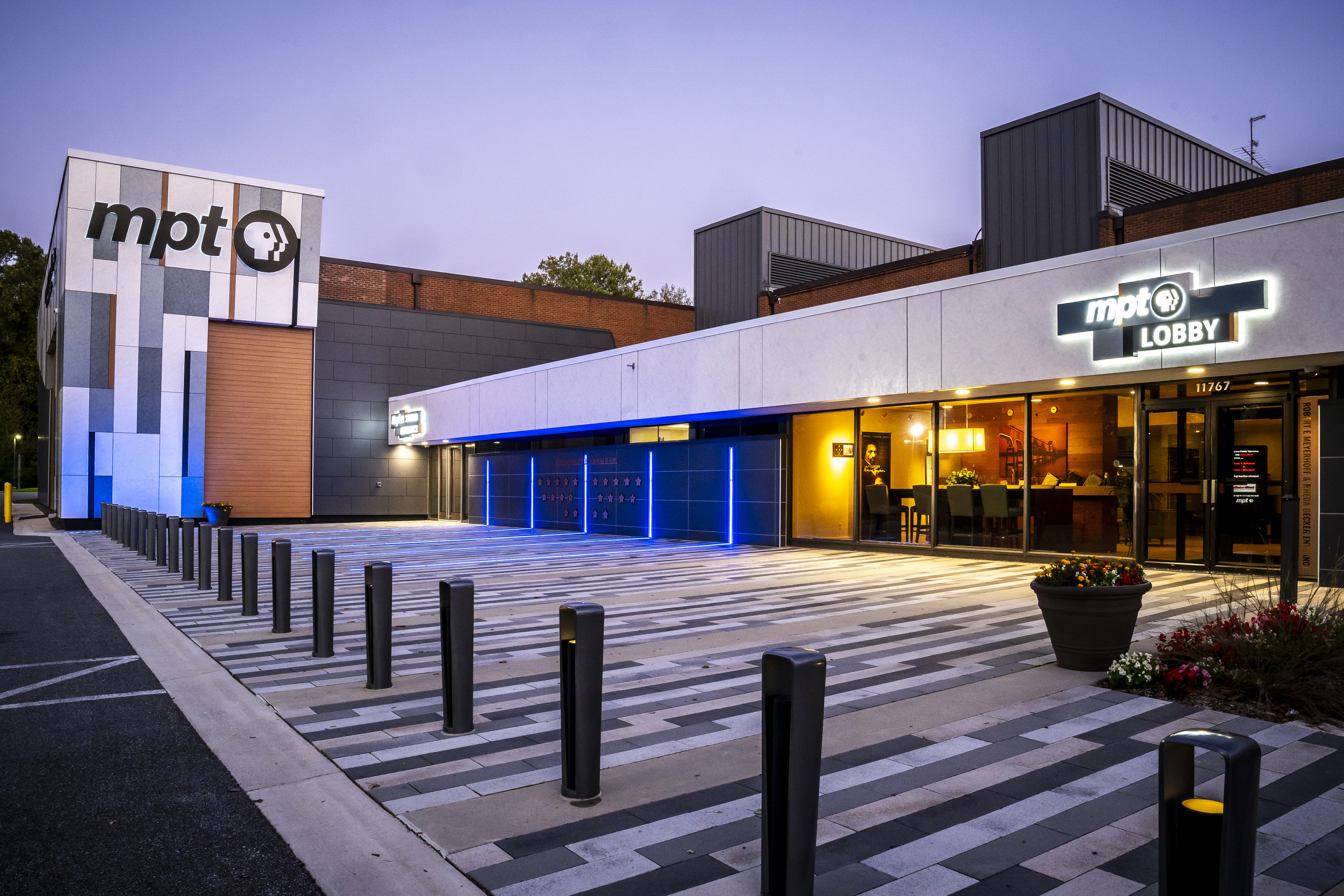
- The plaza at MPT's headquarters in Owings Mills.
- Statewide Maryland; United States
- Branding: MPT

Programming
- Subchannels: see § Subchannels
- Affiliations: PBS

Ownership
- Owner: Maryland Public Broadcasting Commission

History
- First air date: October 5, 1969

Links
- Website: mpt.org
- For technical information, see § Stations.

Maryland Public Television (MPT) is the PBS member state network for the U.S. state of Maryland. It operates under the auspices of the Maryland Public Broadcasting Commission, an agency of the Maryland state government that holds the licenses for all PBS member stations licensed in the state.

MPT's headquarters are located at the Irene and Edward H. Kaplan Production Studio on Owings Mills Boulevard in the unincorporated community of Owings Mills in northwestern Baltimore County. MPT operates six full-power transmitters that cover nearly all of the state, plus Washington, D.C., and parts of Virginia, West Virginia, Delaware, and Pennsylvania.

== History ==
WMPB (licensed to Baltimore) first signed on in 1969 as the first station of the Maryland Center for Public Broadcasting; it gained satellite stations in Salisbury, Hagerstown, and Annapolis between 1971 and 1975, resulting in a formation of a statewide public television network. The network adopted its current name in 1984. Maryland Instructional Television (Maryland ITV), a division of the Maryland State Department of Education, was also housed at the network until 1991. On July 4, 1987, WFPT (licensed to Frederick) signed on to fill coverage gaps in the outer Washington market, while WGPT in Oakland began operations to cover the extreme west of the state, much of which previously had no local television service at all.

About 1999, the network launched an afternoon Britcom programming block, Afternoon Tea, replacing children's programming. By 2009, MPT was airing kids' programming during the day on its MPT Select channel.

In September 2015, as part of budget cuts, MPT outsourced its master control operations to Public Media Management—a joint venture of Boston PBS member WGBH and Sony Corporation.

== Productions ==
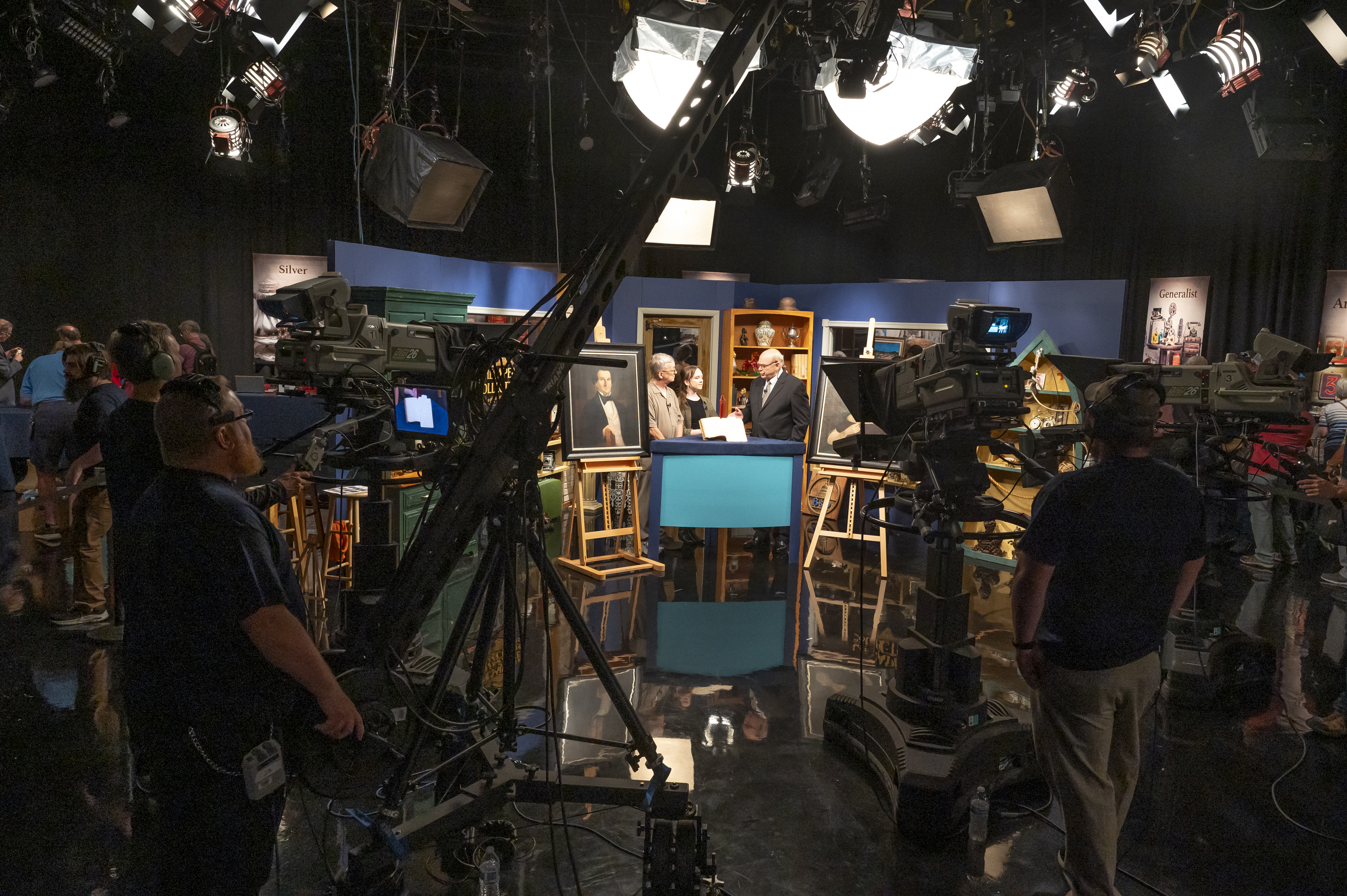
Inside The Irene and Edward H. Kaplan Production Studio during the Season 11 taping of MPT's original series Chesapeake Collectibles in June 2023.

=== Current regional productions ===
- Artworks: regional arts updates and specials highlighting Maryland's culture and history
- Chesapeake Bay Week: week long series of programs in April dedicated to the Chesapeake Bay
- Chesapeake Collectibles: weekly series featuring people and their collectibles
- Direct Connection: public affairs call-in show focusing on discussion and analysis of politics and the news
- Made in Maryland From the people to product design and delivery, find out about what's made in Maryland
- Maryland Farm & Harvest: weekly series helping Marylanders learn more about agriculture
- Outdoors Maryland: outdoors show highlighting the Mid-Atlantic region's diversity and beauty
- State Circle: news and analysis program detailing Maryland's General Assembly proceedings

=== Nationally distributed productions ===
- Christianity at a Crossroads: a four-part docuseries that explores the generation-long decline of Christian practice in America
- F.S. Key and the Song That Built America
- For Love of Liberty: series telling the story of America's black servicemen
- Great Performances: Star-Spangled Spectacular: Music special commemorating 200th Anniversary of FSK's National Anthem
- The McLaughlin Group: (2019–2020) a weekly political affairs round table
- MotorWeek: (1981–present) automotive magazine featuring new automotive technology and model reviews
- Music of Ireland: Welcome Home
- My Greek Table with Diane Kochilas: a cooking show focused on Greek cuisine hosted by Diane Kochilas
- National Geographic Bee
- Planet Forward: A special on energy, climate, and sustainability
- Steven Raichlen's Project Smoke & Project Fire: (2015–2021) outdoor cooking series with Steven Raichlen.
- To Dine For with Kate Sullivan: features stories of creators and dreamers at their favorite restaurant Kate Sullivan
- Veterans Day: A Musical Tribute

=== Regional documentaries and specials ===
- Chesapeake & Delaware Canal: Gateway to the World (2019)
- The Chesapeake Bay Bridge: Spanning the Bay (2014) an exciting look back at the monumental creation of the Chesapeake Bay Bridge
- The Chesapeake Bay Summit: (2016–2024) Moderator Frank Sesno and a panel discuss the status of the Chesapeake Bay
- Chesapeake Beacons (2020)
- Chesapeake Decoys: The Nature of Waterfowl Art (2022)
- Conowingo Dam: Power on the Susquehanna (2016) the dam's unique story and place in Maryland history
- Creatures of the Chesapeake (2021)
- Discovering the Dove (2023)
- Distinctive Homes of the Chesapeake: (2013) opening the door to Maryland's magnificent homes surrounding the Chesapeake Bay
- Eatin' Blue Catfish: Chesapeake Style (2023)
- Eatin' Crabcakes: The Best I Ever Had: (2011) the ultimate crab cake treasure hunt
- Eatin' Crabs Chesapeake Style: (2008) a rollicking foray into the world of the blue crab, from dockside to table.
- Eatin' Oysters: Chesapeake Style! (2017) who's eating & shucking oysters, why they love them, and where to find the best.
- Eatin' The Chesapeake: The Five Feasts (2018)
- Kent County's Storied Landscape: Place Past & Present (2023)
- Potomac by Air: (2015) explores incredible natural and man-made history along our nation's river
- Racing Rivals: Log Canoes of Chesapeake Bay (2024)
- Search for the USS Scorpion: (2017) search for the Commodore Barney's Flotilla
- Water's Edge: Black Watermen of the Chesapeake (2023)

=== Past productions ===
- A.M. Weather (1978–1995): a 15-minute daily program featuring detailed forecasts presented by NOAA meteorologists
- Baking with Julia (1996–1998) a cooking series with Julia Child (PBS)
- Barbecue University (2003–2006) outdoor cooking series with Steven Raichlen.
- Bob the Vid Tech (1993–2010), children's specials and interstitials.
- Camp David with Ann Compton (1987), a behind the scenes look at the second best known presidential address
- Coastal Cooking with John Shields (2005), 13 programs hosted by John Shields, distributed by American Public Television
- Consumer Survival Kit (1970s), national PBS series.
- Cooking in America with Pierre Franey (1991), series of 13 shows.
- Cooking With Master Chefs (1993), 16 shows hosted by Julia Child.
- Cuisine Rapide (1990), series of 13 cooking shows hosted by chef Pierre Franey.
- Dessert Circus (1997), a cooking series featuring Jacques Torres.
- Destination Maryland (2021–2024) discover attractions and hidden gems that make Maryland an ultimate destination.
- Hodgepodge Lodge (1970s), a nature show for children hosted by Jean Worthley.
- Jewish Cooking in America with Joan Nathan (1998–2002) (PBS)
- Julia Child: Lessons With Master Chefs (2000–2011) (PBS)
- Lynn Fischer's Healthy Indulgences (late 1990s), 26 shows hosted by Lynn Fischer.
- Maryland State of Mind (1994–2001), 28-episode series hosted by NPR's Scott Simon, showcasing the 13 schools of the University System of Maryland.
- Minidragons (1991–1993), six-episode documentary series featuring the growing economies of several Asian countries, portrayed through the lens of local people.
- MPT Salutes Vietnam Veterans: Maryland Public Television salutes the men and women who served in the Vietnam era
- Newsnight Maryland, a locally produced news program that reviews the stories happening in the state of Maryland.
- On Nature's Trail (1978), a television show featured Elmer and Jean Worthley observing and discussing plants growing at different locations in Baltimore County, Maryland.
- On Stage at Wolf Trap (1980s), concert series.
- Of Earth and Man (1970s), educational series.
- Our Town: a collection of documentaries showcasing different towns across Maryland
- Primal Grill (2008–2011) outdoor cooking series with Steven Raichlen.
- The Transformation Age: Surviving a Technology Revolution with Robert X. Cringely (2007), 1 hour documentary on technology and business. A co-production with the Robert H. Smith School of Business.
- To the Contrary (1992–2011) Persephone Productions (PBS)
- Volvo Ocean Race: sailing race around the world with host Gary Jobson
- Wall $treet Week with Louis Rukeyser (1972–2002), MPT's signature long running financial information program
  - Wall $treet Week (with Fortune) (2002–2005), which succeeded the original program after the departure of Louis Rukeyser
- Ways to Pay for College: annual special on finding money for higher education
- Weeknight Alive! (1980s), arts series
- Your Money & Business: consumer-oriented business magazine

==== Children's programs ====
- Kratts' Creatures (1996); children's series with the Kratt Brothers (PBS)
- Space Racers (2014); animated children's series, presenting station for season 1 only
- Wimzie's House; children's series, presenting station only
- Zoboomafoo (1999–2001); children's series with the Kratt Brothers and PBS in the United States; Canadian production handled by Cinar (now part of WildBrain).

== Stations ==
The MPT stations are:

Maryland Public Television transmitters
Station	City of license (Note: Aside from their transmitters, the MPT stations (except WMPB) do not maintain any physical presence in their cities of license.)	Channel; TV (RF)	Facility ID	ERP	HAAT	Transmitter coordinates	First air date	Public license information
WMPT	Annapolis	22 (21)	65942	1000 kW	284 m (932 ft)	39°0′36.7″N 76°36′31.8″W	September 22, 1975 (Note: WMPT used the callsign WAPB from 1975 to July 4, 1984.)	Public file; LMS
WMPB	Baltimore	67 (22)	65944	90 kW	307 m (1,007 ft)	39°26′49.9″N 76°46′47.2″W	October 5, 1969 (Note: WMPB used the callsign WETM during its construction permit from 1967 to 1968.)	Public file; LMS
WFPT	Frederick	62 (28)	40626	71.3 kW	156 m (512 ft)	39°15′38″N 77°18′43.6″W	July 4, 1987 (Note: First licensed in 1979 as translator W62AY and replaced by a full-power license from the same transmitter site.)	Public file; LMS
WWPB	Hagerstown	31 (29)	65943	700 kW	375 m (1,230 ft)	39°39′4″N 77°58′14″W	October 5, 1974 (Note: WWPB used the -TV suffix in its callsign from 1974 to October 15, 1976.)	Public file; LMS
WGPT	Oakland	36 (26)	40619	200 kW	283 m (928 ft)	39°24′14.3″N 79°17′36.1″W	July 4, 1987 (Note: First licensed in 1979 as translator W36AB and replaced by a full-power license from the same transmitter site.)	Public file; LMS
WCPB	Salisbury	28 (16)	40618	320 kW	154 m (505 ft)	38°23′9″N 75°35′31″W	March 18, 1971	Public file; LMS

Notes:

WGPT is assigned to the Pittsburgh, Pennsylvania, market and elects must-carry status on satellite providers there. For the purposes of pay-television carriage, WMPT and WMPB are assigned to the Baltimore market, while WFPT and WWPB are assigned to Washington–Hagerstown and WCPB to Salisbury.

MPT holds a construction permit for a translator, W23FE-D, which will be licensed to Lusby and cover parts of Southern Maryland that receive a marginal signal from WMPT and WCPB.

== Technical information ==
The stations' signals are multiplexed:

Subchannels of WMPT and WMPB
Subchannel		Res.	Short name	Programming
WMPT	WMPB	Res.	Short name	Programming
22.1	67.1	1080i	MPT-HD	PBS
22.2	67.2	480i	MPT-2	MPT2 (7:30–11:30 p.m.) / Create
22.3	67.3	480i	MPTKIDS	PBS Kids
22.4	67.4	480i	NHK-WLD	NHK World
54.1	54.11	720p	CWWNUV	The CW (WNUV)

Broadcast on behalf of another station

Subchannels of the other MPT stations
Subchannel	Res.	Short name	Programming
xx.1	1080i	MPT-HD	PBS
xx.2	720p	MPT-2	MPT2 (7:30 p.m.–11:30 p.m.) / Create
xx.3	480i	MPTKIDS	PBS Kids
xx.4	480i	NHK-WLD	NHK World

=== Analog-to-digital conversion ===
MPT's stations ended regular programming on their analog signals on June 12, 2009, the official date on which full-power television stations in the United States transitioned from analog to digital broadcasts under federal mandate. The stations' digital channel allocations post-transition are as follows:

- WMPB shut down its analog signal, over UHF channel 67; the station's digital signal remained on its pre-transition UHF channel 29, using virtual channel 67.
- WMPT ended regular programming on its analog signal, over UHF channel 22; the station's digital signal remained on its pre-transition UHF channel 42, using virtual channel 22. As part of the SAFER Act, WMPT kept its analog signal on the air until June 26 to inform viewers of the digital television transition through a loop of public service announcements from the National Association of Broadcasters.
- WCPB shut down its analog signal, over UHF channel 28; the station's digital signal relocated from its pre-transition UHF channel 56, which was among the high band UHF channels (52–69) that were removed from broadcasting use as a result of the transition, to its analog-era UHF channel 28.
- WWPB shut down its analog signal, over UHF channel 31; the station's digital signal remained on its pre-transition UHF channel 44, using virtual channel 31.
- WGPT shut down its analog signal, over UHF channel 36; the station's digital signal relocated from its pre-transition UHF channel 54, which was among the high band UHF channels (52–69) that were removed from broadcasting use as a result of the transition, to its analog-era UHF channel 36.
- WFPT shut down its analog signal, over UHF channel 62; the station's digital signal remained on its pre-transition UHF channel 28, using virtual channel 62.

=== Spectrum reallocation ===
As a part of the repacking process following the 2016–2017 FCC incentive auction, channels 38 through 51 were removed from television broadcasting. None of MPT's stations sold their allocations, but five of them moved channels within the UHF band: WMPT moved to channel 21, WMPB to channel 22, WWPB to channel 29, WGPT to channel 26, and WCPT to channel 16.

=== ATSC 3.0 ===
MPT joined the Baltimore market's ATSC 3.0 lighthouse station, hosted at WNUV, on June 24, 2021. In return, WMPT and WMPB hosts WNUV's main channel (54.1) to preserve coverage for existing ATSC 1.0 TV sets.
