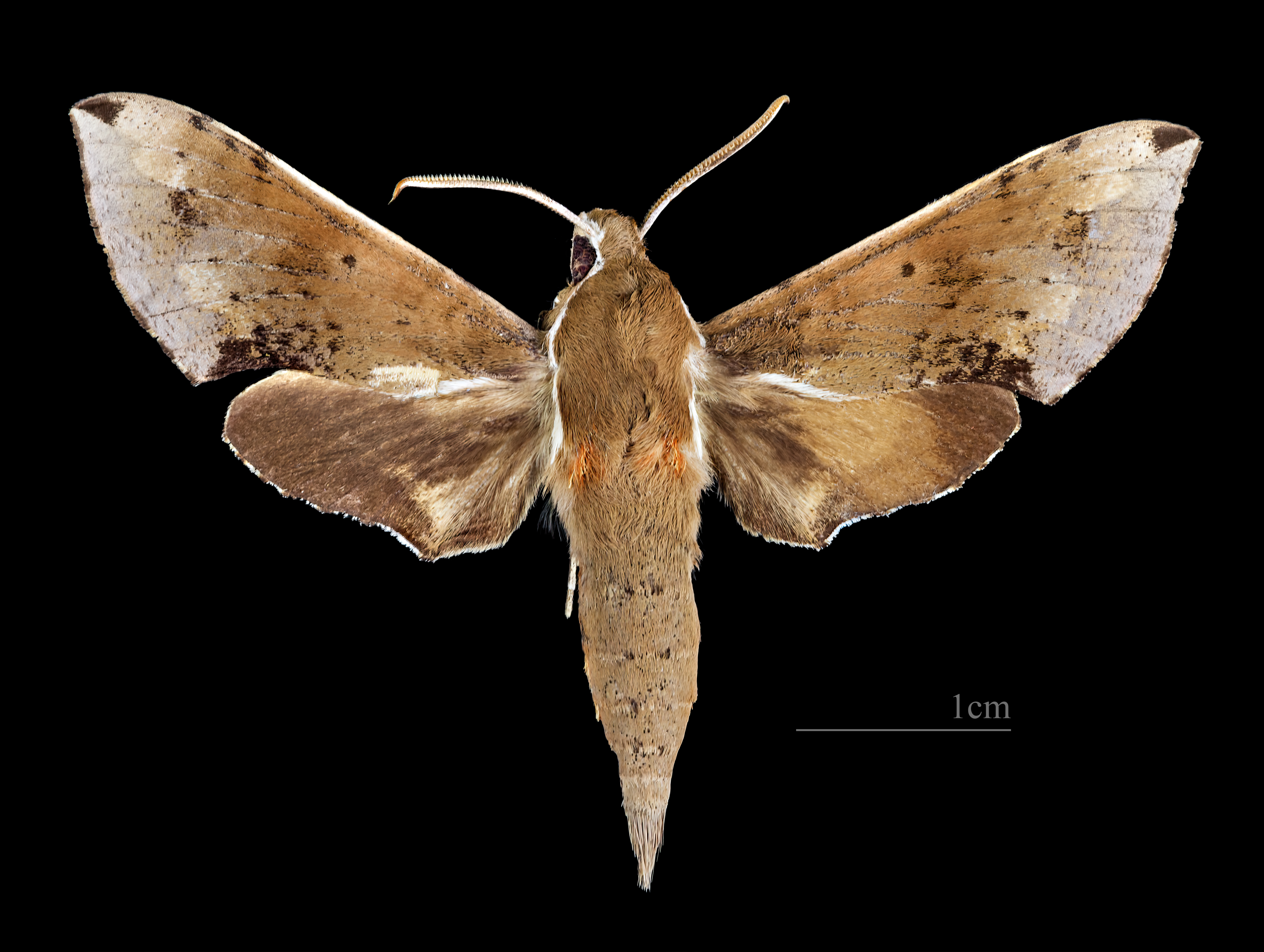
- Rhagastis mongoliana ♂
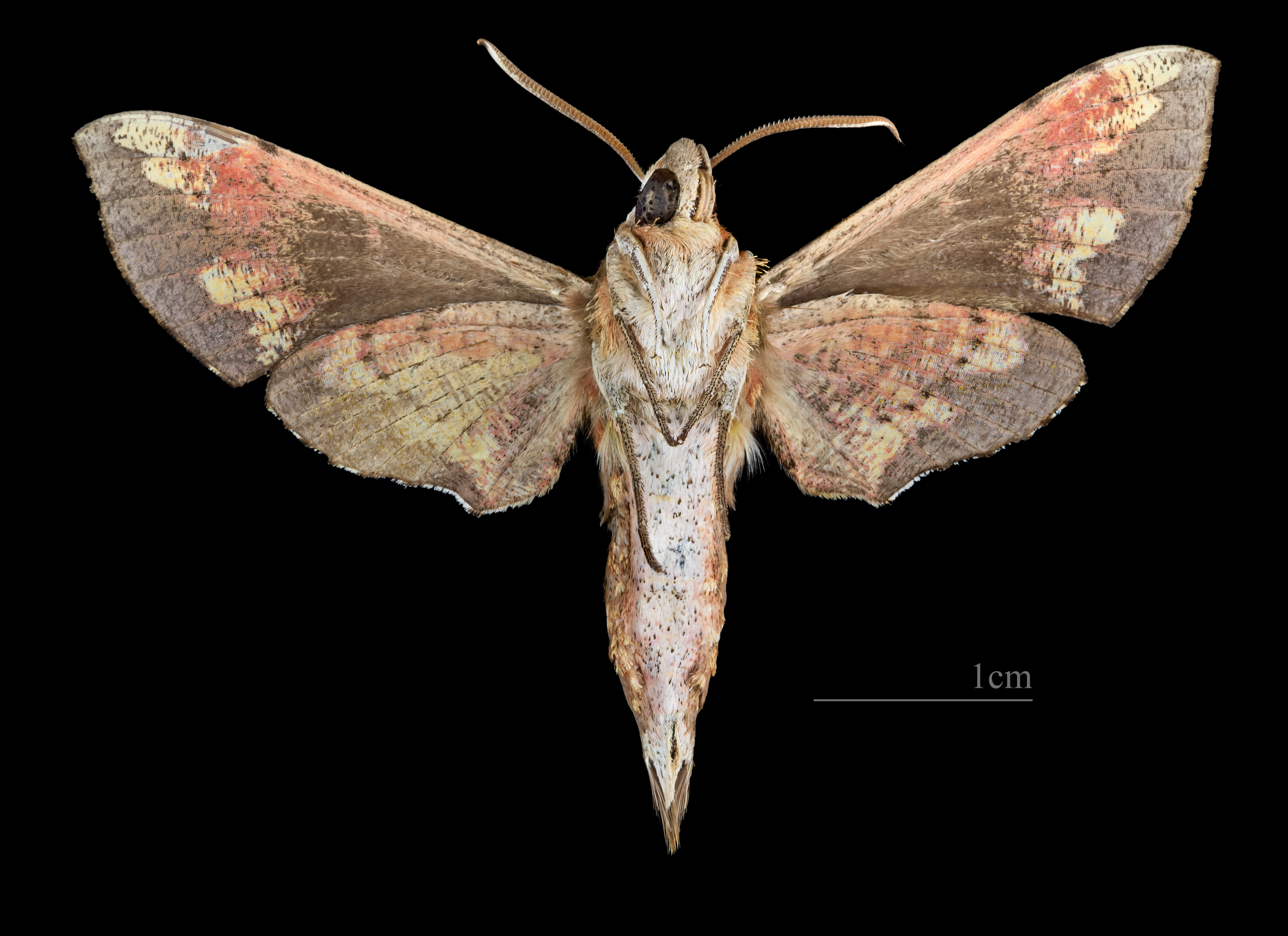
- Rhagastis mongoliana ♂ △

Scientific classification
- Kingdom: Animalia
- Phylum: Arthropoda
- Clade: Pancrustacea
- Class: Insecta
- Order: Lepidoptera
- Family: Sphingidae
- Genus: Rhagastis
- Species: R. mongoliana

Binomial name
- Rhagastis mongoliana (Butler, 1876)

Synonyms
- Pergesa mongoliana Butler, 1876; Rhagastis mongoliana pallicosta Mell, 1922

= Rhagastis mongoliana =

Species of moth

Rhagastis mongoliana is a moth of the family Sphingidae.

== Distribution ==
It is found from China, north to Mongolia, Korea and the Primorsky Krai in Russia, and east to Taiwan and Japan.

== Description ==
The wingspan is 47–63 mm. There are two generations per year, with adults on wing from late April to August in north-eastern China.

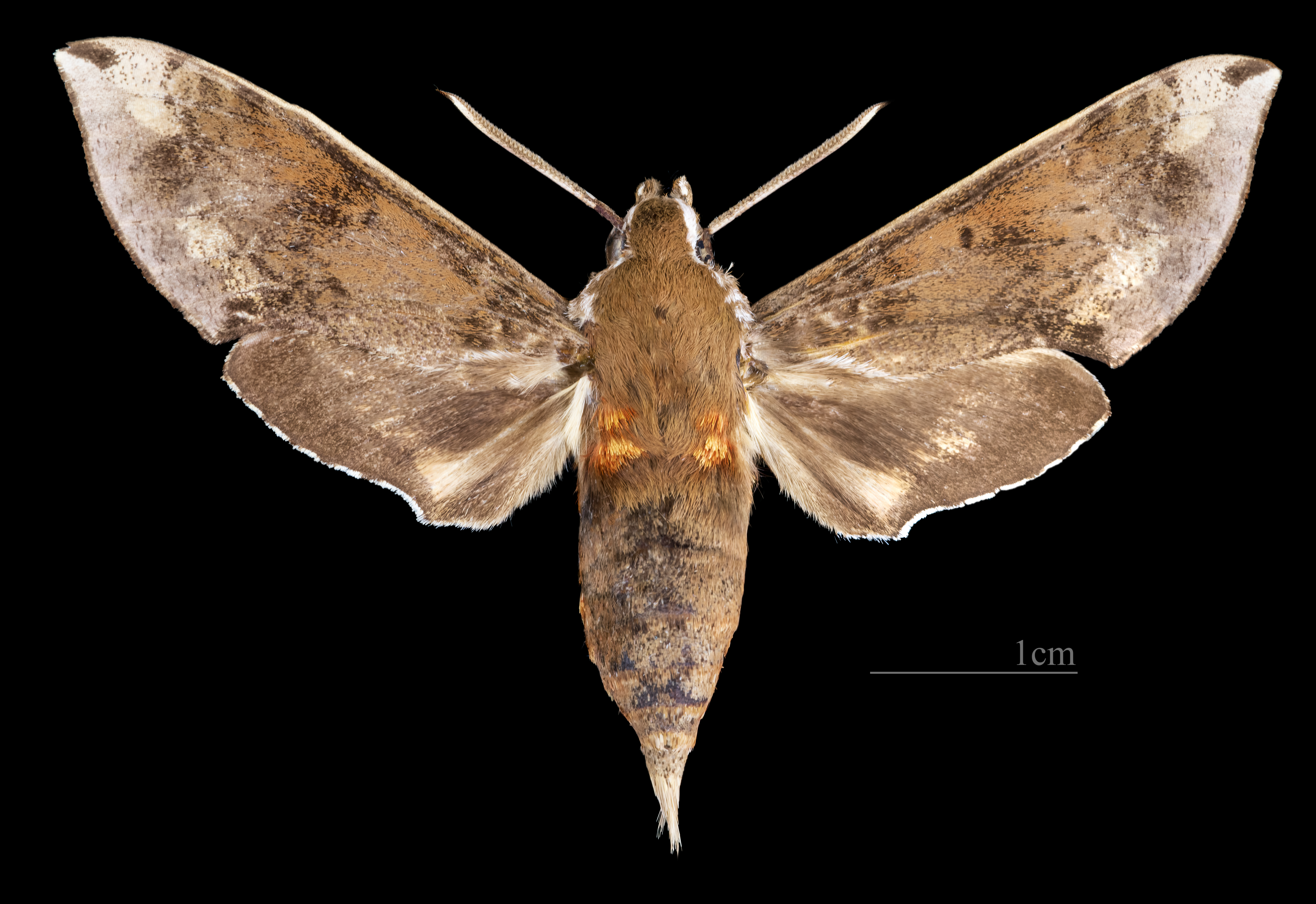
♀

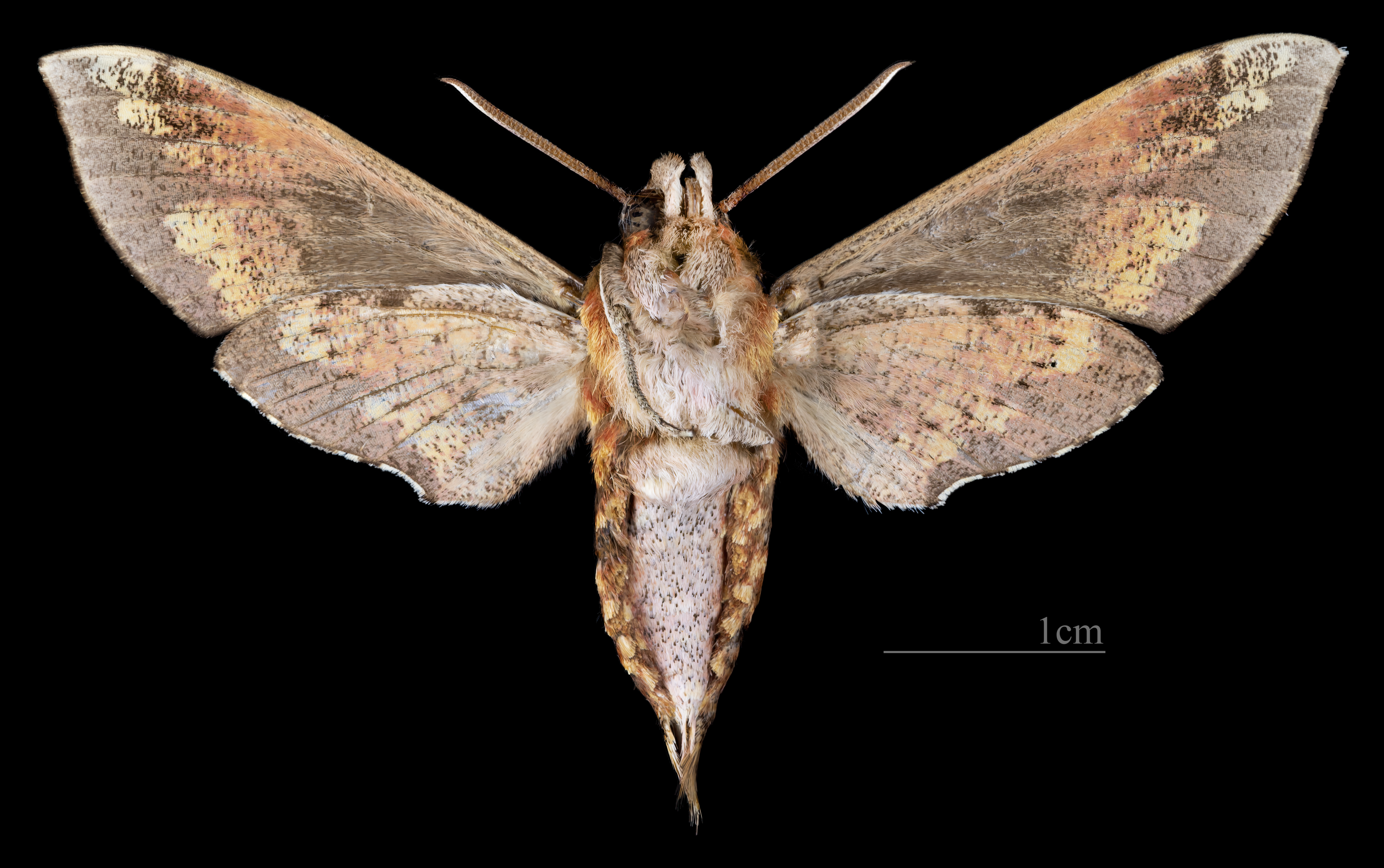
♀ △

== Biology ==
Larvae have been recorded feeding on Berberis, Cayratia, Impatiens, Polygonum and Vitis species in China, Cayratia japonica, Impatiens balsamina, Zantedeschia aethiopica and Parthenocissus tricuspidata in Japan, Impatiens balsamina and Galium verum var. asiaticum in Korea, Vitis amurensis in the Russian Far East and Cissus, Damnacanthus, Galium, Oenothera and Parthenocissus elsewhere.
