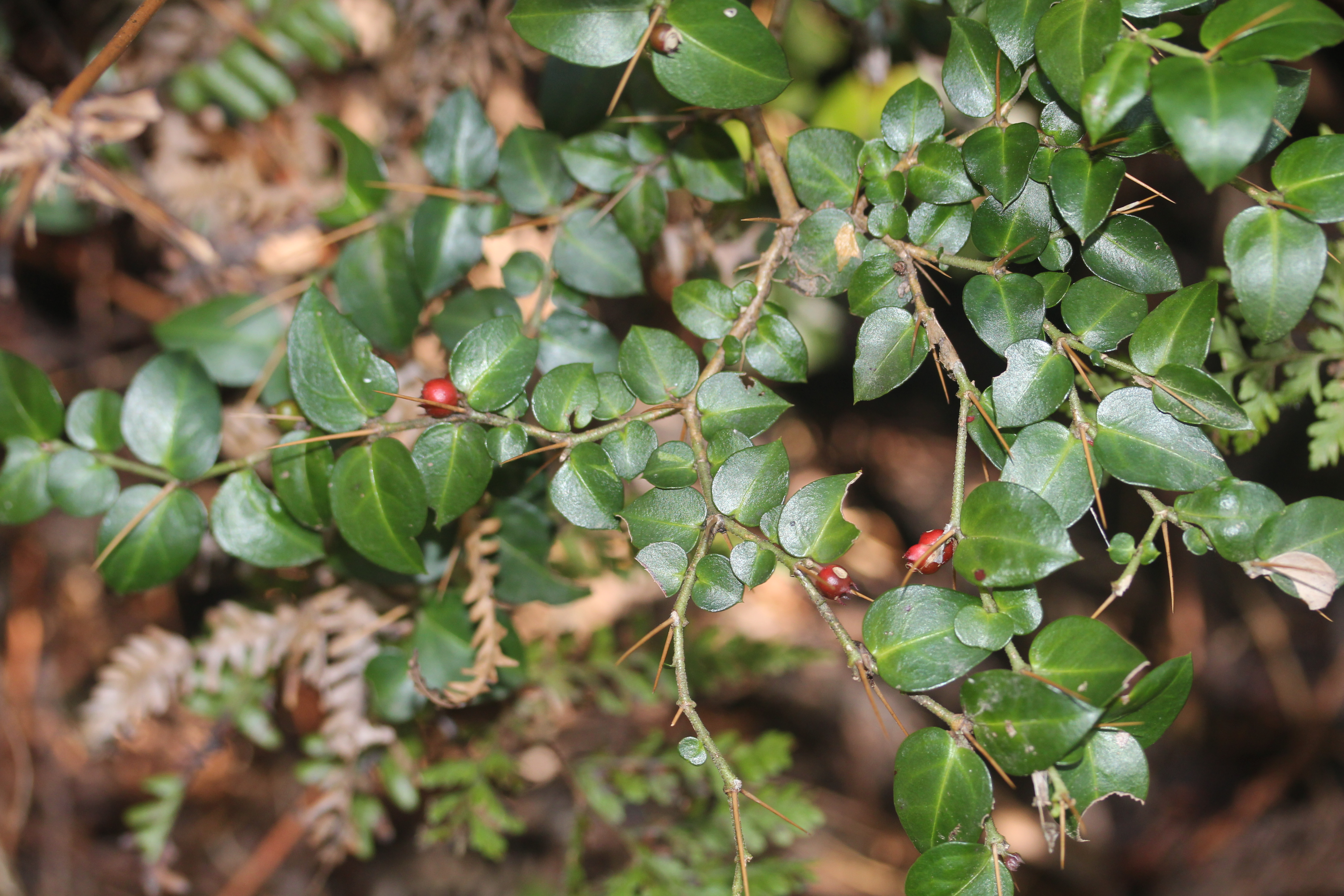
- Damnacanthus indicus

Scientific classification
- Kingdom: Plantae
- Clade: Tracheophytes
- Clade: Angiosperms
- Clade: Eudicots
- Clade: Asterids
- Order: Gentianales
- Family: Rubiaceae
- Subfamily: Rubioideae
- Tribe: Mitchelleae
- Genus: Damnacanthus; C.F.Gaertn.

Type species
- Damnacanthus indicus C.F.Gaertn.

Synonyms
- Baumannia DC.; Tetraplasia Rehder

= Damnacanthus =

Genus of plants

Damnacanthus is a genus of flowering plants in the family Rubiaceae. The genus is found from Assam to temperate eastern Asia.

== Species ==
- Damnacanthus angustifolius Hayata
- Damnacanthus biflorus (Rehder) Masam.
- Damnacanthus giganteus (Makino) Nakai
- Damnacanthus guangxiensis Y.Z.Ruan
- Damnacanthus hainanensis (H.S.Lo) Y.Z.Ruan
- Damnacanthus henryi (H.Lèv.) H.S.Lo
- Damnacanthus indicus C.F.Gaertn.
- Damnacanthus labordei (H.Lèv.) H.S.Lo
- Damnacanthus macrophyllus Siebold ex Miq.
- Damnacanthus major Siebold & Zucc.
- Damnacanthus officinarum C.C.Huang
- Damnacanthus x okinawensis Hatus
- Damnacanthus tsaii Hu
