= Jean Worthley =

American naturalist (1925–2017)

- Born: Jean Reese; February 23, 1925; Pasadena, California, U.S.
- Died: April 9, 2017 (aged 92); Finksburg, Maryland, U.S.
- Other name: Miss Jean
- Education: Goucher College (BA); University of Massachusetts Amherst (MS); University of Maryland
- Occupations: Naturalist, television host, writer

Jean Reese Worthley (February 23, 1925 – April 9, 2017) was an American naturalist. She hosted Maryland Public Broadcasting's children's television series Hodgepodge Lodge and co-hosted On Nature's Trail. She also wrote The Complete Family Nature Guide, which was published in 1976.

== Early life and education ==
Worthley was born in Pasadena, California, the daughter of Francis Sydney Reese and Waiva A. Dean Reese. Her father was an attorney. She graduated from Franklin High School in Maryland in 1940. At the age of 15, she enrolled at Goucher College where she graduated with a bachelor's degree in biology in 1944.

Worthley was a WAVE during World War II, working on codes for the United States Navy. She later attended University of Massachusetts Amherst, funded by a G.I. Bill. In 1948, Worthley graduated with a master's degree in entomology and zoology. The next year, at University of Maryland, College Park, she took graduate courses in human development and childhood studies.

== Career ==
Worthley taught kindergarten and ran preschools in Reisterstown and Garrison Forest when her children were young. She hosted more than a thousand episodes of Maryland Public Broadcasting's children's television series Hodgepodge Lodge from 1970 to 1976, and co-hosted On Nature's Trail. She appeared, in her "Miss Jean" persona, on a 1975 episode of Mister Rogers' Neighborhood, demonstrating how to make a terrarium.

Worthley and activist Florence Rogers worked for the designation of Soldiers Delight Wildlands to be designated as a nature preserve. She served on the Natural History Society of Maryland's board and edited the society's newsletter. She was president of the Soldiers Delight board of directors from 1997 to 1998, and led wildflower hikes along the preserve's trails. She taught her late husband's Worthley Botany Class, a weekly community course for adults, in the 1990s.

Worthley won a National 4-H Alumni Award in 1973. In 2007, Minnesota Public Television named an award the 'Miss Jean' Worthley Award for Service to Families and Children. Puppeteer and Baltimore native Kevin Clash was the award's first recipient.

== Publications ==
- "Successful Relocation of Phoebe's Nest" (1956)
- The Complete Family Nature Guide (1976)

== Personal life and legacy ==
Reese married botanist Elmer George Worthley in 1948. They had six children. Her husband died in 1991, and Worthley died in 2017, at the age of 92, in Finksburg, Maryland. An exhibit about the Worthleys is in the Soldiers Delight Visitors Center. In 2024, she was honored at the Natural History Society of Maryland's Founders Day event.
