= Consumer Survival Kit =

Consumer Survival Kit was a public television program that aired from 1973 to 1979. The half-hour series provided practical advice and solutions for a wide range of consumer issues, including purchasing cars, understanding medical care, and avoiding investment fraud. It was produced by the Maryland Center for Public Broadcasting and hosted by Larry Lewman.
