= Wild yam =

Wild yam is a common name for several plants and may refer to:

- Dioscorea dregeana, native to southern Africa
- Dioscorea japonica, native to eastern Asia
- Dioscorea villosa, native to eastern North America
