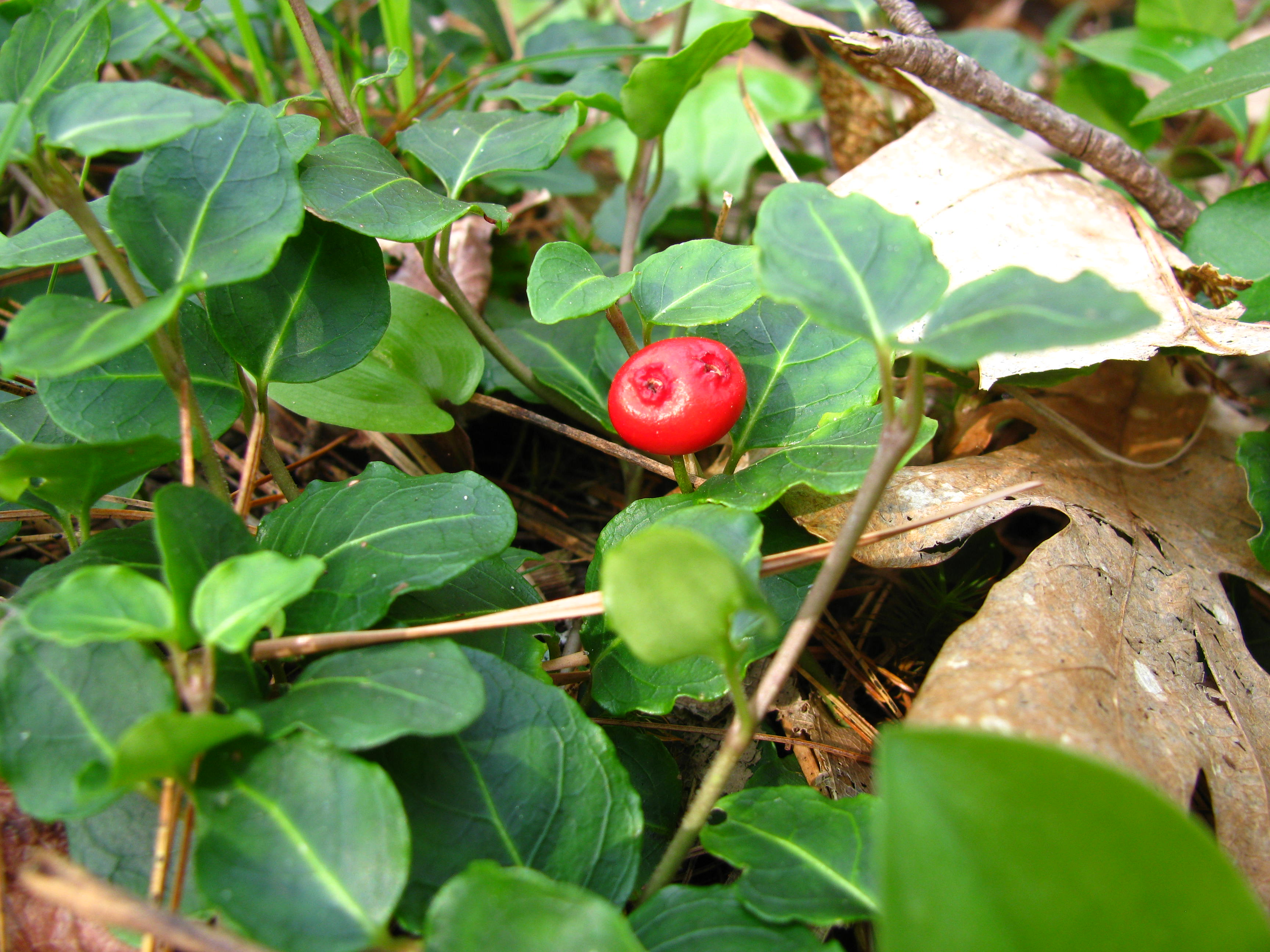
- Mitchella repens

Scientific classification
- Kingdom: Plantae
- Clade: Tracheophytes
- Clade: Angiosperms
- Clade: Eudicots
- Clade: Asterids
- Order: Gentianales
- Family: Rubiaceae
- Subfamily: Rubioideae
- Tribe: Mitchelleae
- Genus: Mitchella; L.

Type species
- Mitchella repens L.

Synonyms
- Chamaedaphne Mitch.; Disperma J.F.Gmel.; Geoherpum Willd.; Perdicesca Prov.

= Mitchella =

Genus of flowering plants

Mitchella is a genus of flowering plants in the family Rubiaceae. It is found from China to temperate eastern Asia, and from eastern Canada to Guatemala.

The genus Mitchella was named by Carl Linnaeus after his friend John Mitchell (1711–1768), an English physician who lived in America and gave Linnaeus much valuable information on the American flora.

It consists of two species of glabrous or puberulous, creeping, rhizomatous herbs with white axillary flowers with funnel-shaped corollas. They prefer mildly acidic soils, growing in woods near pines, hemlock or mossy hummocks.

The fruits of Mitchella repens, known as partridge berries, are eaten in some places.

== Species ==
- Mitchella repens L. - partridge berry - from eastern Canada to Guatemala
- Mitchella undulata Siebold & Zucc. - China, Japan, Korea, Taiwan
