= Bob the Vid Tech =

- Genre: Children's television
- Created by: Maryland Public Television
- Theme music composer: Don Barto, David Zee
- Original language: English

Production
- Executive producers: Jonathan Slade, Frank Batavick
- Editors: Steve Smith, Bob Mixter, Kathy Pugh

Original release
- Release: June 1, 1993

Bob The Vid Tech was an on-air children's host and a series of television productions for Maryland Public Television ("MPT") from 1993 to 2010.

Members of MPT's Vid Kid Club pose with host Bob the Vid Tech in the 1990s

== History ==
Discontinuing its daytime broadcasts of instructional television ("ITV") in 1993, MPT rebranded the time slot as "The Children's Channel" with additional PBS Kids programming. In need of a local personality and membership outreach to connect with the station's children's audience, a "Video Technician" a.ka. Vid Tech and an MPT "Vid Kid Club" were created for families to join. New York native and Maryland resident Robert Heck was hired for the Vid Tech role, using his nickname "Bob". While Bob the Vid Tech was played by an adult, he acted like an elementary age child who gets excited about learning and sharing his experiences. Collaborating with creators and producers Jonathan Slade and Susie Shaw, Heck also began portraying the other characters in his Vid Kid world, such as Momma Vid Tech, his brother Biff and Pop Quiz. He also provided the voice for his puppet friend Sid the Vid Fish. Each of these characters was featured at various times in short interstitials and in the open animation that began each longer format special program. Bob also had a friend named Brianna, played by singer Parris Lane, who was added in the summer of 2000 and acted as an on-air floor director and camera person for the daily broadcasts. Production of Bob the Vid Tech interstitials and specials ended in 2010.

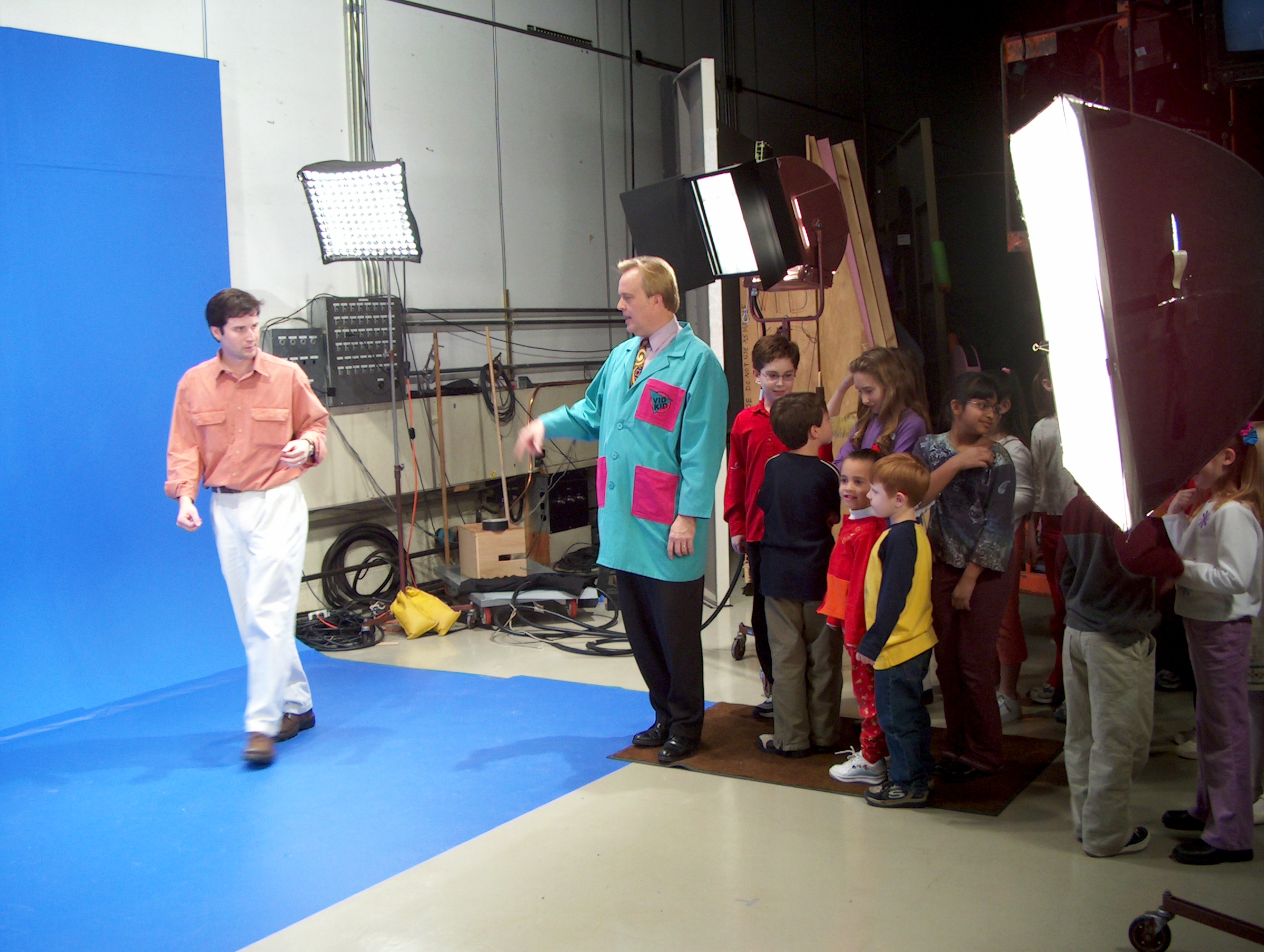
Bob the Vid Tech (Robert Heck) discusses a blue screen shot with producer Frank Batavick for the Kids and Family music video in 2002.

== Interstitials ==
To localize the on-air content and connect parents and young viewers with a local Maryland personality, short videos known as interstitials were produced by MPT and placed in between national PBS kids shows. Shot in studio and on location and ranging in length from 15 seconds to 1 minute, Bob would explore subjects from numbers to language to imagination, visiting people and places from around the state,such as his local library. In the late 1990s Maryland Public Television re-branded "The Children's Channel" block of programming as "MPT Kidworks", still featuring the aqua-colored jacket wearing Vid Tech. In 2002 it was announced that there would no longer be any new interstitials and that the station would rely on the 200 that had been produced, but production continued for the next 7 years under the umbrella of "MPT Kids and Family" with producer Frank Batavick. In 2003 Bob spoke with Maryland Governor Bob Ehrlich at his inauguration and discussed how they shared the same name. Bob's last televised outing was visiting the Maryland Special Olympics in 2009.

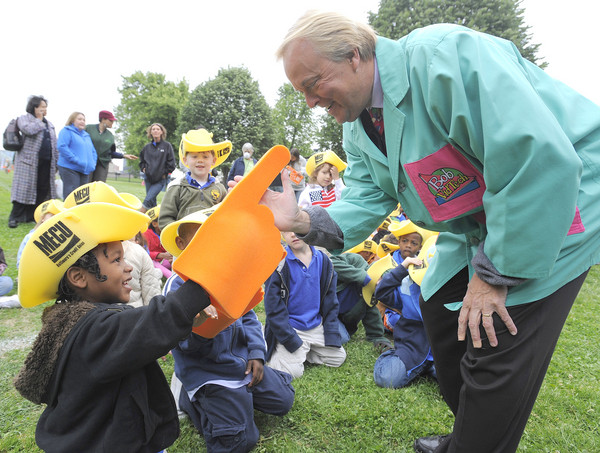
Maryland Public Television's children's host Bob the Vid Tech making an appearance at the Pee Wee Preakness event in Baltimore, MD.

== Public appearances ==
Acting as an Emcee on behalf of MPT's Vid Kid Club, Heck made regular appearances at malls, hospitals, schools, concert halls and festivals to perform and meet and greet his Vid Kid fans. Larger events, known as Vid Kid Roadshows, featured live stage performances with Bob and his "partner-in-fun" Brianna.

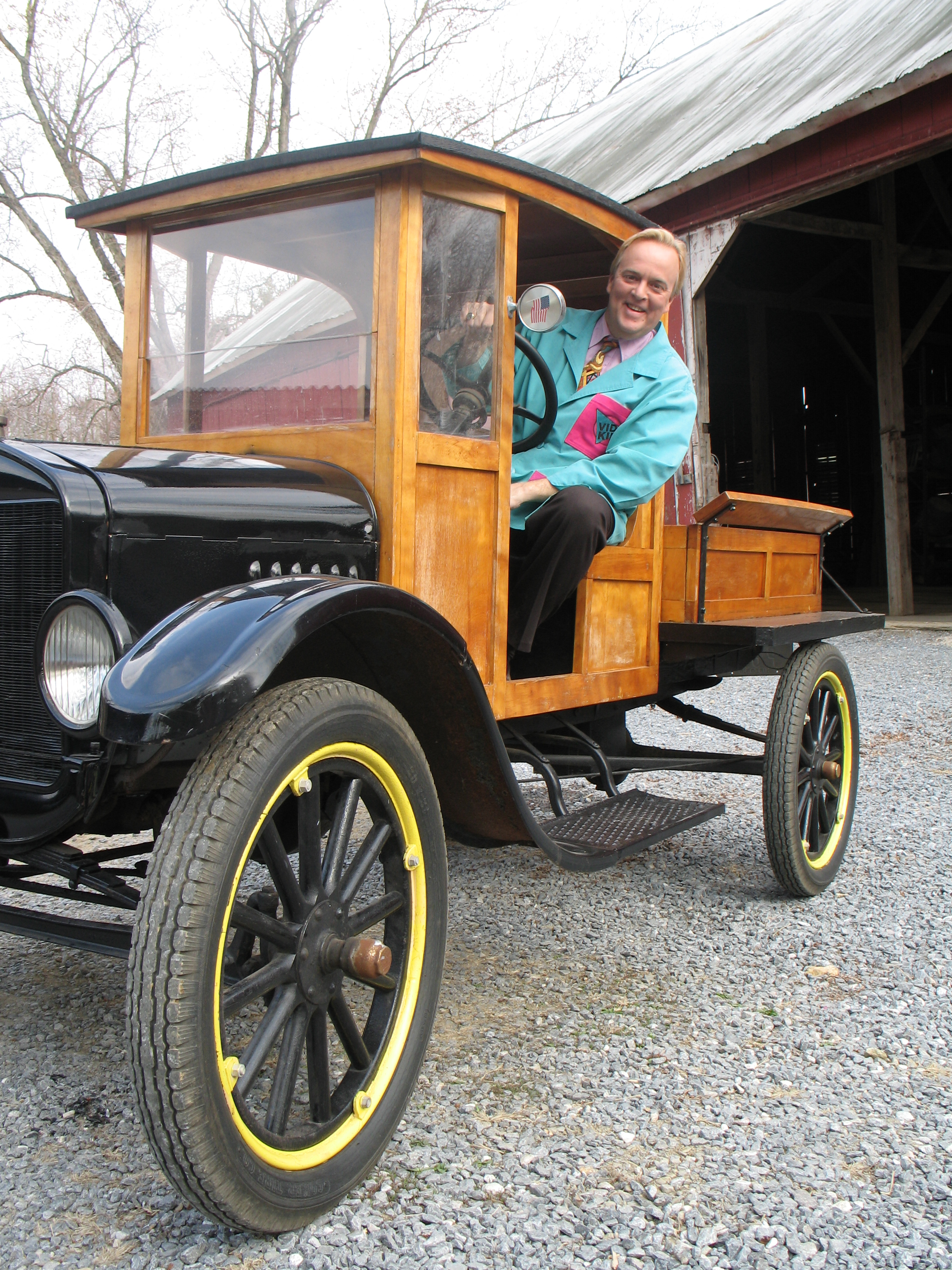
In the 2006 MPT special "Bob the Vid Tech: Planes, Trains and Automobiles", Bob rode inside a Ford Model T with MotorWeek host John Davis.

== Specials ==
Longer format specials enabled Bob and his young viewers to explore and learn various subjects in more depth. Beginning with 1993's Holiday Special and ending with Big City Adventure in 2009, twelve specials were produced. With broad themes such as history, space, water, music, communication, transportation and food, Bob would go on an adventure to learn as much as he could about each subject. The original open theme music was produced by Don Barto and was later replaced by musician David Zee in 2000 to accompany the updated open animation by editor Steve Smith.

- Holiday with Bob Heck (1993) Bob reads a bedtime story to children
- Vid Kid Field Trip to the National Aquarium: (1995) Bob learns all about life under the sea
- A Vid Kid Fable: The Day the World Stayed in Bed: (1996) What would happen if no one ever got out of bed?
- Vid Kid: Lost in Maryland History(1997) Bob goes back in time and experiences Maryland history first hand
- Vid Kid: Meeting the Challenge!: (1998) Originally known as "Vid Kid: Meeting the Challenge". Bob meets a group of very special Vid Kids—children with physical, mental, and emotional disabilities—and tags along with them as they learn, among other things, how to sail and ride horses
- Bob the Vid Tech: Blast Into Space!: (2000) Originally known as "Vid Kid: Blast Into Space", Bob reaches for the stars with the Maryland Science Center, Goddard Space Flight Center and NASA to save his brother Biff
- Bob the Vid Tech: Music to My Ears: (2001) Originally known as "Vid Kid: Music to my Ears". Bob the Vid Tech feels left out when he realizes he's the only one who doesn't know how to play an instrument in the Vid Tech family.
- Bob the Vid Tech: Water Water Everywhere: (2002) Bob learns the importance of water
- Bob the Vid Tech: Message in a Bottle: (2004) Bob learns how people have communicated throughout history
- Bob the Vid Tech: Planes, Trains and Automobiles: (2006) Trying to get to his Vid Tech family reunion in Cucamonga, California, Bob learns all about transportation
- Bob the Vid Tech: The Mystery of the Missing Pizza: (2008) Bob explores the world of agriculture
- Bob the Vid Tech's Big City Adventure: (2009) Bob learns all about Baltimore City.

== Awards ==
Bob the Vid Tech productions won many children's category and technical Emmy awards from the National Capital Chesapeake Chapter of the National Academy of Television Arts and Sciences, as well as a CINE Golden Eagle and Telly Award.
