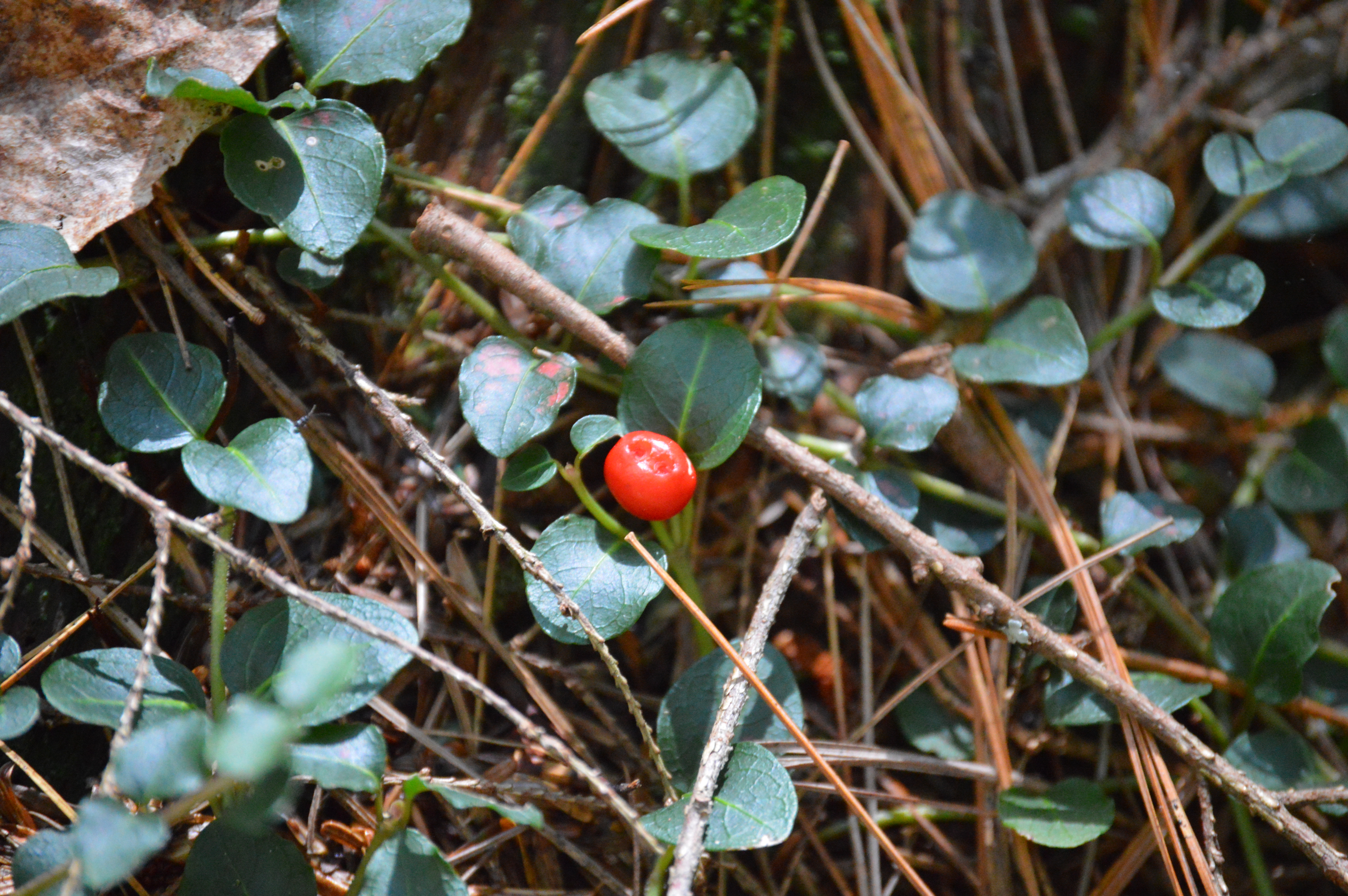
- Leaves and berry
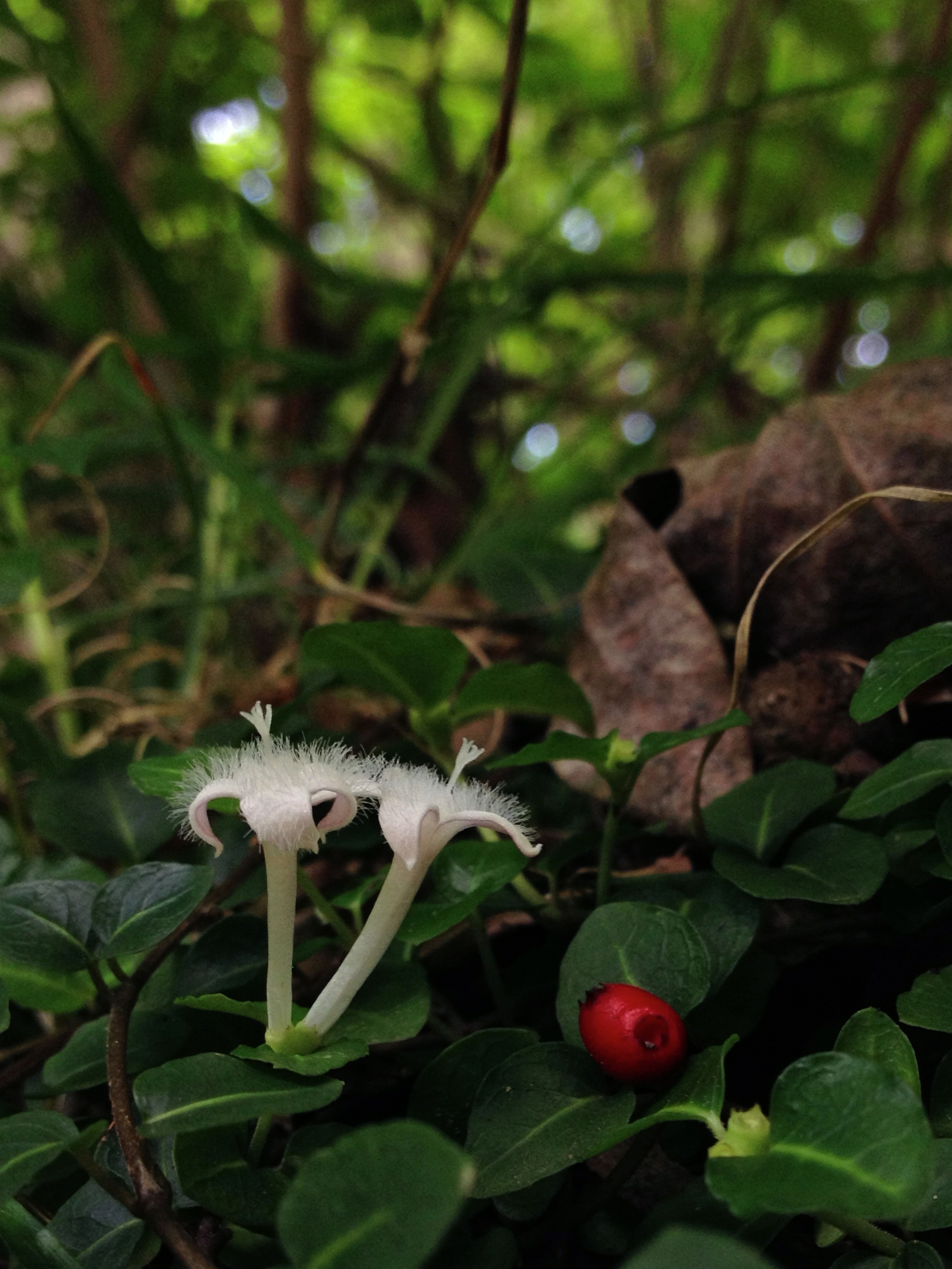
- Flowers and berry

Conservation status
- Least Concern (IUCN 3.1)

Scientific classification
- Kingdom: Plantae
- Clade: Tracheophytes
- Clade: Angiosperms
- Clade: Eudicots
- Clade: Asterids
- Order: Gentianales
- Family: Rubiaceae
- Genus: Mitchella
- Species: M. repens

Binomial name
- Mitchella repens L.

= Mitchella repens =

Partridge berry

Species of flowering plant

Mitchella repens (commonly partridge berry or squaw vine) is the best known plant in the genus Mitchella. It is a creeping prostrate herbaceous woody shrub occurring in North America belonging to the madder family (Rubiaceae).

== Names ==
Mitchella repens is one of the many species first described by Carl Linnaeus. Its species name is the Latin adjective repens, which means "creeping". Common names for Mitchella repens include partridge berry, (Note: Or partridgeberry. This name sometimes refers to Vaccinium vitis-idaea (the lingonberry), but wild partridgeberry is more common for that species.) Jesuit berry, squaw vine, (Note: Or squaw berry.) twin berry, (Note: Or twinberry.) two-eyed berry, running box, checker berry (Note: Checker berry usually refers to Gaultheria procumbens (the American wintergreen).) and tea berry (Note: Tea berry usually refers to Gaultheria procumbens (the American wintergreen).) in English.

In aboriginal languages, it is known as binemiin, binemin and binewimin in Ojibwe, noon-yeah-ki'e oo-nah'yea in Onondaga, osháisda’ wa:ya:s in Seneca, and fiːtó imilpá in Koasati (Coushatta).

== Description ==
The partridge berry is an evergreen plant growing as a non-climbing vine, no taller than 6 cm tall with creeping stems 15 to 30 cm long. The evergreen, dark green, shiny leaves are ovate to cordate in shape. The leaves have a pale yellow midrib. The petioles are short, and the leaves are paired oppositely on the stems. Adventitious roots may grow at the nodes; and rooting stems may branch and root repeatedly, producing loose spreading mats.

The small, trumpet-shaped, axillary flowers are produced in pairs, and each flower pair arises from one common calyx which is covered with fine hairs. Each flower has four white petals, one pistil, and four stamens. Partridge berry is a distylous taxon. The plants have flowers with either long pistils and short stamens (long-styled flowers, called pins) or short pistils and long stamens (short-styled flowers, called thrums). The two style morphs are genetically determined, so the pollen from one morph does not fertilize the other morph, resulting in a form of heteromorphic self-incompatibility.

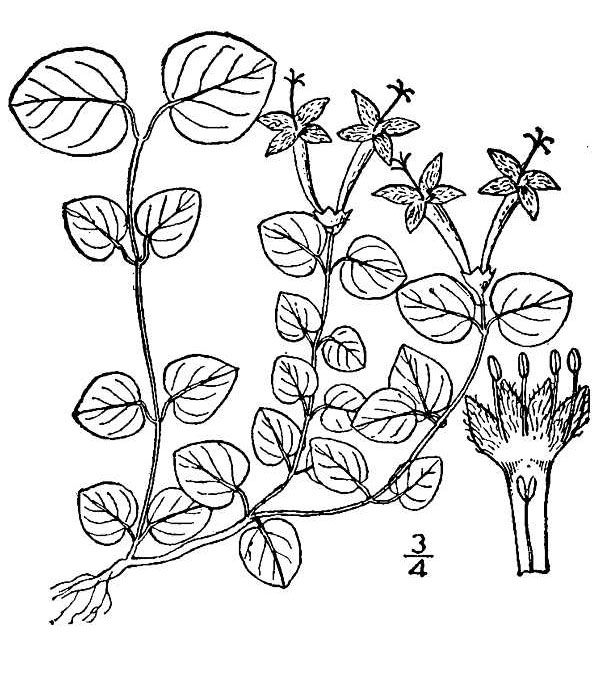
Partridge berry (Mitchella repens)

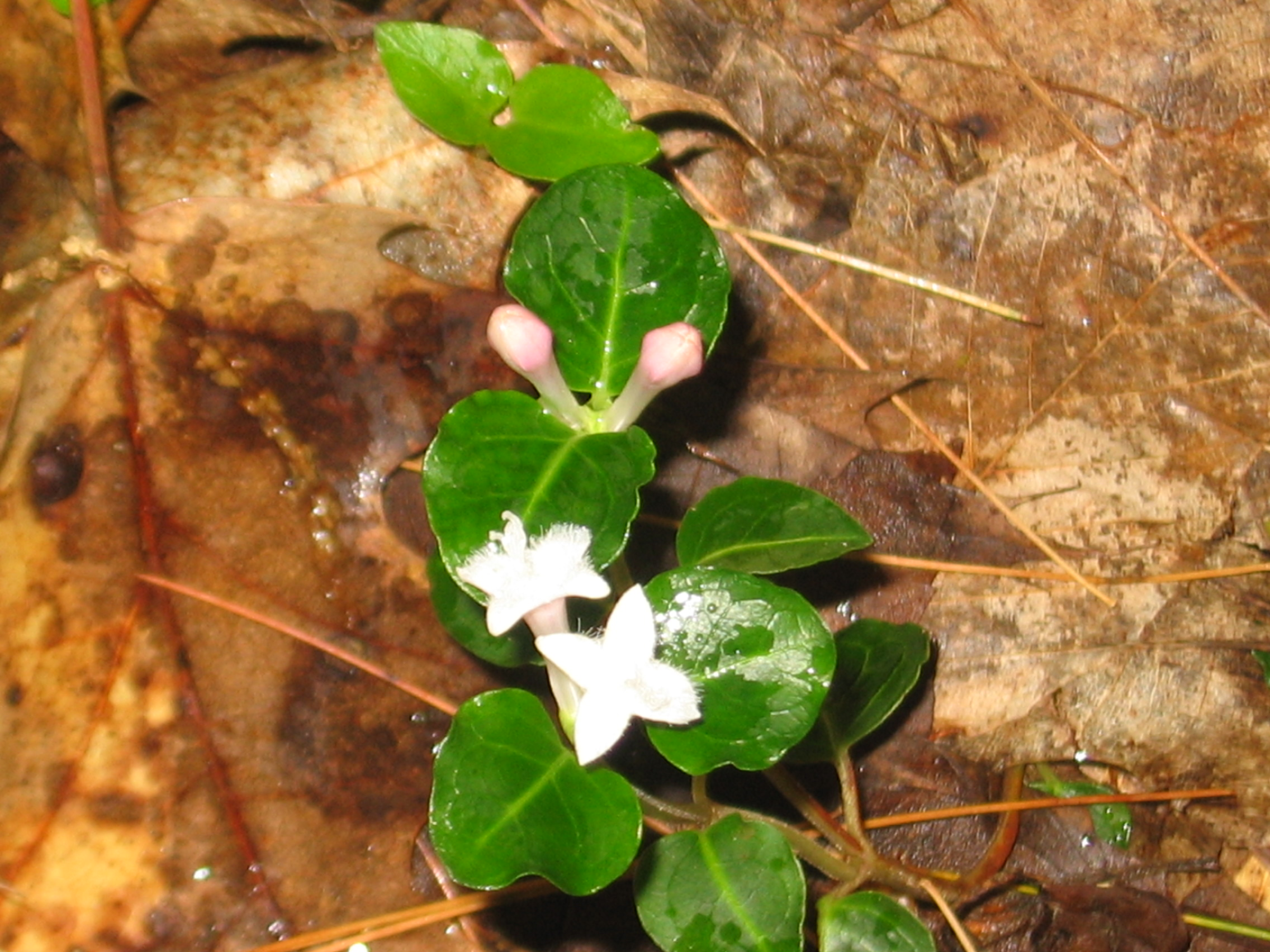
Foliage, inflorescence, and unopened blossom

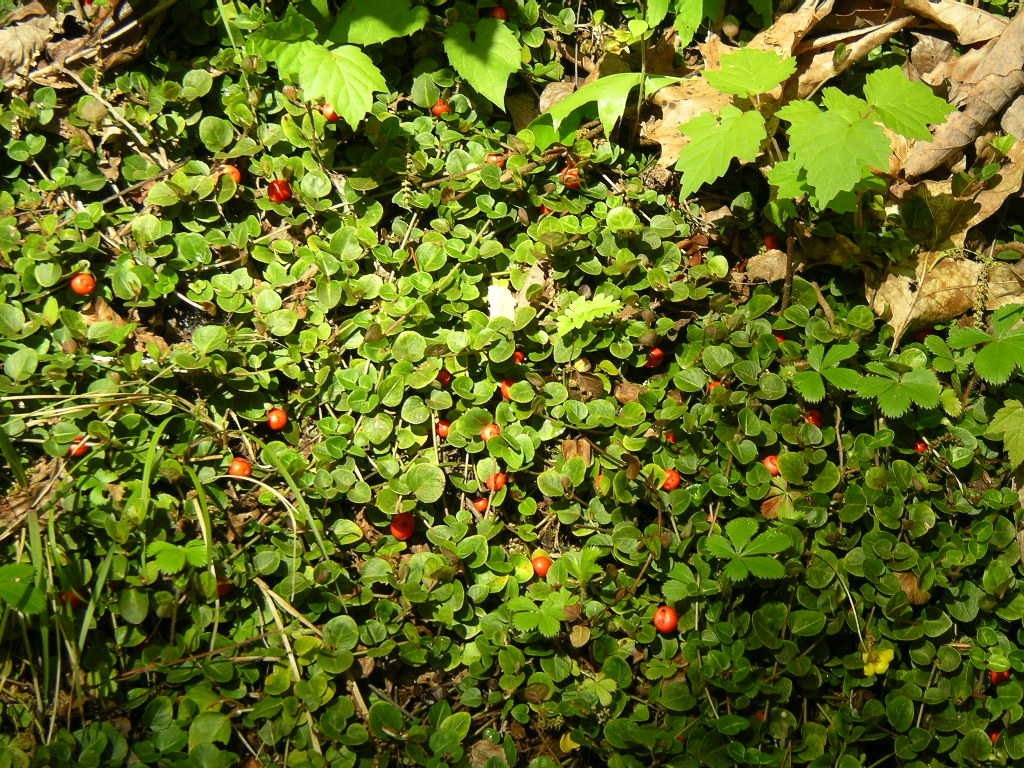
Berries

The ovaries of the twin flowers fuse together, so that there are two flowers for each berry. The two bright red spots on each berry are vestiges of this process. The fruit ripens between July and October, and may persist through the winter. The fruit is a drupe containing up to eight seeds. The fruits are never abundant. They may be part of the diets of several birds, such as ruffed grouse, sharp-tailed grouse, northern bobwhite, and wild turkey. They are also consumed by foxes, white-footed mice, and skunks. The foliage is occasionally consumed by white-tailed deer.

The common reproduction is vegetative, with plants forming spreading colonies.

== Distribution and habitat ==
The species is distributed throughout eastern North America, from south Eastern Canada south to Florida and Texas, and to Guatemala. It is found growing in dry or moist woods, along stream banks and on sandy slopes.

== Cultivation and uses ==
Mitchella repens is cultivated for its ornamental red berries and shiny, bright green foliage. It is grown as a creeping ground cover in shady locations. It is rarely propagated for garden use by way of seeds but cuttings are easy. The plants have been widely collected for Christmas decorations, and over collecting has affected some local populations negatively. The plants are sometimes grown in terrariums.

The scarlet berries are edible but rather tasteless, with a faint flavour of wintergreen, resembling cranberries (to which they are not closely related). Indigenous American women made a tisane from the leaves and berries that was consumed during childbirth; the Menominees used the leaves for a drink to cure insomnia.

Traditionally, the plant had numerous medicinal uses including as a diuretic (by the Cherokee and Iroquois), a diaphoretic (Cherokee), for women's problems or reproductive issues (Cherokee, Delaware, Iroquois), and as an analgesic or to reduce fever or swelling (Abenaki, Iroquois, Montagnais).
