= Heal-all =

Heal-all is a common name for the plant Prunella vulgaris.

Heal-all may also refer to:

- Pedicularis canadensis, or high heal-all
- Stachys, a genus of plants in the mint family

== See also ==
- Panacea (medicine), a cure-all, or a medicine capable of healing many ailments
