= Hodgepodge Lodge =

American children's television series

Hodgepodge Lodge is an American half-hour children's television series. It was produced by the Maryland Center for Public Broadcasting, and aired weekdays on PBS for 7 seasons and 1,114 episodes from February 10, 1970, to May 6, 1977. hosted by "Miss" Jean Worthley. Miss Jean invites elementary school children to her lodge to discuss wild animals and nature topics in a calm setting. Each episode is a half-hour long, and most episodes took place indoors around the lodge, but a few episodes took place outdoors.

Hodgepodge Lodge was aired on PBS stations on the East Coast and syndicated in the early and mid-1970s. Miss Jean took inner-city children on nature walks to show them the wonders of the natural world. Many of these children had never seen a garden or an animal outside of a zoo. Miss Jean taught them about the habitats of hedgehogs and foxes, and showed them the inside of a pine cone, which might contain a beetle or a worm.

Unfortunately, most episodes of Hodgepodge Lodge have been lost because the master tapes were erased to save money by allowing the tapes to be reused. Of the over 760 original episodes, only about 30 remain. Maryland Public Broadcasting offers some of the surviving episodes on DVD, and episodes can also be found on the American Archive of Public Broadcasting web site.
