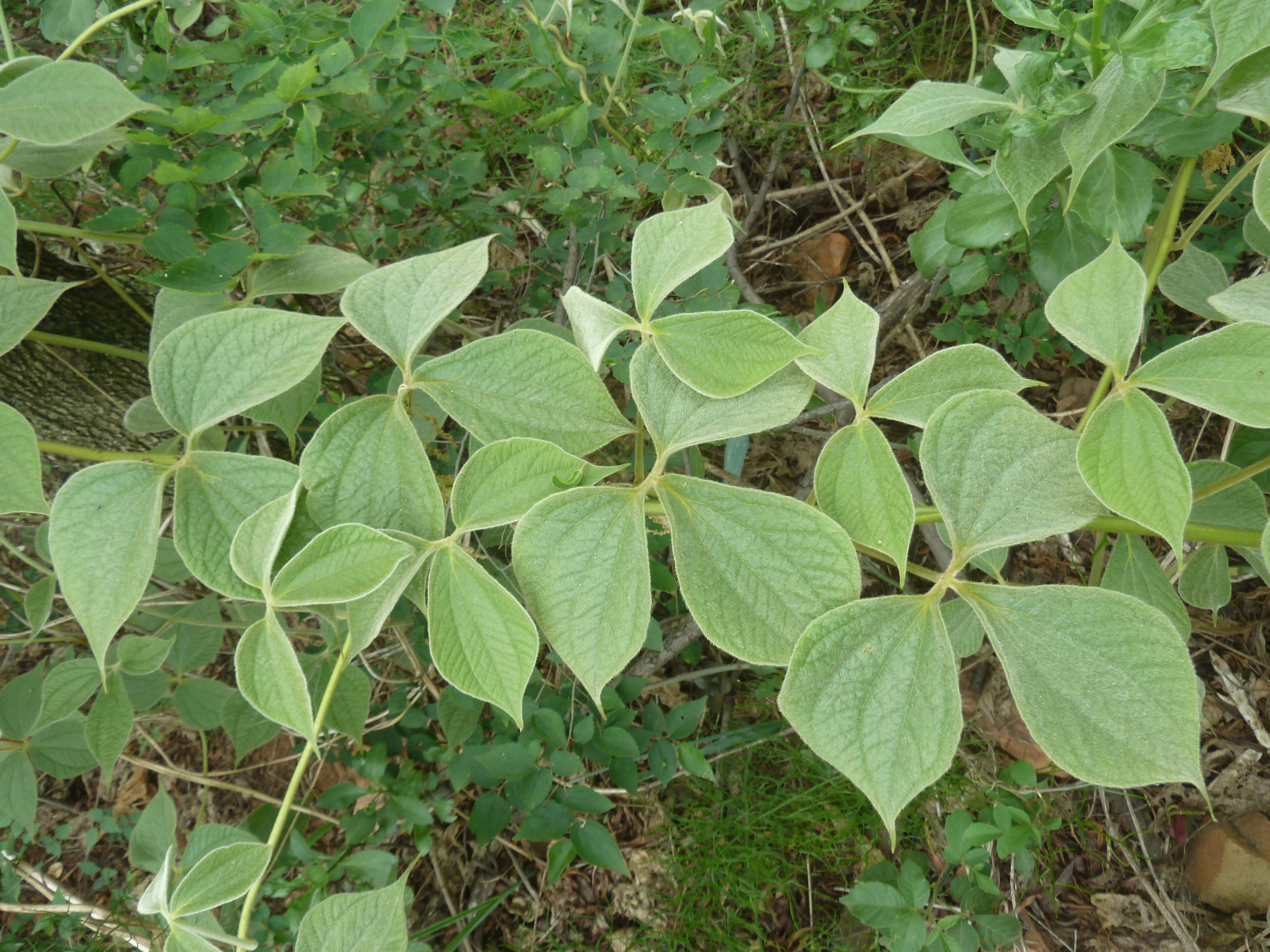

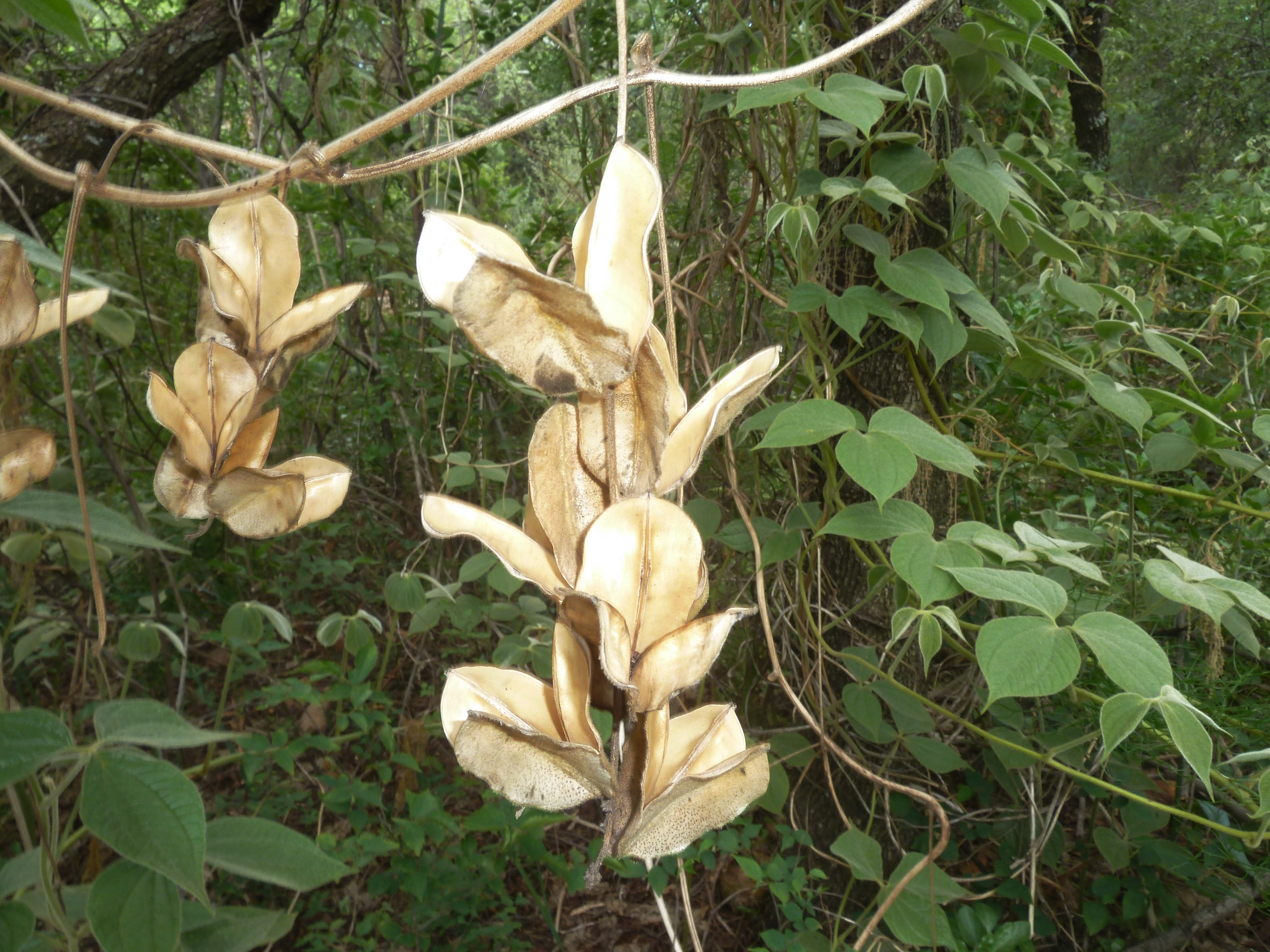

Scientific classification
- Kingdom: Plantae
- Clade: Tracheophytes
- Clade: Angiosperms
- Clade: Monocots
- Order: Dioscoreales
- Family: Dioscoreaceae
- Genus: Dioscorea
- Species: D. dregeana

Binomial name
- Dioscorea dregeana (Kunth) T.Durand & Schinz, 1894

= Dioscorea dregeana =

Species of yam

Dioscorea dregeana, the wild yam, is a perennial creeper that is native to the eastern parts of southern Africa. It is commonly used and traded as a traditional medicine, or muti.

== Range ==
It is native to eastern South Africa and Eswatini.

== Description ==
A slightly thorny stem sprouts annually from a tuberous rootstock. The plant becomes dormant in winter.
