= USS Scorpion =

USS Scorpion may refer to:

- USS Scorpion (1812), a block sloop in commission from 1812 to 1814 that was part of Joshua Barney's Chesapeake Bay Flotilla in the War of 1812.
- USS Scorpion (1813), a schooner in commission from 1813 to 1814 serving on the upper Great Lakes in the War of 1812.
- USS Scorpion (1847), a bark-rigged steamer of the Mexican–American War in commission from 1847 to 1848.
- USS Scorpion (PY-3), a patrol yacht and gunboat in commission from 1898 to 1899, 1899–1901, and 1902 to 1927 that saw action in the Spanish–American War in 1898.
- USS Scorpion (SS-278), a Gato-class submarine, in commission from 1942 until lost in 1944 during World War II.
- USS Scorpion (SSN-589), a Skipjack-class nuclear-powered submarine, in commission from 1960 until lost in an accident in 1968.
- USS Scorpion, a fictional submarine in the 1957 novel On the Beach.
