= Karl Friedrich von Gaertner =

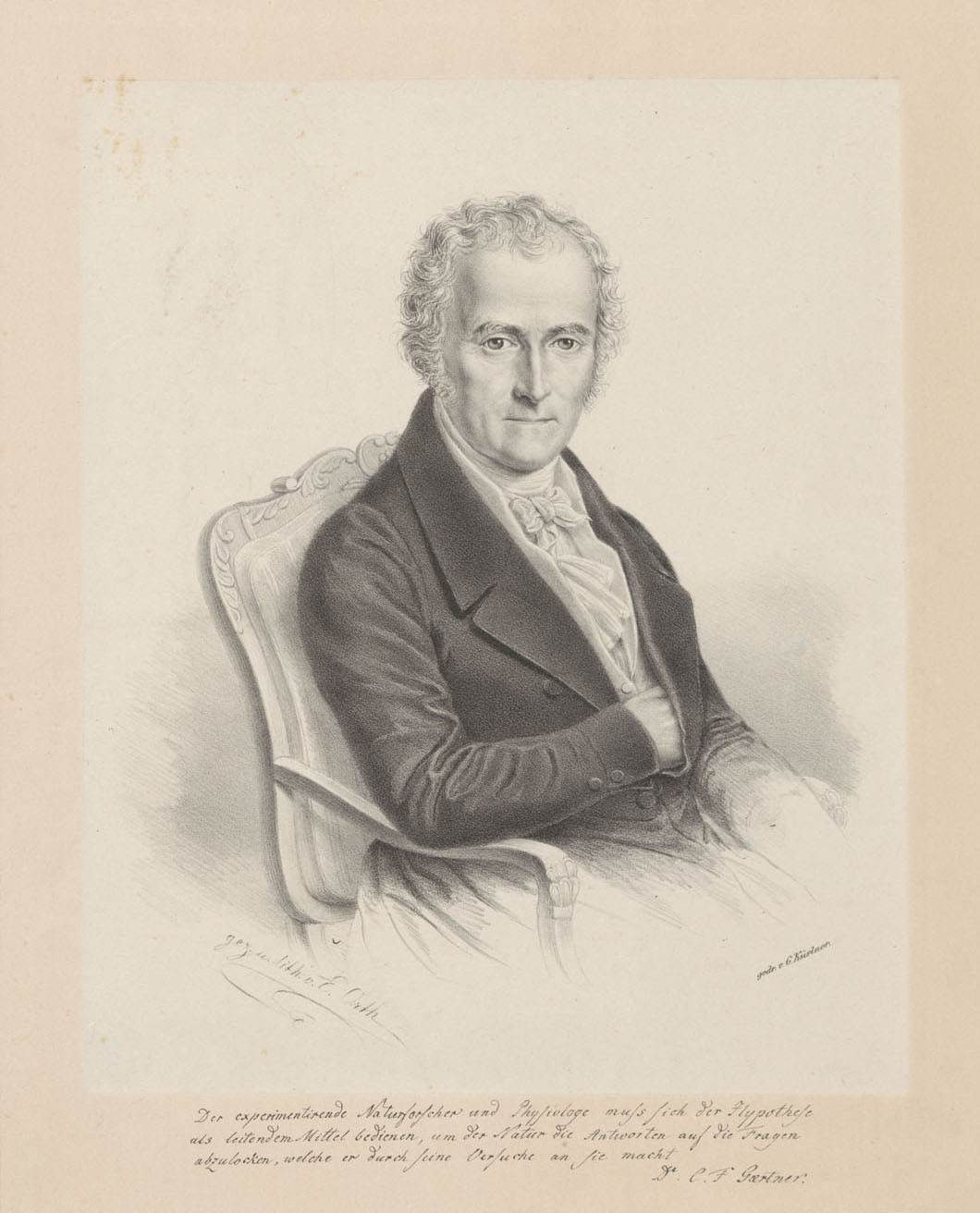
Karl Friedrich von Gaertner

Karl Friedrich von Gaertner (or Carl Friedrich von Gärtner) (1 May 1772 – 1 September 1850) was a well-known German botanist, and the son of Joseph Gaertner. He was a pioneer in the study of hybrids, and he is considered an important influence on Gregor Mendel.

Gärtner, who was a protestant, challenged the doctrine of Carl Linnaeus of the "new special creation" which stated that new species of vegetation could arise through hybridization. He defended the stability of species, and argued that although the transmutation of species was evidently possible, the new species would not last because of a law of reversion which prevented them from spreading freely. As was reported in the words of Mendel:

Gärtner by the results of [his] transformation experiments, was led to oppose the opinion of those naturalists who dispute the stability of plant species and believe in a continuous evolution of vegetation. He perceives in the complete transformation of one species into another an indubitable proof that species are fixed within limits beyond which they cannot change. Although this opinion cannot be unconditionally accepted we find on the other hand in Gärtner's experiments a noteworthy confirmation of that supposition regarding variability of cultivated plants which has already been expressed.

— Mendel (1865)

Gärtner is mentioned 17 times in Gregor Mendel's short famous paper Experiments on Plant Hybridization and 32 times in the first edition of Charles Darwin's On the Origin of Species. He also is the most cited by nominal appearances in the sixth edition of the Origin.
