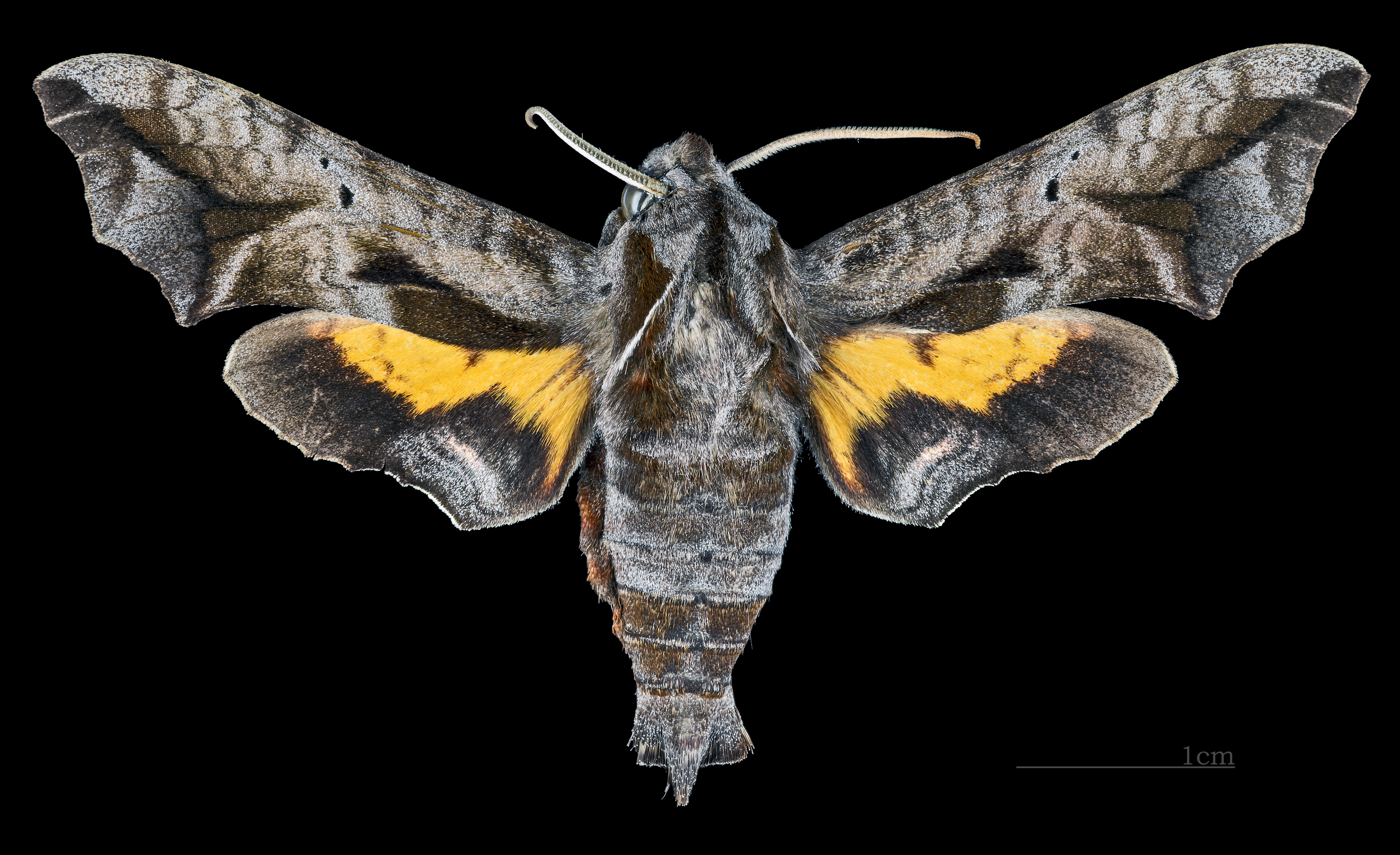
- Nyceryx continua continua male dorsal
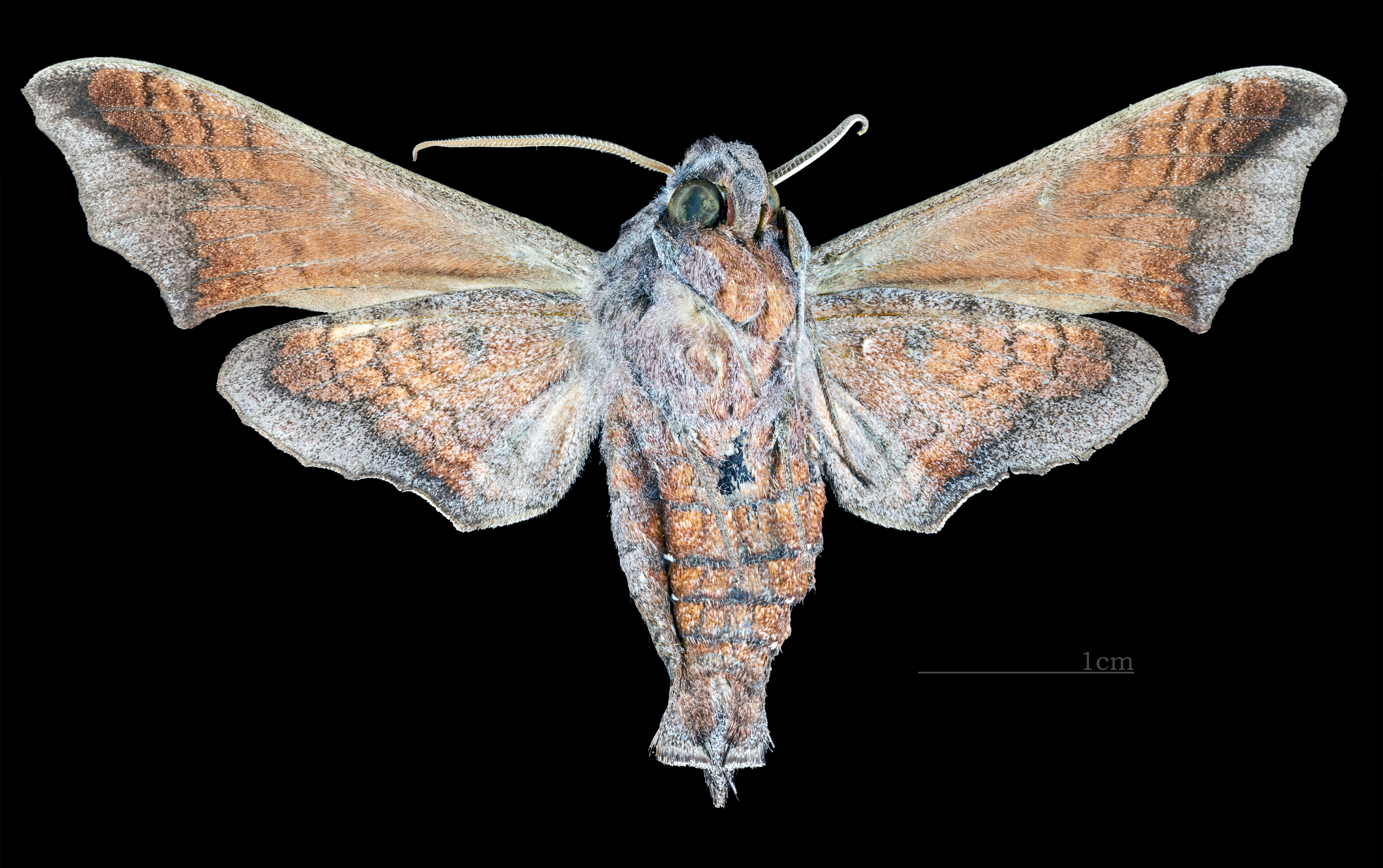
- Nyceryx continua continua male ventral

Scientific classification
- Domain: Eukaryota
- Kingdom: Animalia
- Phylum: Arthropoda
- Class: Insecta
- Order: Lepidoptera
- Family: Sphingidae
- Genus: Nyceryx
- Species: N. continua

Binomial name
- Nyceryx continua (Walker, 1856)

Synonyms
- Lophura continua Walker, 1856; Nyceryx lemonia Gehlen, 1941; Perigonia distans Boisduval, 1875

= Nyceryx continua =

Species of moth

Nyceryx continua is a moth of the family Sphingidae. It is found from Peru, Bolivia, Argentina and Brazil.

The wingspan is 56–72 mm. There are no or faint lines in the basal costal area of the forewing upperside. The antemedian band is filled with black and is very oblique. The discal spot is rather large and the dot in front of it is distinct. The apical black half-moon dot is distinctly separate from the black marginal area. The hindwing upperside has a yellow basal area extending to the inner margin.

Adults are probably on wing year round and have been recorded in August in Bolivia and in November in Peru.

== Subspecies ==
- Nyceryx continua continua (Brazil)
- Nyceryx continua cratera Rothschild & Jordan, 1916 (Peru, Bolivia, Argentina and Brazil)
