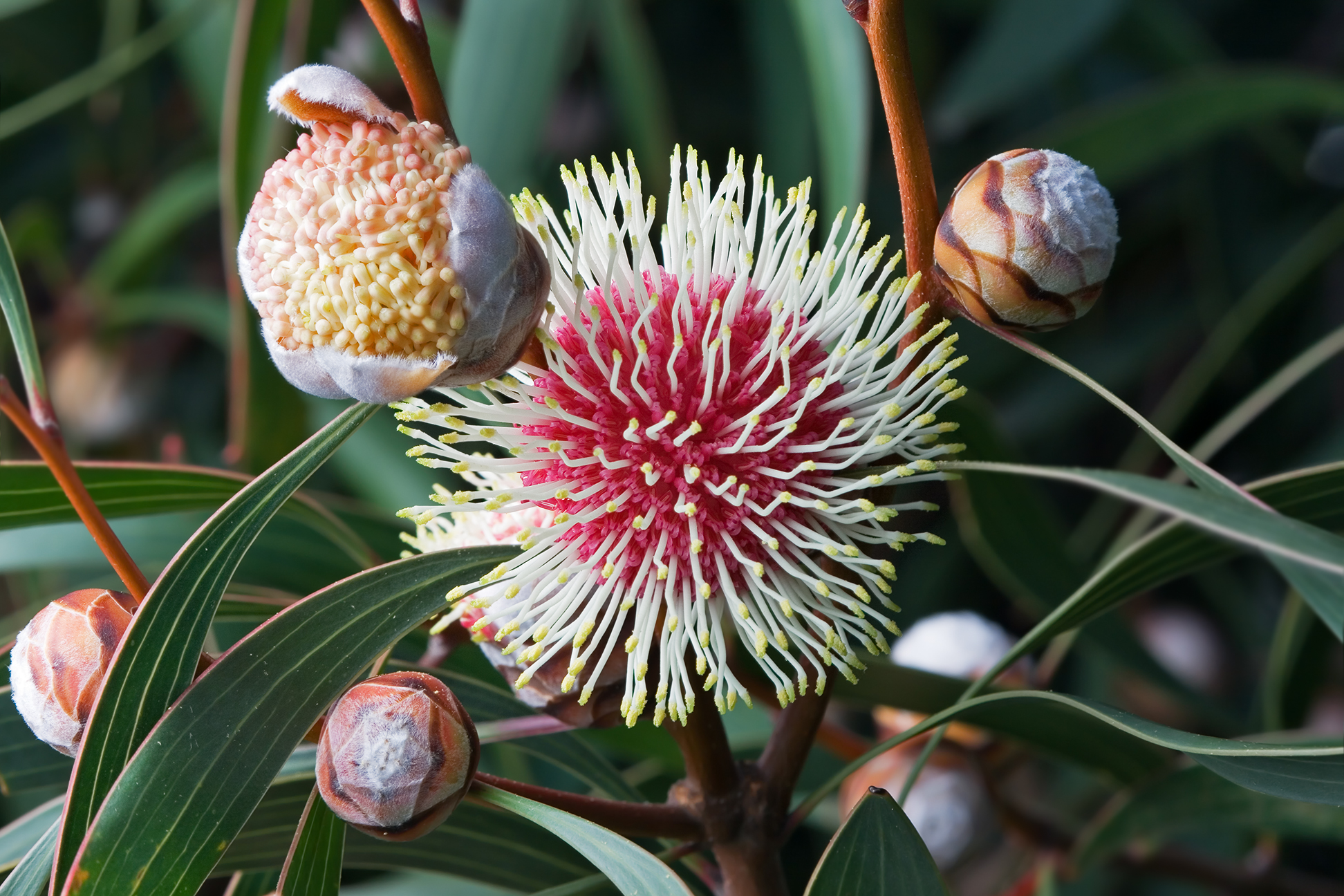
- Hakea laurina (pin-cushion hakea)

Scientific classification
- Kingdom: Plantae
- Clade: Embryophytes
- Clade: Tracheophytes
- Clade: Spermatophytes
- Clade: Angiosperms
- Clade: Eudicots
- Order: Proteales
- Family: Proteaceae
- Subfamily: Grevilleoideae
- Tribe: Embothrieae
- Subtribe: Hakeinae
- Genus: Hakea; Schrad. & J.C.Wendl.

Type species
- Hakea teretifolia

Species
- See text

= Hakea =

Genus of plants endemic to Australia

Hakea (/ˈhɑːkiə, ˈheɪkiə/ HAH-kee-ə, HAY-) is a genus of about 150 species of flowering plants in the family Proteaceae, endemic to Australia. They are shrubs or small trees with leaves that are sometimes flat, otherwise circular in cross section in which case they are sometimes divided. The flowers are usually arranged in groups in leaf axils and resemble those of other genera, especially Grevillea. Hakeas have woody fruit which distinguishes them from grevilleas which have non-woody fruit which release the seeds as they mature. Hakeas are found in every state of Australia with the highest species diversity being found in the south west of Western Australia.

== Description ==
Plants in the genus Hakea are shrubs or small trees. Some species have flat leaves, whilst others have leaves which are needle-like, in which case they are sometimes divided and sometimes have a groove on the lower surface. The flowers are arranged in groups in leaf axils and are surrounded by bracts when in bud. The flowers have both male and female parts and are borne on a short stalk called a pedicel. The sepals and petals, jointly called tepals, form a curved tube which sometimes splits open as the flower develops. The style is longer than the tepal tube and is curved before its tip is released. When released, the tip of the style is a pollen-presenter. The fruit of hakeas is woody and persists on the plant until burned in a bushfire or until the plant dies. The fruit then splits open to release two winged seeds.

Hakeas are similar to other plants in the Family Proteaceae, but have undivided leaves arranged alternately, sessile flowers arranged in loose groups in the axils of leaves or bracts, unlike those in the Banksia. Hakeas are similar to species of Grevillea but are distinguished from them in having persistent, woody fruits. (Those of grevilleas are not persistent and not woody. The upper and lower surfaces of the leaves of hakeas are similar (dissimilar in grevilleas), and the ovary and style are glabrous (but hairy in grevilleas).

== Taxonomy and naming ==
The genus Hakea was first formally described in 1797 by Heinrich Schrader and Johann Christoph Wendland and the description was published in Sertum Hannoveranum. The genus is named after Baron Christian Ludwig von Hake, an 18th-century German patron of botany.

== Distribution ==
Hakea are endemic to Australia, where they can be found in all six states. Some species, such as Hakea sericea, have been introduced elsewhere, where they have become naturalized and may be considered invasive. Introduced Hakea populations occur in New Zealand, Norfolk Island, South Africa and Portugal.

== Horticulture ==
Hakeas are popular ornamental plants in gardens in Australia, and in many locations are as common as grevilleas and banksias. Several hybrids and cultivars have been developed, including Hakea 'Burrendong Beauty'. They are best grown in beds of light soil which are watered but still well drained.

Some showy western species, such as Hakea multilineata, H. francisiana and H. bucculenta, require grafting onto hardy stock such as Hakea salicifolia for growing in more humid climates, as they are sensitive to dieback.

Many species, particularly eastern Australian species, are notable for their hardiness, to the point they have become weedy. Hakea gibbosa, H. sericea, and H. drupacea (previously H. suaveolens) have been weeds in South Africa, Hakea laurina has become naturalized in the eastern states of Australia and is considered an environmental weed, and H. salicifolia, H. gibbosa, and H. sericea are invasive weeds in New Zealand.

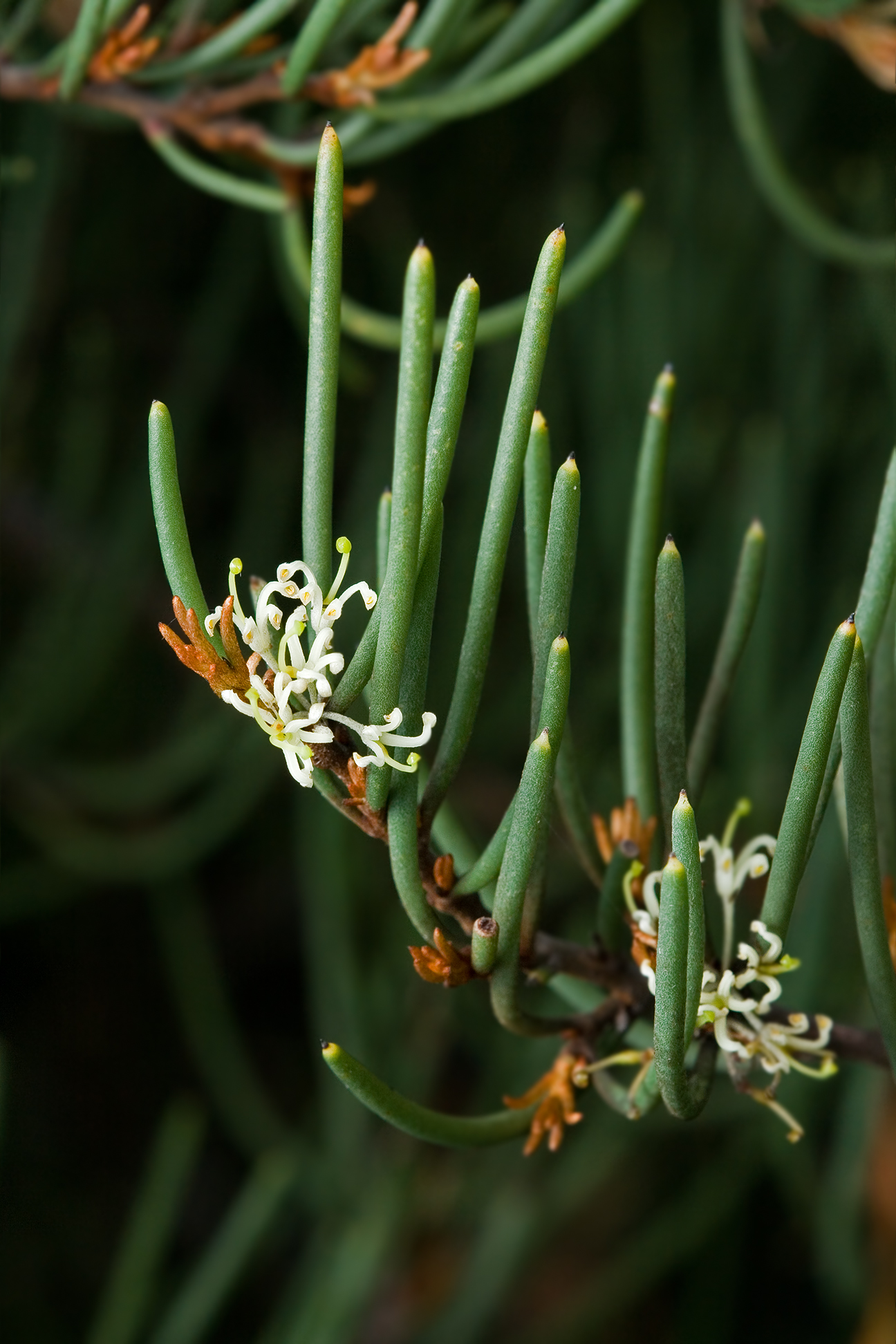
Hakea epiglottis

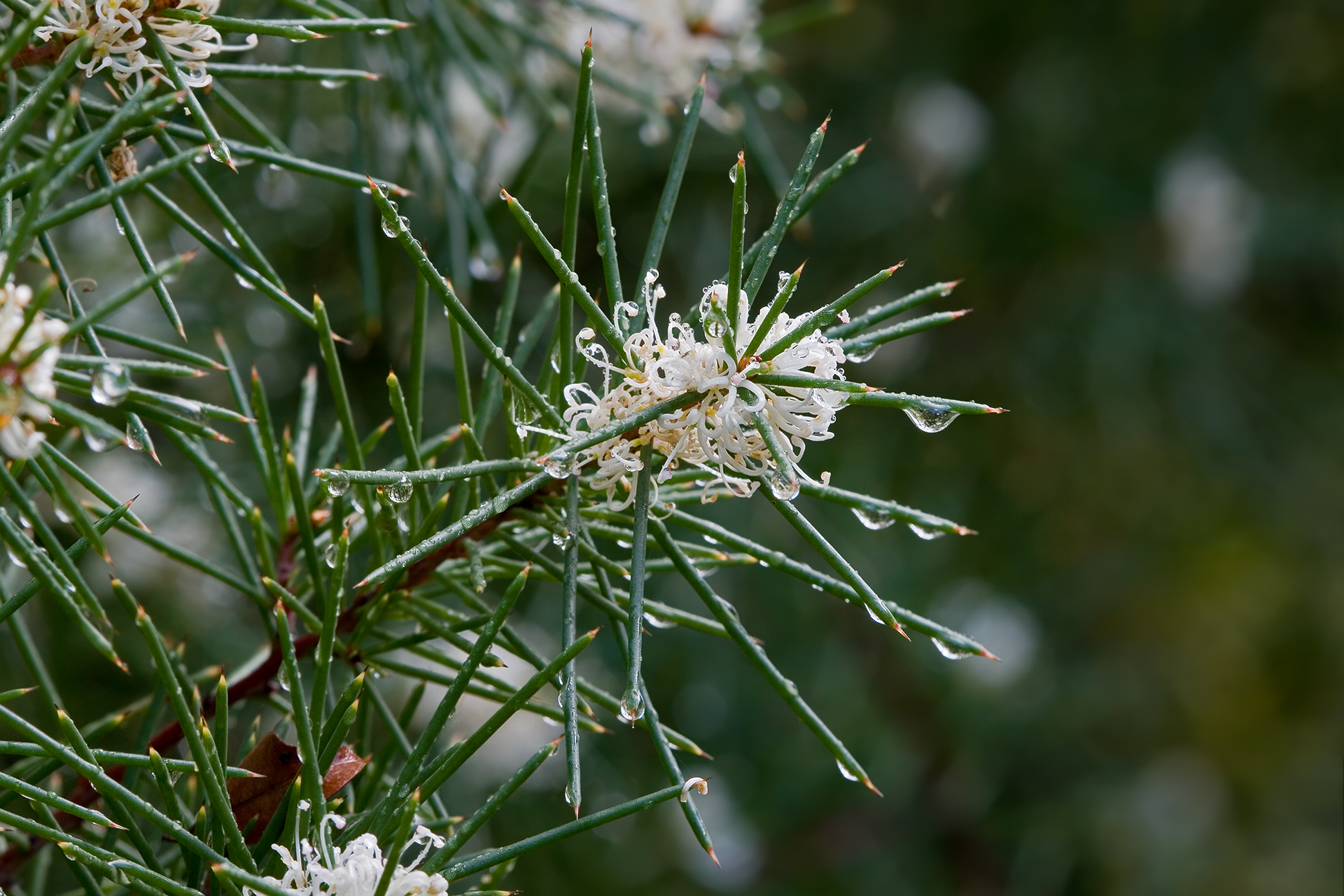
Hakea decurrens subsp. physocarpa

== List of species ==
The following is a list of Hakea species recognised by the Australian Plant Census, except for Hakea asperma which is recognised by the Royal Botanic Gardens Victoria:

- Hakea actites W.R.Barker – mulloway needlebush, wallum hakea
- Hakea aculeata A.S.George – column hakea
- Hakea acuminata Haegi
- Hakea adnata R.Br.
- Hakea aenigma W.R.Barker & Haegi – enigma hakea
- Hakea ambigua Meisn.
- Hakea amplexicaulis R.Br. – prickly hakea
- Hakea anadenia Haegi
- Hakea arborescens R.Br. – common hakea, yellow hakea
- Hakea archaeoides W.R.Barker
- Hakea asperma Molyneux & Forrester – native dog hakea
- Hakea auriculata Meisn.
- Hakea bakeriana F.Muell. & Maiden
- Hakea baxteri R.Br. – fan hakea
- Hakea bicornata R.M.Barker
- Hakea brachyptera Meisn. – short-winged hakea
- Hakea brownii Meisn. – fan-leaf hakea
- Hakea bucculenta C.A.Gardner – red pokers
- Hakea candolleana Meisn.
- Hakea carinata F.Muell. ex Meisn.
- Hakea ceratophylla (Sm.) R.Br. – horned-leaf hakea, staghorn hakea
- Hakea chordophylla F.Muell. – bootlace oak, bootlace tree, corkwood, bull oak
- Hakea chromatropa A.S.George & R.M.Barker
- Hakea cinerea R.Br.
- Hakea circumalata Meisn.
- Hakea clavata Labill. – coastal hakea
- Hakea collina C.T.White
- Hakea commutata F.Muell.
- Hakea conchifolia Hook.f. – shell-leaved hakea
- Hakea constablei L.A.S.Johnson
- Hakea corymbosa R.Br. – cauliflower hakea
- Hakea costata Meisn. – ribbed hakea
- Hakea cristata R.Br.
- Hakea cucullata R.Br. – hood-leaved hakea, scallop hakea
- Hakea cyclocarpa Lindl. – ramshorn hakea
- Hakea cycloptera R.Br.
- Hakea cygnus Lamont
  - Hakea cygnus Lamont subsp. cygnus – swan-fruit hakea
  - Hakea cygna subsp. needlei Lamont
- Hakea dactyloides Gaertn. – finger hakea
- Hakea decurrens R.Br.
  - Hakea decurrens R.Br. subsp. decurrens
  - Hakea decurrens subsp. physocarpa W.R.Barker
  - Hakea decurrens subsp. platytaenia W.R.Barker
- Hakea denticulata R.Br. – stinking Roger
- Hakea divaricata L.A.S.Johnson – needlewood, corkbark tree, fork-leaved corkwood
- Hakea dohertyi Haegi
- Hakea drupacea (C.F.Gaertn.) Roem. & Schult.
- Hakea ednieana Tate – Flinders Range hakea, yandena
- Hakea elliptica (Sm.) R.Br. – oval-leaf hakea
- Hakea eneabba Haegi
- Hakea epiglottis Labill.
  - Hakea epiglottis Labill. subsp. epiglottis
  - Hakea epiglottis subsp. milliganii (Meisn.) R.M.Barker
- Hakea erecta Lamont
- Hakea eriantha R.Br. – tree hakea
- Hakea erinacea Meisn. – hedgehog hakea, porcupine hakea
- Hakea eyreana (S.Moore) McGill – straggly corkbark
- Hakea falcata R.Br. – sickle hakea
- Hakea ferruginea Sweet
- Hakea flabellifolia Meisn. – fan-leaved hakea, wedge hakea
- Hakea florida R.Br.
- Hakea florulenta Meisn.
- Hakea francisiana F.Muell. – emu tree, grass-leaf hakea, bottlebrush hakea
- Hakea fraseri R.Br. – corkwood oak
- Hakea gibbosa (Sm.) Cav. – hairy hakea, rock hakea
- Hakea gilbertii Kippist
- Hakea grammatophylla (F.Muell.) F.Muell.
- Hakea hastata Haegi
- Hakea hookeriana Meisn. – Barren Range hakea
- Hakea horrida R.M.Barker
- Hakea ilicifolia R.Br.
- Hakea incrassata R.Br. – marble hakea
- Hakea invaginata B.L.Burtt
- Hakea ivoryi F.M.Bailey – Ivory's hakea, corkwood, corkbark tree
- Hakea kippistiana Meisn.
- Hakea laevipes Gand.
  - Hakea laevipes subsp. graniticola Haegi
  - Hakea laevipes Gand. subsp. laevipes
- Hakea lasiantha R.Br. – woolly-flowered hakea
- Hakea lasianthoides Rye
- Hakea lasiocarpha R.Br. – long-styled hakea
- Hakea laurina R.Br. – kodjet, pin-cushion hakea, emu bush
- Hakea lehmanniana Meisn. – blue hakea
- Hakea leucoptera R.Br. – silver needlewood, needle hakea, pin bush, water tree, booldoobah
  - Hakea leucoptera R.Br. subsp. leucoptera
  - Hakea leucoptera subsp. sericipes W.R.Barker
- Hakea linearis R.Br.
- Hakea lissocarpha R.Br. – honey bush, honeybush hakea
- Hakea lissosperma R.Br. – needle bush, mountain needlewood
- Hakea longiflora (Benth.) R.M.Barker
- Hakea loranthifolia Meisn.
- Hakea lorea (R.Br.) R.Br. – bootlace oak, cork tree
  - Hakea lorea subsp. borealis W.R.Barker
  - Hakea lorea (R.Br.) R.Br. subsp. lorea
- Hakea maconochieana Haegi
- Hakea macraeana F.Muell. – willow needlewood, Macrae's hakea
- Hakea macrocarpa A.Cunn. ex R.Br. – dogwood hakea
- Hakea macrorrhyncha W.R.Barker
- Hakea marginata R.Br.
- Hakea megadenia R.M.Barker
- Hakea megalosperma Meisn. – Lesueur hakea
- Hakea meisneriana Kippist
- Hakea microcarpa R.Br. – small-fruit hakea
- Hakea minyma Maconochie
- Hakea mitchellii Meisn.
- Hakea multilineata Meisn. – grass-leaf hakea
- Hakea myrtoides Meisn. – myrtle hakea
- Hakea neospathulata (formerly spathulata)
- Hakea neurophylla Meisn. – pink-flowered hakea
- Hakea newbeyana R.M.Barker
- Hakea nitida R.Br. – frog hakea, shining hakea
- Hakea nodosa R.Br. – yellow hakea
- Hakea obliqua R.Br. – needles and corks
  - Hakea obliqua R.Br. subsp. obliqua
  - Hakea obliqua subsp. parviflora R.M.Barker
- Hakea obtusa Meisn.
- Hakea ochroptera W.R.Barker
- Hakea oldfieldii Benth.
- Hakea oleifolia (Sm.) R.Br. – dungyn, olive-leaf hakea
- Hakea oligoneura K.A.Sheph. & R.M.Barker
- Hakea orthorrhyncha F.Muell. – bird beak hakea
  - Hakea orthorrhyncha var. filiformis F.Muell. ex Benth.
  - Hakea orthorrhyncha F.Muell. ex Benth. var. orthorrhyncha
- Hakea pachyphylla Sieber ex Spreng.
- Hakea pandanicarpa R.Br.
  - Hakea pandanicarpa subsp. crassifolia (Meisn.) R.M.Barker
  - Hakea pandanicarpaR.Br. subsp. pandanicarpa
- Hakea pedunculata F.Muell.
- Hakea pendens R.M.Barker
- Hakea persiehana F.Muell.
- Hakea petiolaris Meisn. – sea-urchin hakea
  - Hakea petiolaris subsp. angusta Haegi
  - Hakea petiolaris Meisn. subsp. petiolaris
  - Hakea petiolaris subsp. trichophylla Haegi
- Hakea platysperma Hook. – cricket ball hakea, woody peach
- Hakea polyanthema Diels
- Hakea preissii Meisn. – needle tree, needle bush, Christmas hakea
- Hakea pritzelii Diels
- Hakea propinqua A.Cunn.
- Hakea prostrata R.Br. – harsh hakea
- Hakea psilorrhyncha R.M.Barker
- Hakea pulvinifera L.A.S.Johnson - Lake Keepit hakea
- Hakea purpurea Hook.
- Hakea pycnoneura Meisn.
- Hakea recurva Meisn. – djarnokmurd
  - Hakea recurva subsp. arida (Diels) W.R.Barker & R.M.Barker
  - Hakea recurva Meisn. subsp. recurva
- Hakea repullulans H.M.Lee
- Hakea rhombales F.Muell. – walukara
- Hakea rigida C.A.Gardner ex Haegi
- Hakea rostrata F.Muell. ex Meisn.
- Hakea rugosa R.Br. – wrinkled hakea
- Hakea ruscifolia Labill. – candle hakea
- Hakea salicifolia (Vent.) B.L.Burtt – willow-leaved hakea
  - Hakea salicifolia subsp. angustifolia (A.A.Ham.) W.R.Barker
  - Hakea salicifolia (Vent.) B.L.Burtt subsp. salicifolia
- Hakea scoparia Meisn.
  - Hakea scoparia Meisn. subsp. scoparia
  - Hkea scoparia subsp. trycherica Haegi
- Hakea sericea Schrad. & J.C.Wendl. – needlebush, silky hakea
- Hakea smilacifolia Meisn.
- Hakea standleyensis Maconochie
- Hakea stenocarpa R.Br.
- Hakea stenophylla A.Cunn. ex R.Br.
  - Hakea stenophylla subsp. notialis R.M.Barker
  - Hakea stenophylla A.Cunn. ex R.Br. subsp. stenophylla
- Hakea strumosa Meisn.
- Hakea subsulcata Meisn.
- Hakea sulcata R.Br.
- Hakea tephrosperma R.Br. – hooked needlewood
- Hakea teretifolia (Salisb.) Britten – dagger hakea
- Hakea teretifolia subsp. hirsuta (Endl.) R.M.Barker
- Hakea teretifolia (Salisb.) Britten subsp. teretifolia
- Hakea trifurcata (Sm.) R.Br. – two-leaf, two-leaved hakea, kerosine bush
- Hakea trineura F.Muell. F.Muell.
- Hakea tuberculata R.Br.
- Hakea ulicina R.Br. - furze hakea (W.A.)
- Hakea undulata R.Br. – wavy-leaved hakea
- Hakea varia R.Br. –variable-leaved hakea
- Hakea verrucosa F.Muell.
- Hakea victoria J.Drumm. – lantern hakea, royal hakea
- Hakea vittata R.Br.
