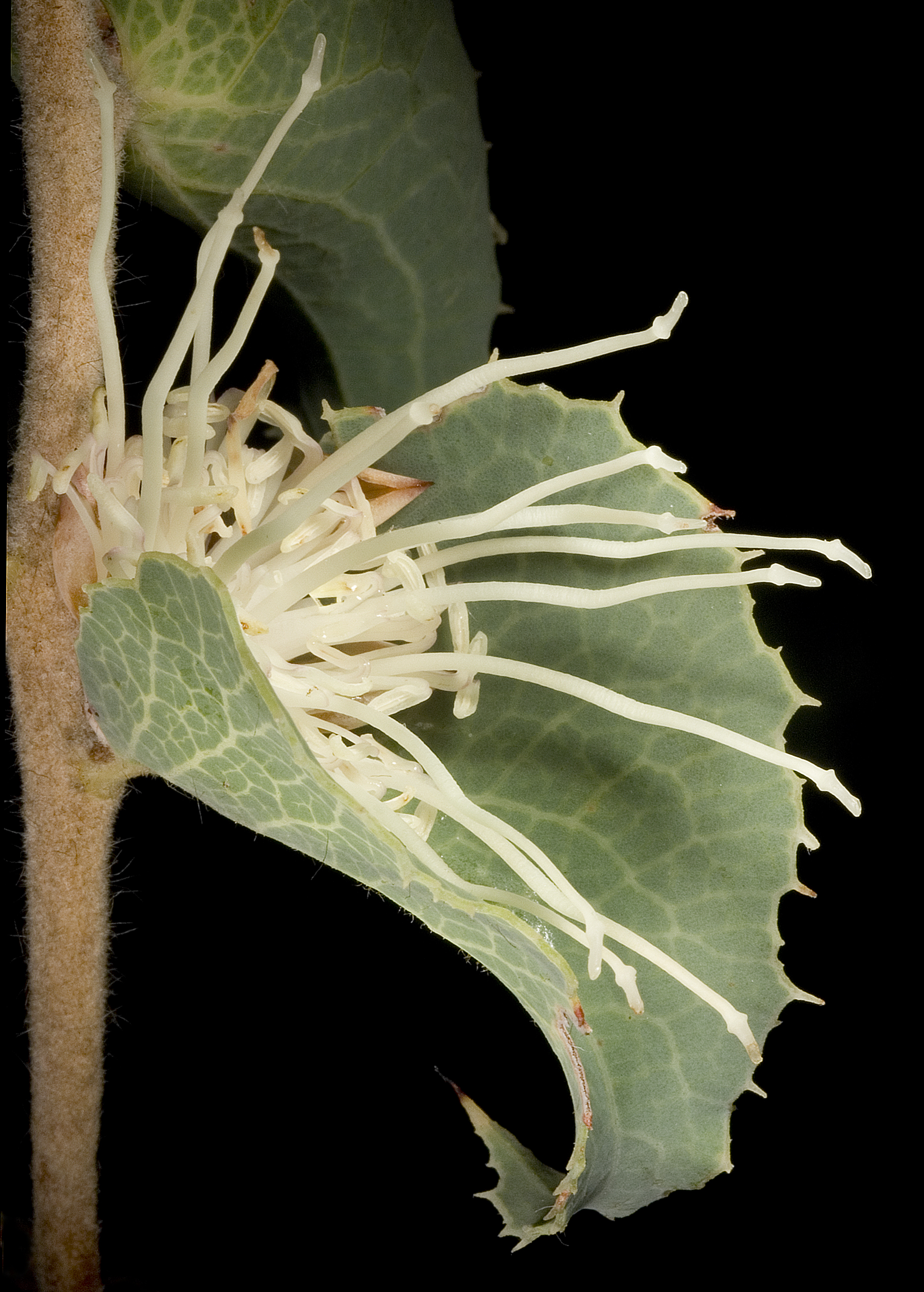

Scientific classification
- Kingdom: Plantae
- Clade: Tracheophytes
- Clade: Angiosperms
- Clade: Eudicots
- Order: Proteales
- Family: Proteaceae
- Genus: Hakea
- Species: H. conchifolia

Binomial name
- Hakea conchifolia Hook.
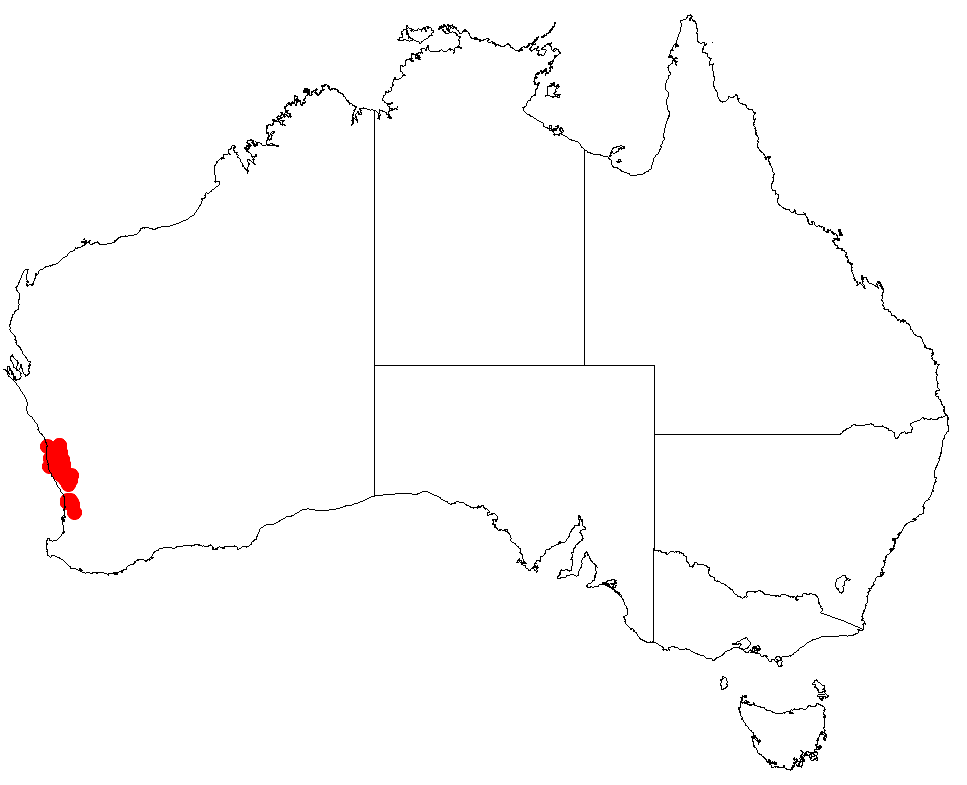
- Occurrence data from Australasian Virtual Herbarium

= Hakea conchifolia =

Shell-leaved hakea

Species of shrub native to Western Australia

Hakea conchifolia, commonly known as the shell-leaved hakea, is a shrub in the family Proteaceae native to an area in the west coast of the Wheatbelt region of Western Australia. An attractive small species with unusual rigid leaves that encircle the flowers.

== Description ==
Hakea conchifolia is a small to dwarf lignotuberous shrub growing to a height of 0.3 to 1 metre (1.0 to 3.3 ft) with erect smaller branches. The branch surface varies and may be covered with red-brown long soft hairs, coarse rough longish hairs or densely covered in short soft matted hairs fading at flowering. The shell-like rigid leaves are 3–7.5 cm (1–3 in) long and 30–70 mm (1–3 in) wide when opened, growing alternately on branches. Grey-green leaves are hairless, widest near the stem divided both sides of a central stalk in a feather-like appearance. Most leaves are broadly egg-shaped or heart-shaped with sharply scalloped edges, doubled over encircling the flowers. The inflorescence appears in the leaf axil and consists of 15–18 flowers. The pedicel is 2.7–3 mm (0.1–0.1 in) long and smooth. The perianth is creamy white rarely pale pink and the style 24–28 mm (0.9–1 in) long. The egg-shaped fruit are 20–25 mm (0.8–1 in) long and 10–12 mm (0.4–0.5 in) wide tapering to a short beak. Creamy-white rarely pink flowers appear in winter from June to August.

== Taxonomy and naming ==
Hakea conchifolia was first formally described by the botanist William Jackson Hooker in 1842 as part of the work Icones Plantarum. The only synonyms are Hakea cucullata and Hakea cucullata var. conchifolia. The specific epithet (conchifolia) is derived from the Latin words concha meaning "snail" or "shell" and folium meaning "leaf" referring to the resemblance of the leaves to sea shells.

== Distribution and habitat ==
Shell-leaved hakea grows in the northern sand plains of Irwin south to the foothills of the Darling Ranges of Perth. Hakea conchifolia grows in sand, loam and gravelly soils in heathland or low woodland in areas of good drainage.

== Conservation status ==
Hakea conchifolia is classified as "not threatened" by the Western Australian Government Department of Parks and Wildlife.
