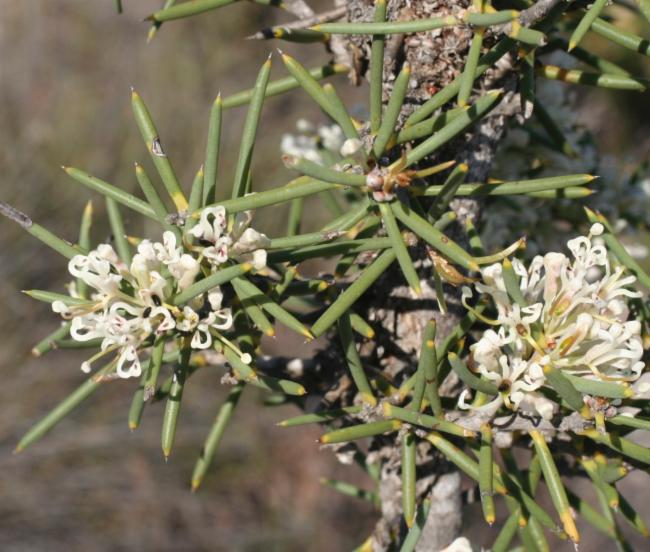

Scientific classification
- Kingdom: Plantae
- Clade: Tracheophytes
- Clade: Angiosperms
- Clade: Eudicots
- Order: Proteales
- Family: Proteaceae
- Genus: Hakea
- Species: H. psilorrhyncha

Binomial name
- Hakea psilorrhyncha R.M.Barker
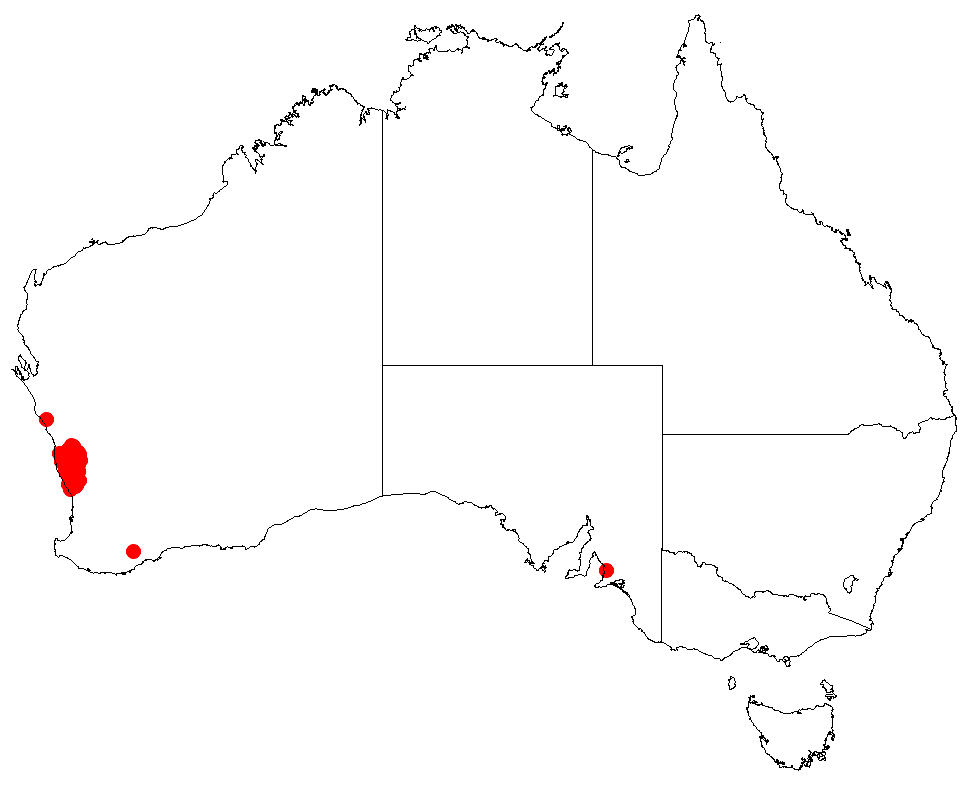
- Occurrence data from Australasian Virtual Herbarium

= Hakea psilorrhyncha =

Species of shrub native to Western Australia

Hakea psilorrhyncha is a flowering plant in the family Proteaceae, it is endemic to a small area on the west coast in the Wheatbelt and Mid West regions of Western Australia. It has needle-shaped, sharply pointed leaves and clusters of scented brownish yellow flowers.

== Description ==
Hakea psilorrhyncha is an erect very prickly shrub typically growing to a height of 1 to 4 metres (3.3 to 13.1 ft) with a slender growth habit and does not form a lignotuber. The terete leaves grow alternately on branchlets and are 2–10 cm (0.8–4 in) long and 1.5–2.5 mm (0.059–0.098 in) wide ending with a very sharp point. The branchlets and new leaf growth is a rusty colour. The inflorescence consists of 6–8 sweetly scented brown-yellow clusters of flowers in the leaf axils on a stem 5–5.5 mm (0.20–0.22 in) long. The pedicel is 6–8 mm (0.24–0.31 in) long and thickly covered in cream-white to deep yellow, flattened silky hairs. The perianth 6.5–9 mm (0.26–0.35 in) long and the pistil 10–11 mm (0.39–0.43 in) long. The large ovoid fruit are rough and corky 3–5 cm (1–2 in) long by 1.5–2.5 cm (0.6–1 in) wide ending with a curving short beak. Flowering occurs from September to October.

== Taxonomy and naming ==
Hakea psilorrhyncha was first formally described in 1990 by Robyn Mary Barker and the description was published in Flora of Australia. It was named from the Greek psilos (smooth) and rhynchos (snout) referring to the beak of the fruit.

== Distribution and habitat ==
This hakea grows in mallee or open heath on deep sand, loam or clay from Geraldton and south to Moore River National Park.

== Conservation status ==
Hakea psilorrhyncha is classified as "not threatened" by the Western Australian Government Department of Parks and Wildlife.
