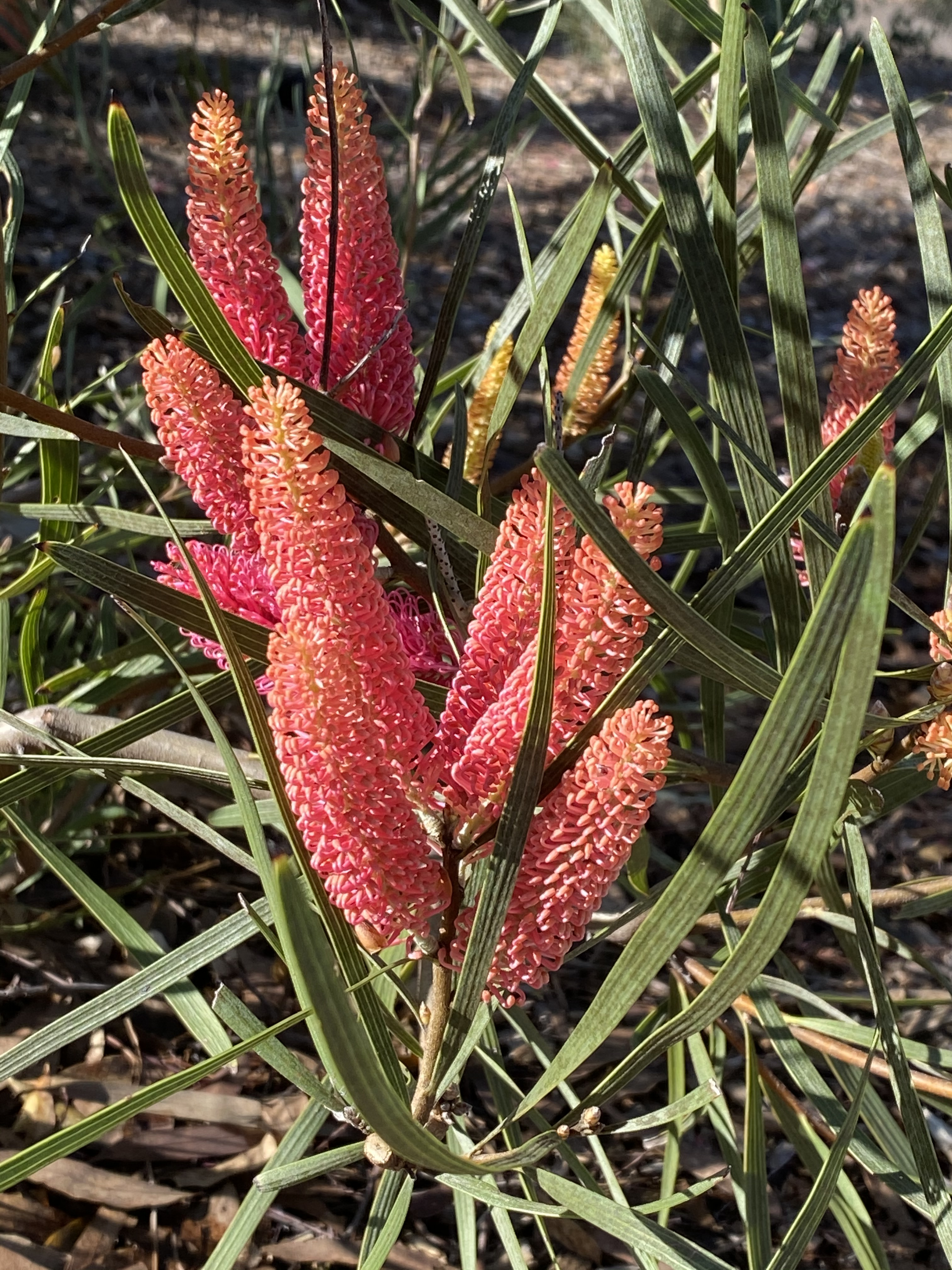

Scientific classification
- Kingdom: Plantae
- Clade: Tracheophytes
- Clade: Angiosperms
- Clade: Eudicots
- Order: Proteales
- Family: Proteaceae
- Genus: Hakea
- Species: H. grammatophylla

Binomial name
- Hakea grammatophylla (F.Muell.) F.Muell.
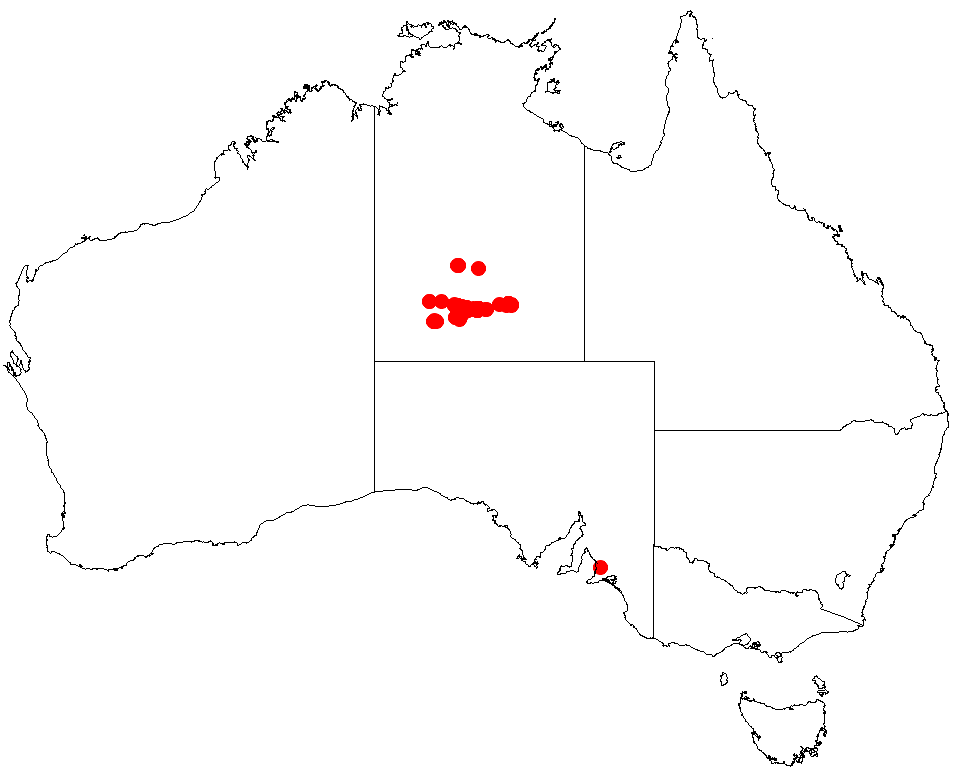
- Occurrence data from AVH

= Hakea grammatophylla =

Species of shrub endemic to Australia

Hakea grammatophylla is a shrub of the family Proteaceae that is endemic to the Northern Territory, Australia. It is a variable, sparsely branched shrub with pink to reddish flowers from March to late winter.

== Description ==
Hakea grammatophylla is a small variable shrub growing to a height of 0.5 to 3.5 metres (2 to 11 ft) sometimes erect but sparsely branched. The branchlets are either thickly or sparingly covered with flattened hairs becoming more or less smooth at flowering. The leaves are long, flat, and narrowly egg-shaped 8 to 20 centimetres (3 to 8 in) long, 0.4 to 1 centimetre (0.2 to 0.4 in) wide with 5–9 distinct veins. The inflorescence consists of 100–150 red to deep pink scented blooms in a raceme on a stem 2–5 cm (0.79–1.97 in) long that is covered with short, soft matted hairs. The pedicel is smooth, perianth bright pink and smooth and the pistil 13–16 mm (0.51–0.63 in) long. Flowering occurs mostly from March to August. The fruit are narrow and fairly smooth about 2–2.5 cm (0.8–1 in) long tapering to a point.

== Taxonomy and naming ==
The species was first formally described by the botanist Ferdinand von Mueller in 1868 and the description was published in Fragmenta Phytographiae Australiae. The specific epithet (grammatophylla) is derived from the Latin grammatus- meaning "striped with fine lines" and -phyllum meaning "leaf", referring to the prominent fine veins in the leaves.

== Distribution and habitat ==
A rare species confined to the MacDonnell Ranges extending from the George Gill Ranges in the west to the White Range in the east growing in soil pockets amongst rocky slopes and river gorges.

== Conservation status ==
Hakea grammatophylla is considered rare due to its restricted distribution by Briggs and Leigh 1995.
