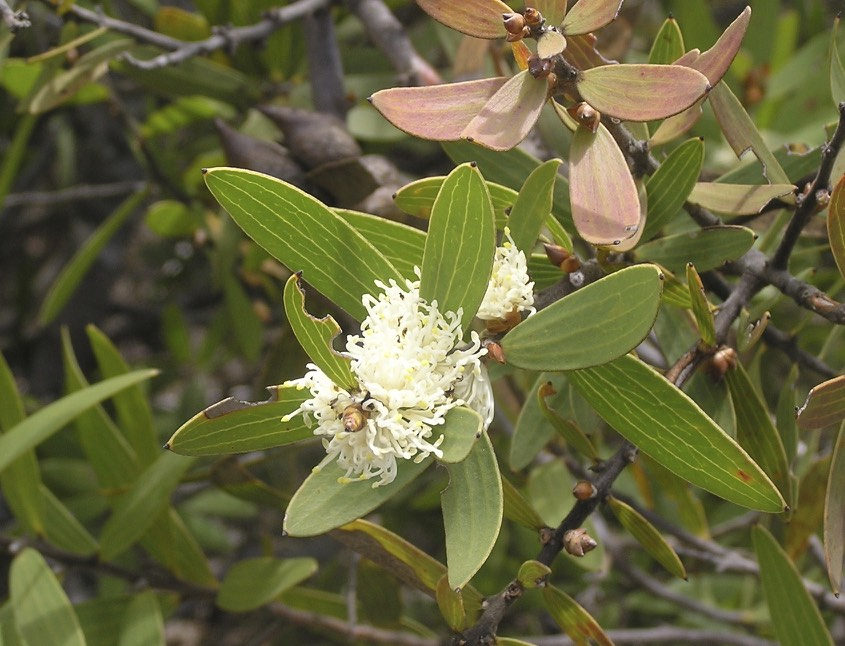
- Hakea ambigua in the Stirling Range National Park

Scientific classification
- Kingdom: Plantae
- Clade: Tracheophytes
- Clade: Angiosperms
- Clade: Eudicots
- Order: Proteales
- Family: Proteaceae
- Genus: Hakea
- Species: H. ambigua

Binomial name
- Hakea ambigua Meisn.
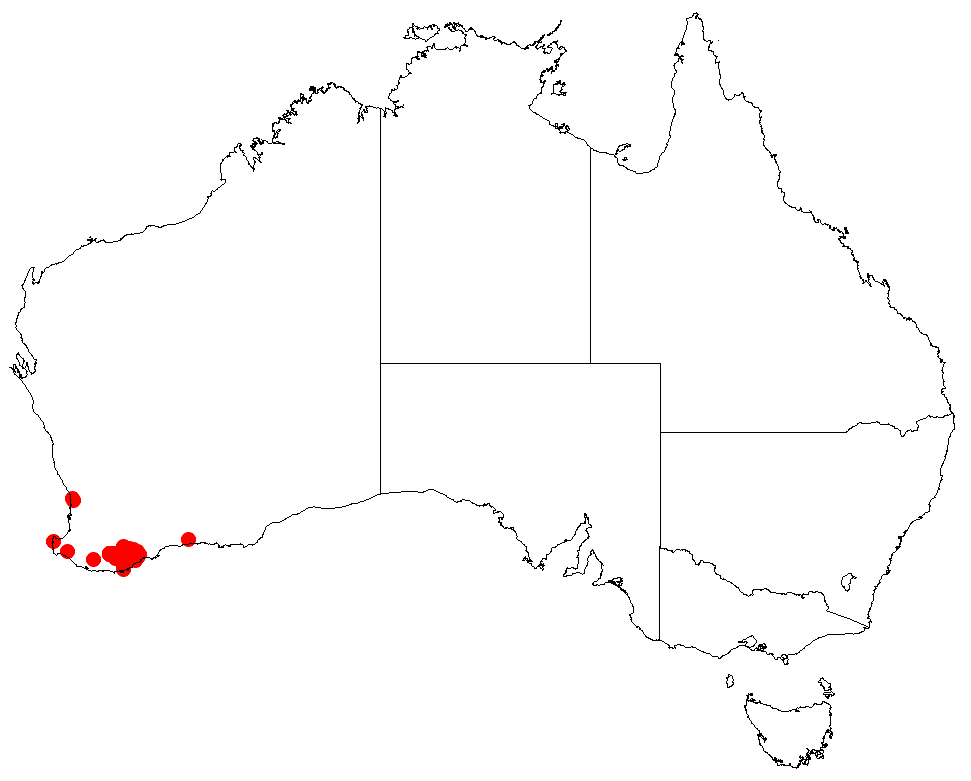
- Occurrence data from Australasian Virtual Herbarium

Synonyms
- Hakea trinervis Meisn.

= Hakea ambigua =

Species of shrub native to Western Australia

Hakea ambigua is a shrub in the family Proteaceae. In favourable conditions may grow into an attractive weeping shrub with creamy white flowers. Only found in the Stirling Ranges of southern Western Australia.

== Description ==
Hakea ambigua is a non lignotuberous upright opened branched shrub to 1 to 3 m (3 to 10 ft) tall with smooth grey bark. Smaller branches hairy. Smooth mid-green leaves are arranged alternately on the stem 40–100 mm (2–4 in) long and 5–18 mm (0.2–0.7 in) wide. Leaves are wider in the middle with three longitudinal veins on both sides ending in a blunt point. Pedicels 3–4 mm (0.1–0.2 in) long, perianth is 5–6 mm (0.2–0.2 in) long and smooth, the style without hairs. The sweetly scented creamy white or yellow flowers, occasionally with a pink tinge, appear in the leaf axils from August to October. The smooth rounded fruit are up to 4 cm (2 in) long by 1–1.5 cm (0.39–0.59 in) wide and taper to a prominent beak. Hakea ambigua may be used for erosion control, hedging and wildlife habitat.

== Taxonomy ==
Hakea ambigua was first formally described by botanist Carl Meissner in 1848 who published the description in Johann Georg Christian Lehmann's book Plantae Preissianae. The type specimen was collected by James Drummond near the Swan River. The specific epithet (ambigua) is derived from the Latin word ambiguus meaning "of double meaning", "doubtful" or "uncertain" considered to be a reference by Meisner having doubts "about the species relationships".

== Distribution and habitat ==
Hakea ambigua is found in areas along the south coast in the Great Southern and South West regions of Western Australia. The bulk of the population is confined to the Stirling Range. It is found on hillslopes, growing mostly in shrubland and mallee in sandy rocky quartzitic soil and gravelly loam. It requires a sunny aspect on a well-drained site.
