= Hakea acuminata =

Conservation status
- Priority Two — Poorly Known Taxa (DEC)

Scientific classification
- Kingdom: Plantae
- Clade: Tracheophytes
- Clade: Angiosperms
- Clade: Eudicots
- Order: Proteales
- Family: Proteaceae
- Genus: Hakea
- Species: H. acuminata

Binomial name
- Hakea acuminata Haegi

Species of shrub native to Western Australia

Hakea acuminata is a shrub of the family Proteaceae native to Western Australia. A restricted species bearing clusters of white flowers with a green or pinkish tinge in late autumn to winter.

== Description ==
Hakea acuminata is a multi-branched shrub growing to 0.5 to 1.8 metres (1.6 to 5.9 ft) high, with smooth grey bark. Its leaves are shiny, rich green with a yellow tinge at the base, almost flat and partially whorled in the higher flowering branches. The leaves are concave, narrowly oval to egg-shaped 3 to 12 centimetres (1.2 to 4.7 in) long and 9 to 38 millimetres (0.354 to 1.496 in) wide. There are up to three prominent longitudinal veins on both sides of the leaves. The inflorescence has 16 to 24 flowers appearing in racemes in leaf axils. The perianth is a cream-yellow and the style is long and prominent. The pistil is 34–37 mm (1–1 in) long. Egg-shaped woody fruit grow singly or in pairs 25 to 31 mm (1.0 to 1.2 in) long and 16 to 21 mm (0.63 to 0.83 in) wide. The fruit become corky as they age and have little or no beak. The seeds are blackish-brown, obliquely egg-shaped 18 to 21 mm (0.71 to 0.83 in) long and 9 to 10 mm (0.354 to 0.394 in) wide with a wing extending down both sides of body. From May to October clusters of cream to pale yellow, ageing to pale pink blooms appear.

== Taxonomy and naming ==
Hakea acuminata was first formally described in 1999 by Laurence Haegi in the Flora of Australia from specimens collected on the north slope of One Tree Hill, south of Ravensthorpe in 1979. The specific epithet (acuminata) means 'pointed', referring to the leaves.

== Distribution and habitat ==
This species is endemic to the area between Ravensthorpe and Jerramungup in the Esperance Plains bioregion, where it grows on undulating plains of shrub-mallee or heath in deep white sand or loamy soils over granite. The species has been only been discovered in recent years, and is only known from five localities.

== Conservation status ==
Hakea acuminata is classified as "Priority Two" by the Government of Western Australia Department of Biodiversity, Conservation and Attractions, meaning that it is poorly known and from one or a few locations.
