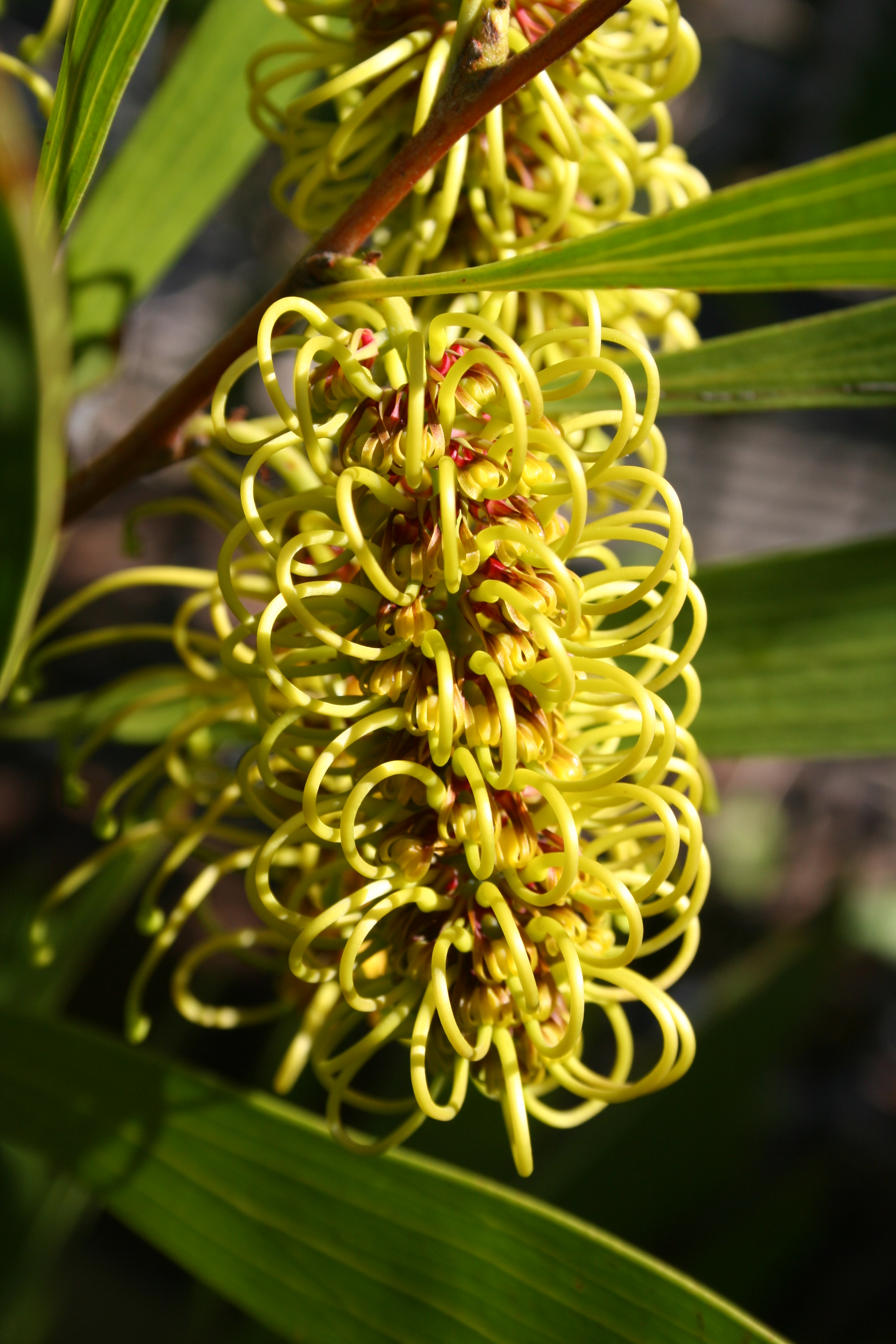

Conservation status
- Vulnerable (IUCN 3.1)

Scientific classification
- Kingdom: Plantae
- Clade: Tracheophytes
- Clade: Angiosperms
- Clade: Eudicots
- Order: Proteales
- Family: Proteaceae
- Genus: Hakea
- Species: H. trineura

Binomial name
- Hakea trineura (F.Muell.)F.Muell.

= Hakea trineura =

Species of shrub endemic to Queensland, Australia

Hakea trineura is a species of flowering plant in the family Proteaceae. It is endemic to Queensland, Australia. The branches and leaves are covered with rusty hairs and the pendulous flowers are greenish-yellow.

== Description ==
Hakea trineura is a multi-stemmed shrub growing to 1–3 m (3–10 ft) high and forms a lignotuber. The branchlets and new leaf growth have flattened, brown, short soft silky hairs, or are smooth. The leaves grow on a petiole about 1–2.5 cm (0.39–0.98 in) long. They are narrowly elliptic to egg-shaped 7–20 cm (3–8 in) long by 1.3–7 cm (0.5–3 in) wide with three distinct longitudinal veins. The leaves narrow gradually to the apex ending either with a sharp point or rounded. The inflorescence consists of 60–80 greenish-yellow flowers on a smooth or with sparsely flattened soft hairs on a rachis up to 40–70 mm (2–3 in) long. The mid-green pedicel 2.3–3 mm (0.09–0.1 in) long and smooth. The deep yellow perianths are 7–8.5 mm (0.3–0.3 in) long and are smooth or with a few hairs when in bud. The styles are mid-green and the pistil 18–26 mm (0.71–1.02 in) long. Flowering occurs from May to September and the fruit are smooth, obliquely egg-shaped 2–4 cm (0.8–2 in) long by 1.5–2 cm (0.6–0.8 in) wide and slightly curved.

== Taxonomy and naming ==
Hakea trineura was first formally described in 1868 by Ferdinand von Mueller who gave it the name Grevillea trineura and published the description in Fragmenta Phytographiae Australiae. In 1868, Mueller changed the name to Hakea trineura. It is said to be named from the Greek trineura, referring to the three-veined leaves. Trineura is however not attested in ancient Greek.

== Distribution and habitat ==
Hakea trineura is restricted to the Maryborough to Rockhampton area of Queensland. It grows in hilly eucalyptus woodland over hummock grasslands. It is a quick growing shrub in tropical areas.

== Conservation status ==
Hakea trineura is listed as "vulnerable" by the Australian Department of the Environment Protection and Biodiversity Conservation Act.
