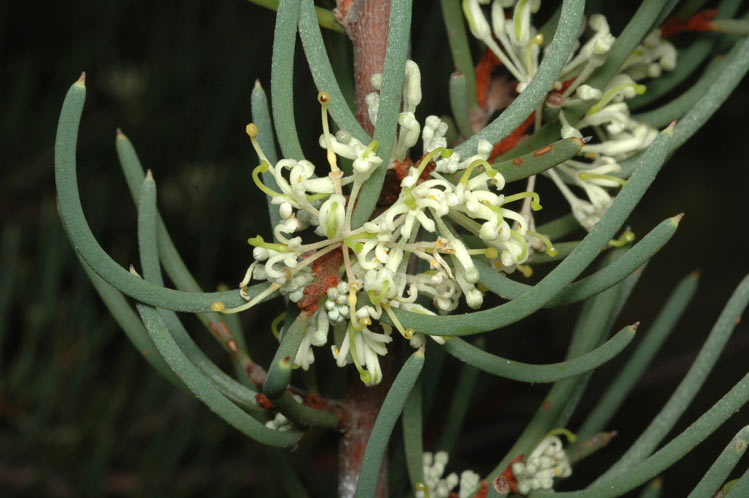

Scientific classification
- Kingdom: Plantae
- Clade: Tracheophytes
- Clade: Angiosperms
- Clade: Eudicots
- Order: Proteales
- Family: Proteaceae
- Genus: Hakea
- Species: H. megadenia

Binomial name
- Hakea megadenia R.M.Barker
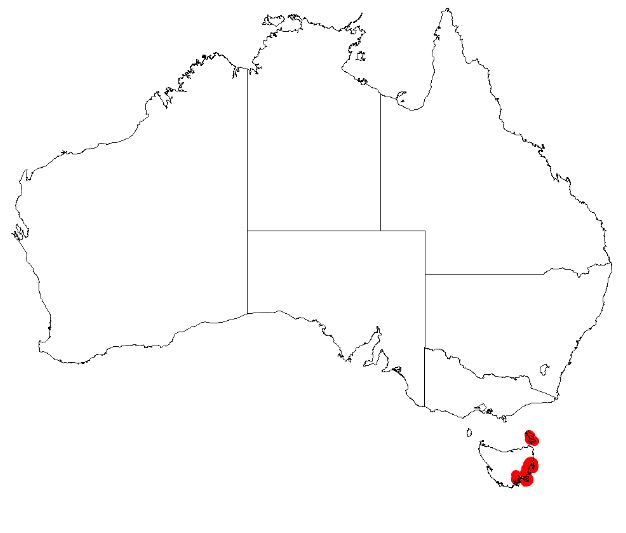
- Occurrence data from AVH

= Hakea megadenia =

Species of plant endemic to Tasmania and the Furneaux Island group

Hakea megadenia is a shrub or tree of the family Proteaceae endemic to an area along the east coast of Tasmania and the Furneaux Island group off the coast of Tasmania.

== Description ==
Hakea megadenia is an upright bushy spreading shrub or small tree 2–5 m (6 ft 7 in – 16 ft 5 in) high. The branchlets are covered densely in flattened hairs. The dull green leaves are needle-shaped or flattened 3–13 cm (1.2–5.1 in) long and 1–2 mm (0.039–0.079 in) wide ending in a sharp point. The inflorescence on female plants has 1–8 flowers and the male 3–14 flowers. The overlapping bracts 1.5–2 mm (0.059–0.079 in) long, the inflorescence stalk 1–3 mm (0.039–0.118 in) long hairy and rust coloured. The pedicel 2–5 mm (0.079–0.197 in) long with white flattened dense silky hairs extending to the whitish 3–5 mm (0.12–0.20 in) long perianth. The fruit are S-shaped, 1.8–2.5 cm (0.71–0.98 in) long and 0.9–1.2 cm (0.35–0.47 in) wide. The white to cream flowers appear in leaf axils from February to July.

== Taxonomy and naming ==
Hakea megadenia was first formally described in 1991 by R.M.Barker and published in Aspects of Tasmanian Botany - a tribute to Winifred Curtis. The specific epithet (megadenia) is derived from the Ancient Greek mega meaning "large" and aden, adenos meaning "gland", referring to the long gland in this species.

== Distribution and habitat ==
This species is found on the east coast of Tasmania and the Furneaux group of islands. Growing at lower altitudes in coastal areas, river bushland or drier forest. On the islands it grows at higher altitudes with longer leaves and perianth and larger fruit.
