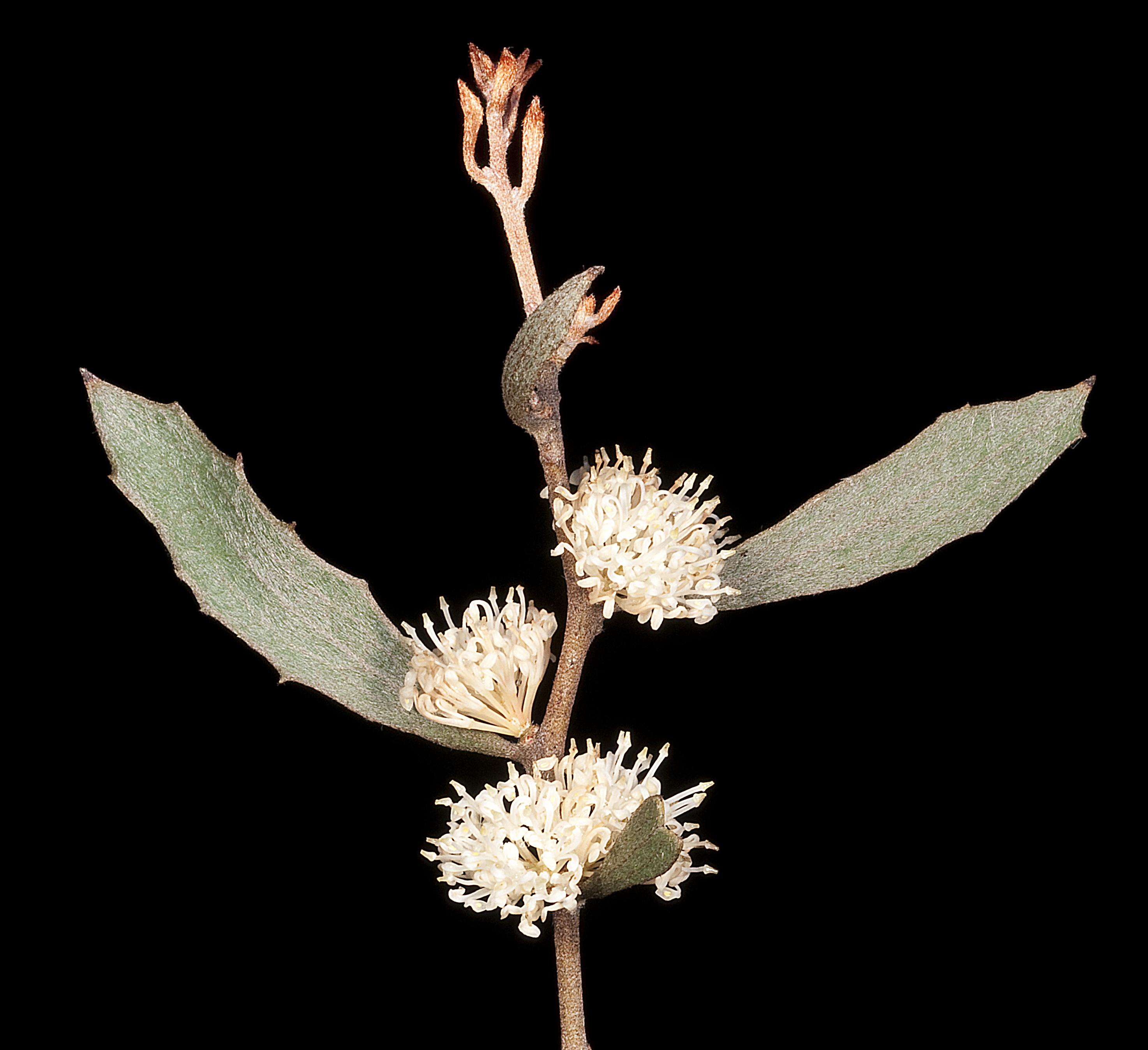

Scientific classification
- Kingdom: Plantae
- Clade: Tracheophytes
- Clade: Angiosperms
- Clade: Eudicots
- Order: Proteales
- Family: Proteaceae
- Genus: Hakea
- Species: H. anadenia

Binomial name
- Hakea anadenia Haegi
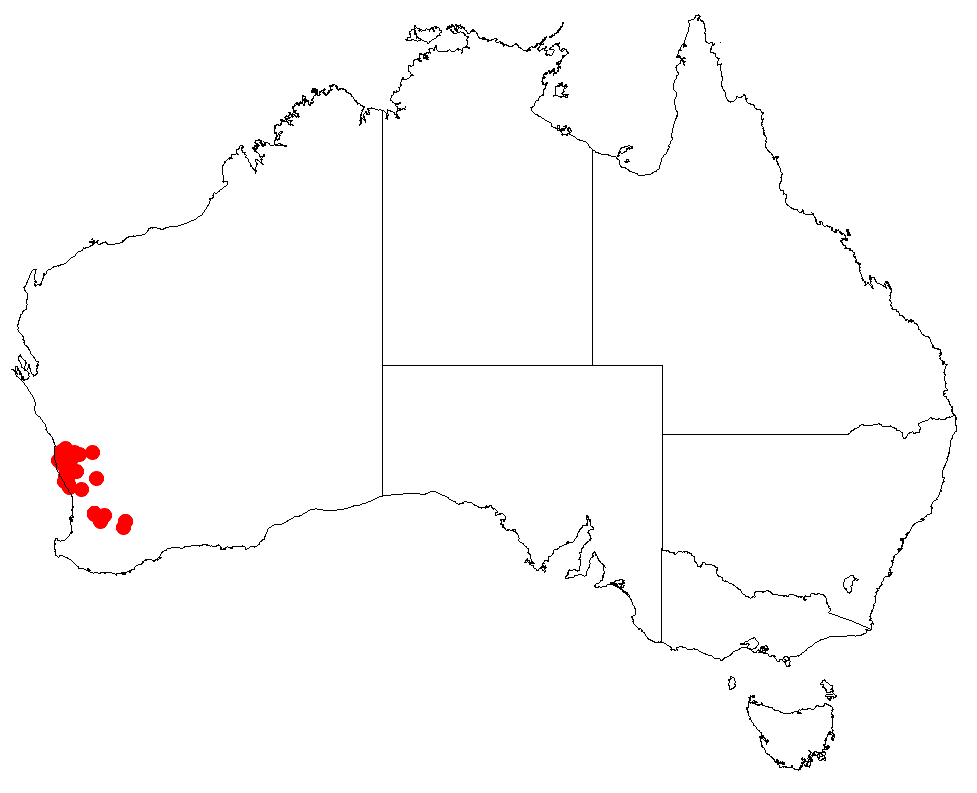
- Occurrence data from Australasian Virtual Herbarium

= Hakea anadenia =

Species of shrub native to Western Australia

Hakea anadenia is a shrub in the family Proteaceae, native to near the west coast of Western Australia. The fragrant creamy-white flowers appear in profusion from late winter to spring, but do not produce nectar.

== Description ==
Hakea anadenia is an upright lignotuberous bushy shrub 0.3 to 2 metres (1 to 7 ft) high and 1–2 m (3–7 ft) wide. Smaller branches are smooth with grey bark and have flattened soft colourless hairs at flowering. Leaves are narrowly oval to egg-shaped and shallowly concave with one to three prominent longitudinal veins. Leaves are 2.7 to 8.5 centimetres (1.1 to 3.3 in) long and 6 to 20 millimetres (0.236 to 0.787 in) wide, narrower at the base and sometimes wavy. Leaves are toothed with a sharp point. There are one or two inflorescence per axil with 14 to 20 flowers on each raceme. Flowers are devoid of a nectar-producing gland. The pedicels are smooth. The perianth are white or pink and the style 4–6 mm (0.2–0.2 in) long. Dense clusters of cream-white to pink fragrantly scented flowers appear from July to October. The woody fruit are at an erect angle on the stalk, narrowly egg-shaped 17 to 23 mm (0.67 to 0.91 in) long and 8 to 11 mm (0.31 to 0.43 in) wide usually with a beak. The black egg-shaped seed are 12 to 15 mm (0.47 to 0.59 in) long with wings down both sides.

== Taxonomy and naming ==
Hakea anadenia was first formally described by Robyn Barker, L.Haegi, W.Barker and A.Wilson in 1999 and published in Flora of Australia.

== Distribution and habitat ==
Hakea anadenia has a scattered distribution and is endemic to an area in the Wheatbelt region of Western Australia from around Dandaragan in the north to Williams in the south. Grows in sandy or gravelly soils over or around laterite usually in scrub-heath communities, also in mallee or low woodland areas.

== Uses in horticulture ==
A showy small shrub both drought and frost tolerant. Grows well in an open and sunny situation in well-drained soil. Although it does not produce nectar as a food source for wildlife it does provide good protection due to its prickly growth habit.

== Conservation status ==
Hakea anadenia is classified as "not threatened" by the Western Australian Government Department of Parks and Wildlife.
