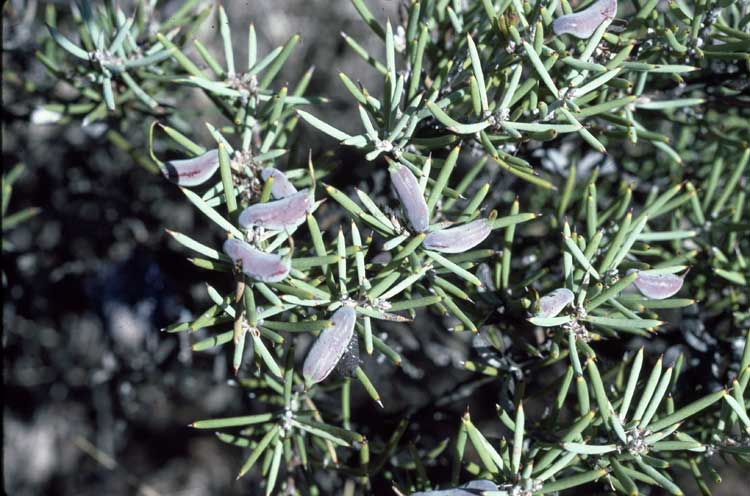

Scientific classification
- Kingdom: Plantae
- Clade: Tracheophytes
- Clade: Angiosperms
- Clade: Eudicots
- Order: Proteales
- Family: Proteaceae
- Genus: Hakea
- Species: H. collina

Binomial name
- Hakea collina C.T.White
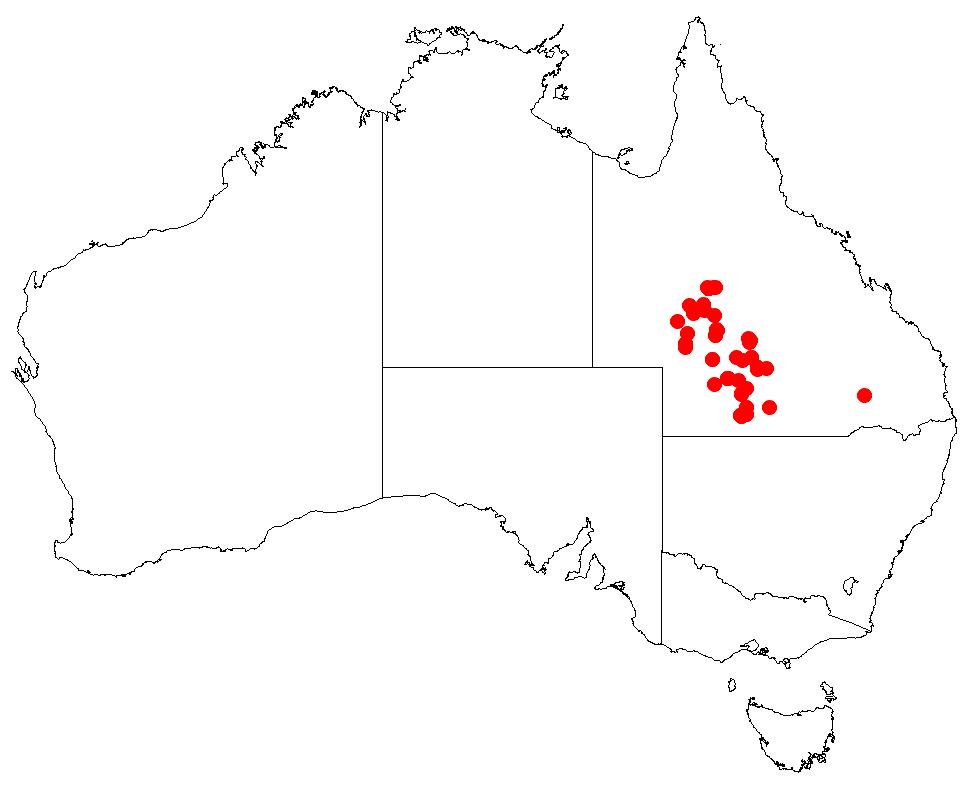
- Occurrence data from Australasian Virtual Herbarium

= Hakea collina =

Species of shrub native to eastern Australia

Hakea collina is a shrub in the family Proteaceae native to eastern Australia. A small many branched shrub with gnarled branches with attractive cream-yellowish flowers.

== Description ==
Hakea collina is an intricately branched often gnarled shrub growing to 1 to 2.6 metres (3.3 to 8.5 ft) high. Smaller branches and leaves have fine flattened silky hairs that remain until flowering. Straight needle-like leaves are crowded at the branch ends 1.5 to 3.5 cm (0.6 to 1 in) long and 1.2 to 1.7 millimetres (0.0 to 0.1 in) wide, sometimes grooved on the lower side. The inflorescence has two to twelve flowers with a white perianth 2.7 to 4.5 millimetres (0.106 to 0.177 in) long and the style is about 9 mm (0.4 in) long. The pedicel is 2.5–5 mm (0.1–0.2 in) long and covered with soft white hairs extending onto the lower part of the flower. The egg-shaped fruit are finely wrinkled, narrower at the stem 14 to 18 mm (0.551 to 0.709 in) long and 6.5 to 8.5 mm (0.256 to 0.335 in) wide. Fruit taper to a short pointed tip 2–4 mm (0.08–0.2 in) long with no beak. The seeds are 11 to 14 mm (0.433 to 0.551 in) long with a wing that is on one side. Flowers in the colder months from May to July.

== Taxonomy ==
Hakea collina was first formally described by the botanist Cyril Tenison White in 1944 as part of the work Contributions to the Queensland Flora as published in the Proceedings of the Royal Society of Queensland. The specific epithet (collina) is derived from the Latin word collinus meaning "of a hill" or "hilly", referring to the habitat where the shrub occurs.

== Distribution ==
It is endemic to an area in the south west of Queensland on lateritic tableland on hills and plains as a part of open Acacia woodland and shrubland communities.

== Conservation status ==
Hakea collina was classified as 'Poorly Known' in J.D.Briggs & J.H.Leigh, "Rare or Threatened Australian Plants" (1995).
