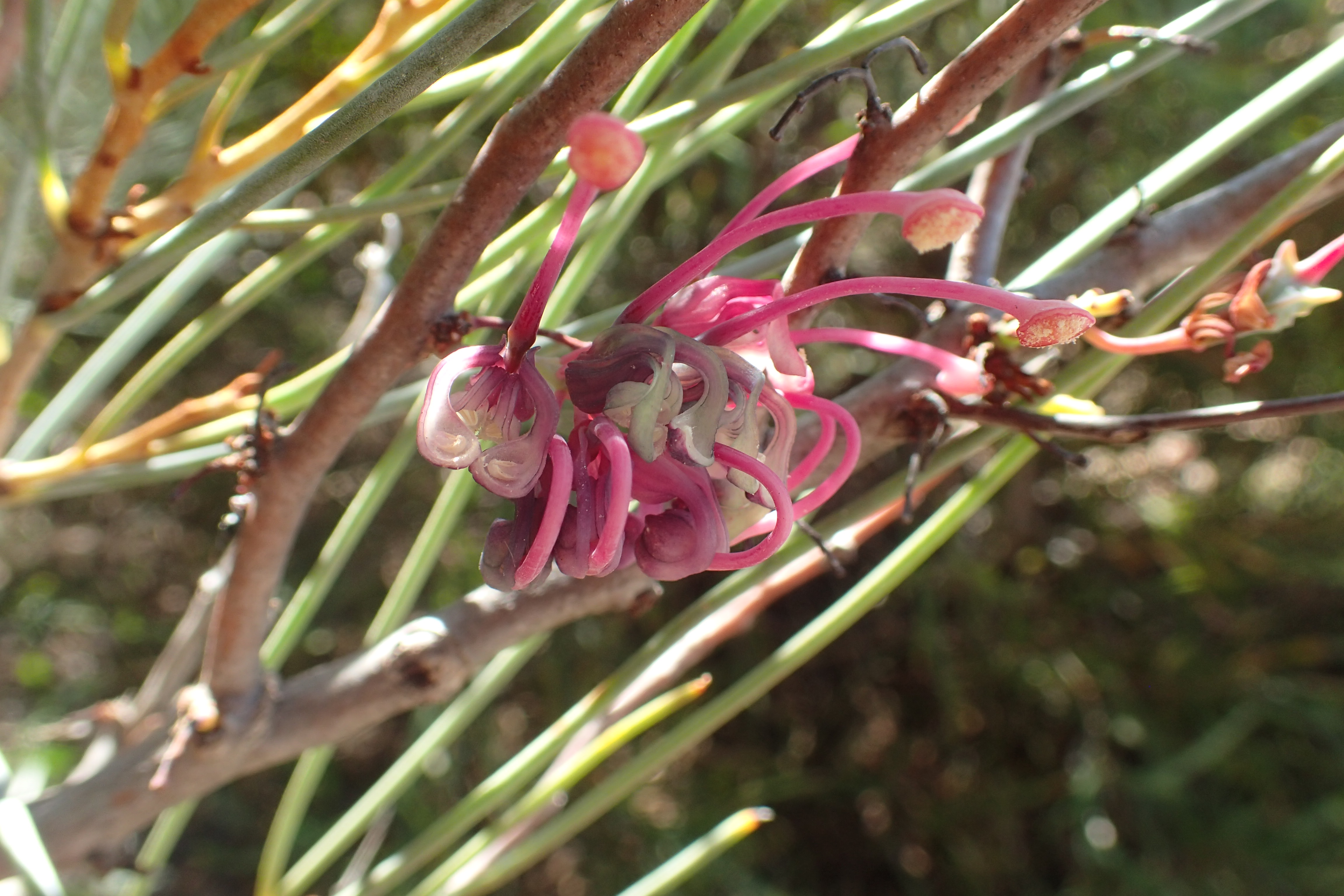
- Hakea rhombales in Kings Park

Scientific classification
- Kingdom: Plantae
- Clade: Tracheophytes
- Clade: Angiosperms
- Clade: Eudicots
- Order: Proteales
- Family: Proteaceae
- Genus: Hakea
- Species: H. rhombales

Binomial name
- Hakea rhombales F.Muell.
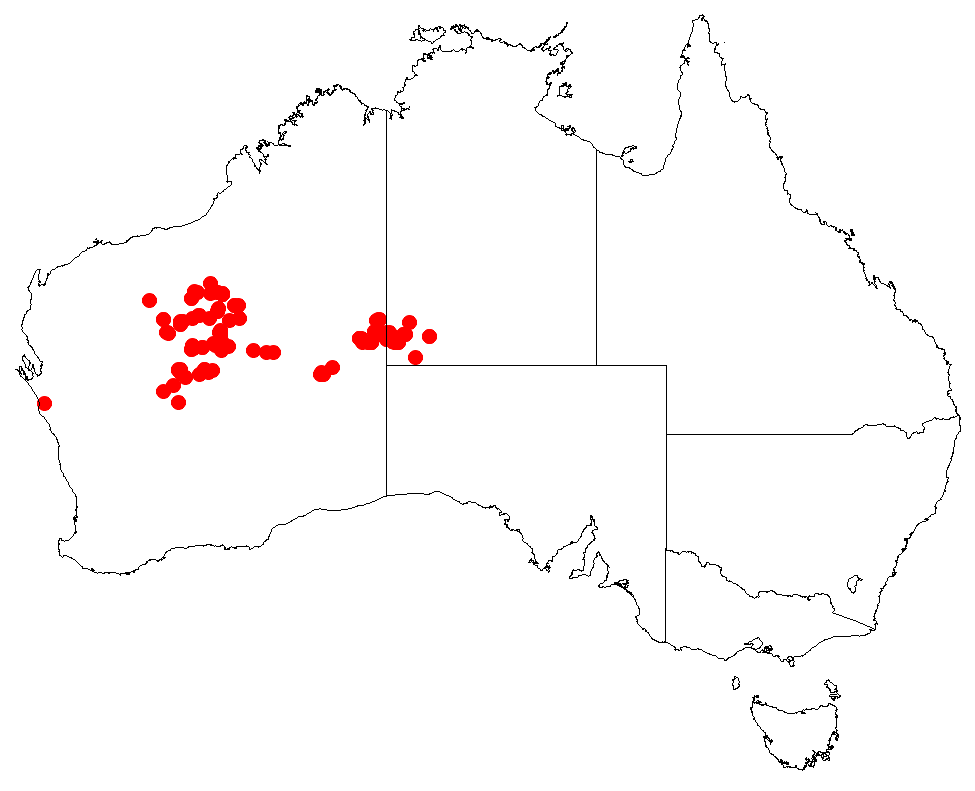
- Occurrence data from Australasian Virtual Herbarium

= Hakea rhombales =

Species of shrub endemic to Australia

Hakea rhombales, commonly known as walukara, is a shrub in the family Proteaceae. It has red, pink or purple flowers and is endemic to Western Australia and the Northern Territory.

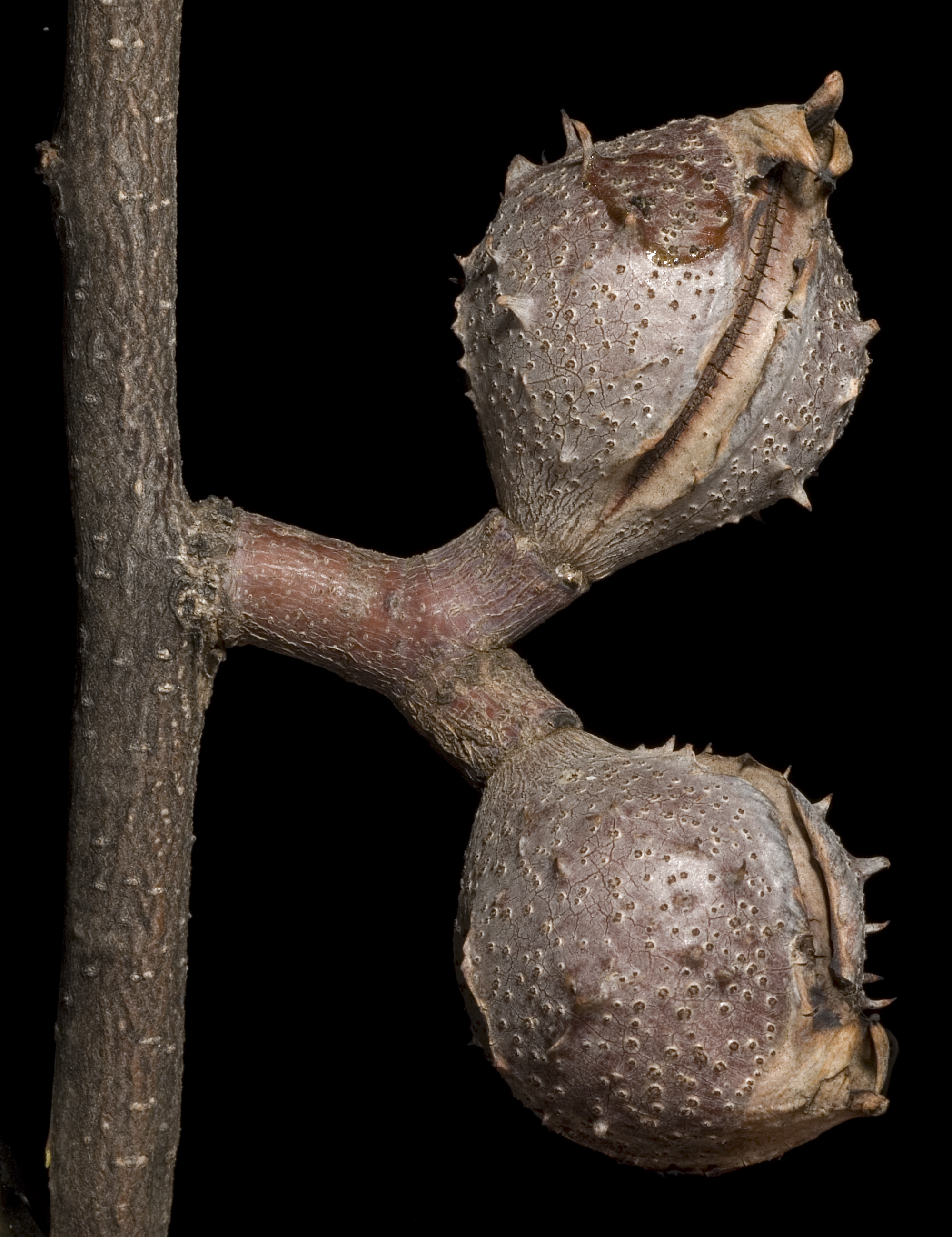
Fruit

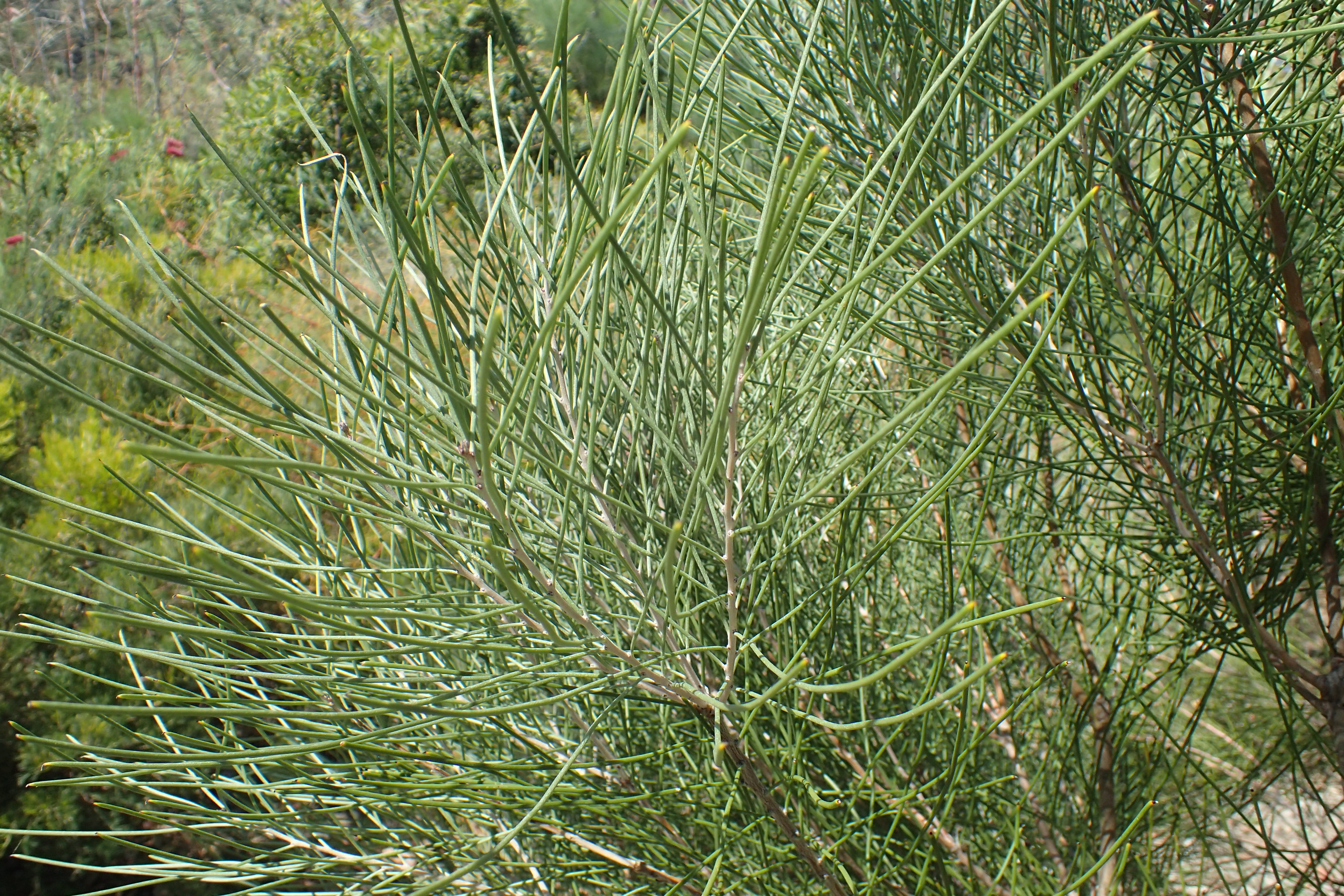
Foliage

== Description ==
The bushy shrub typically grows to a height of 1.5 to 3 metres (5 to 10 ft) and is usually just as wide. It blooms from April to September and produces red-pink-purple flowers.

The branchlets and young leaves are appressed-pubescent with ferruginous hairs but otherwise glabrescent. The simple leaves are 6.5 to 23 centimetres (3 to 9 in) long and 1.6 to 1.9 mm (0.06 to 0.07 in) wide.

Inflorescence are erect and sometimes from old wood, they contain 10–16 flowers with simple rachis that are 7 to 11 mm (0.28 to 0.43 in) long. The inflorescence is glabrous or appressed-pubescent with pedicels approximately 6 mm (0.24 in) long.

The fruit are formed in an obliquely obovate shape, 2.2 to 3.5 cm (0.9 to 1.4 in) long and 1.6 to 2.3 cm (0.6 to 0.9 in) wide. The fruit are black-pusticulate with a toothed crest found on either side of suture.

== Taxonomy and naming ==
Hakea rhombales was first formally described by the botanist Ferdinand von Mueller in 1876 in Fragmenta Phytographiae Australiae. The name of the species is from the Latin word rhombus referring to the shape of the wing on the seed.

== Distribution and habitat ==
Walukara has a scattered distribution through area in the Pilbara and the Goldfields regions of Western Australia where it is found on sand dunes, plains and hillsides growing in sandy or loamy soils. Its range extends east into the Northern Territory to around the Petermann Range.

== Conservation status ==
Hakea rhombales is classified as "not threatened" by the Western Australian Government Department of Parks and Wildlife.
