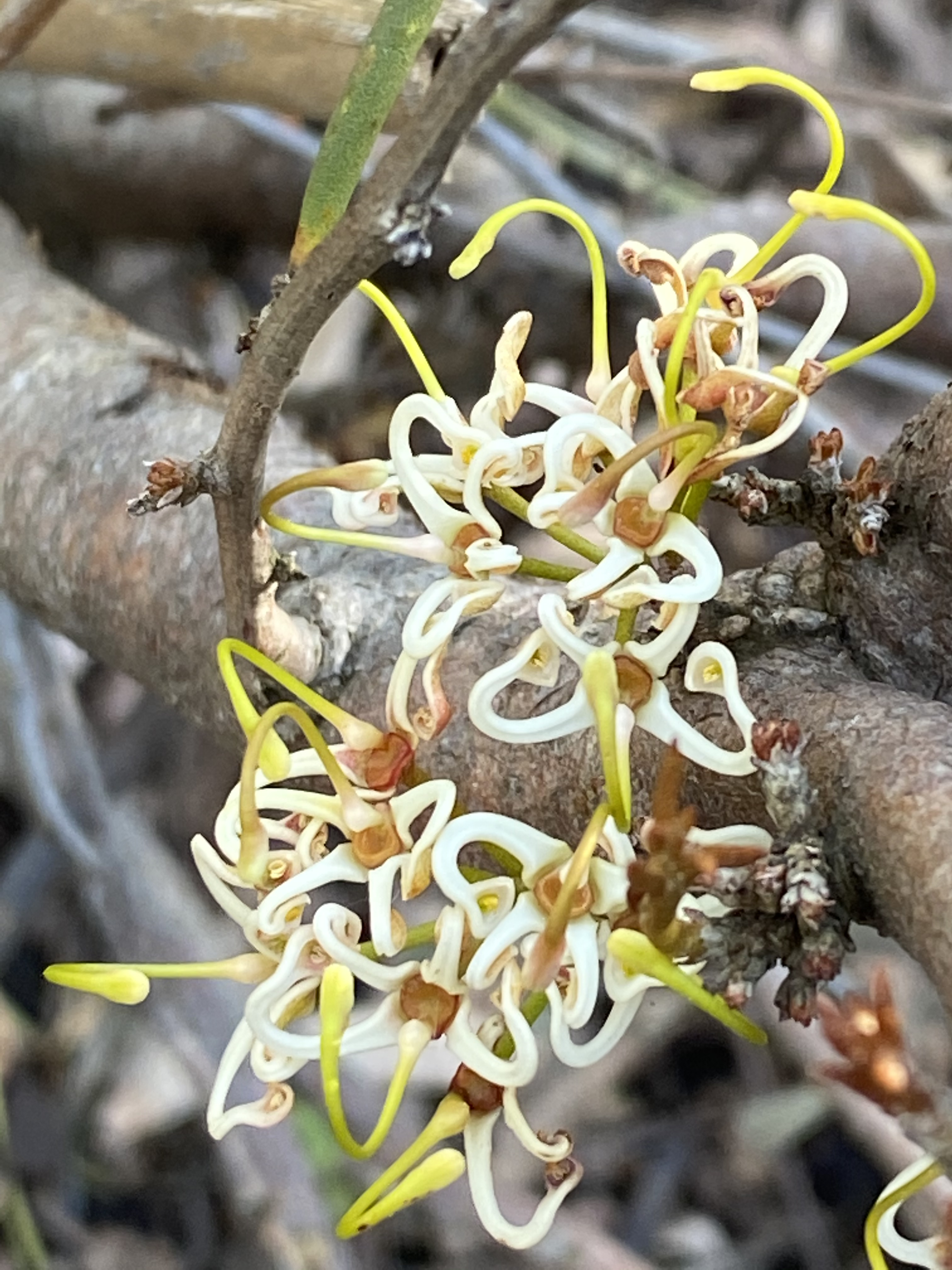
- In the ANBG

Scientific classification
- Kingdom: Plantae
- Clade: Tracheophytes
- Clade: Angiosperms
- Clade: Eudicots
- Order: Proteales
- Family: Proteaceae
- Genus: Hakea
- Species: H. platysperma

Binomial name
- Hakea platysperma Hook.f.
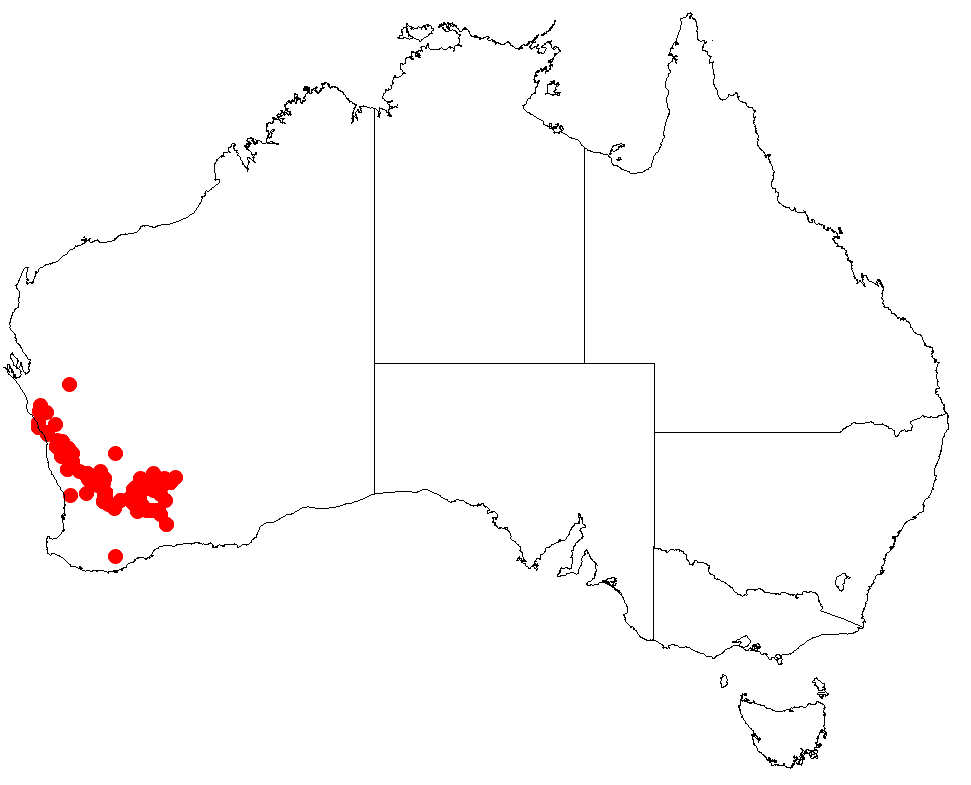
- Occurrence data from Australasian Virtual Herbarium

= Hakea platysperma =

Cricket ball hakea

Species of shrub native to Western Australia

Hakea platysperma, commonly known as the cricket ball hakea, is a shrub in the family Proteaceae. It has long, sharply pointed, needle-shaped leaves and fragrant cream-reddish flowers in clusters from July to October. It is endemic to the south west of Western Australia.

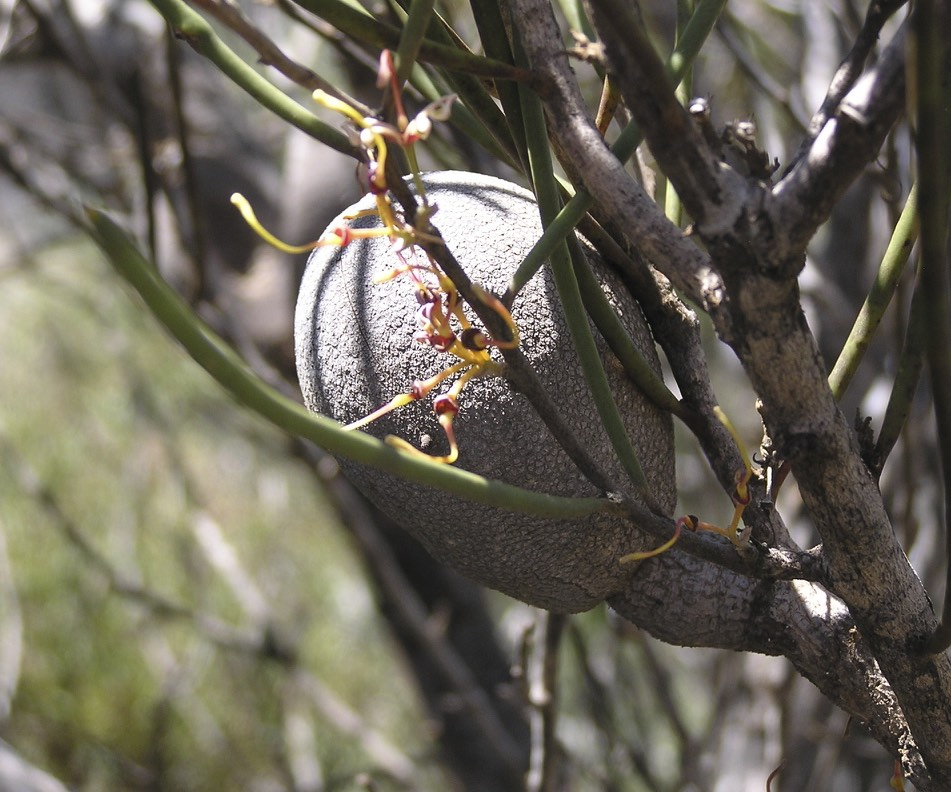
Fruit of H. platysperma

== Description ==
Hakea platysperma is a single stemmed, spreading shrub to 1–2 m (3 ft 3 in – 6 ft 7 in) tall and a similar width. The branchlets and young leaves are covered with rusty coloured, flattened, smooth hairs. The thick, rigid leaves are needle-shaped, 3–15.5 cm (1.2–6.1 in) long, 1.4–3 mm (0.055–0.118 in) wide, yellowish at the base and ending with a sharp point 1–4.5 mm (0.039–0.177 in) long. Sweetly scented creamy reddish to yellow flowers appear in profusion in axillary racemes. Flowering occurs from July to October and the fruit are globose, cricket ball shaped and 4.5–7.5 cm (2–3 in) long by up to 6.5 cm (3 in) in diameter, with a smooth surface.

== Taxonomy and naming ==
Cricket ball hakea was first formally described in 1842 by Joseph Dalton Hooker and the description was published in his book Icones Plantarum. The specific epithet (platysperma) is derived from the Ancient Greek platy 'wide', and sperma 'seed', referring to the large, circular fruit.

== Distribution and habitat ==
Hakea platysperma grows in sand, sandy clay and occasionally over laterite in the Avon Wheatbelt, Coolgardie, Geraldton Sandplains and Mallee biogeographic regions of Western Australia.

== Conservation status ==
Hakea platysperma is classified as "not threatened" by the Western Australian Government.

== Cultivation ==
The main horticultural appeal of this species is the giant woody seed pods, which have been used in cut flower arrangements. H. platysperma can be grown in a sunny position in well-drained soil.
