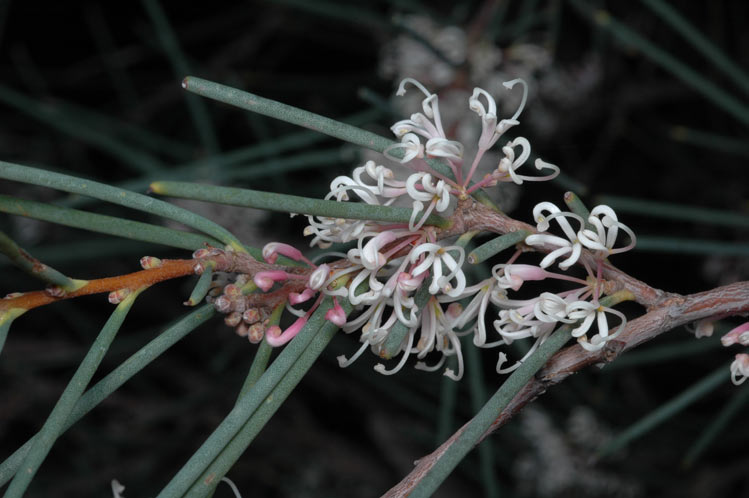

Scientific classification
- Kingdom: Plantae
- Clade: Tracheophytes
- Clade: Angiosperms
- Clade: Eudicots
- Order: Proteales
- Family: Proteaceae
- Genus: Hakea
- Species: H. cycloptera

Binomial name
- Hakea cycloptera R.Br.
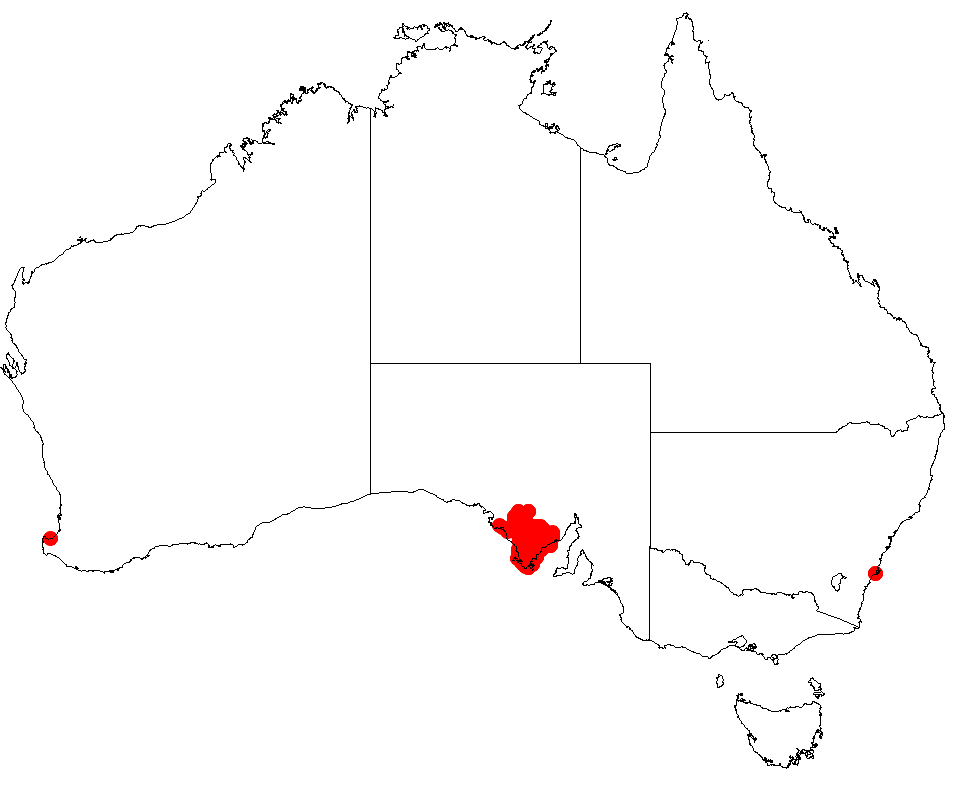
- Occurrence data from Australasian Virtual Herbarium

= Hakea cycloptera =

Elm-seed Hakea

Species of shrub endemic to South Australia

Hakea cycloptera, commonly known as elm-seed hakea, is a shrub in the family Proteaceae endemic to South Australia. It is a small spreading shrub with an abundance of pale pink or white flowers from December to August.

== Description ==
Hakea cycloptera is a straggly bush or shrub 0.3–1.3 m (1–4 ft) tall. Smaller branches and young leaves are white and smooth. Needle-shaped leaves are covered with soft silky hairs or are smooth, usually 5–15 cm (2.0–5.9 in) long and 1.1–1.9 mm (0.043–0.075 in) wide ending in a sharp point 1–2.8 mm (0.039–0.11 in) long. The inflorescence consists of 1–14 white or pale pink flowers and appear in axillary racemes. The flower stem is 0.5–3 mm (0.020–0.12 in) long with flattened white hairs. The smooth pedicels are 2.5–6 mm (0.098–0.24 in) long. The perianth is either pink or white and 4–6.5 mm (0.16–0.26 in) long, smooth, bluish-green with a powdery film. The style 7–12 mm (0.28–0.47 in) long. The warty or wrinkled fruit are broadly elliptic to circular 2.5–4 cm (1–2 in) long and 2–3.4 cm (0.8–1 in) wide ending in a coarse short oblique beak.

== Taxonomy and naming ==
Hakea cycloptera was named by botanist Robert Brown in 1810 and published in Transactions of the Linnean Society of London. The specific epithet (cycloptera) is derived from the Ancient Greek words kyklos meaning "circle" and pteron for "wing", referring to the shape of the seed wing.

== Distribution and habitat ==
Confined to the Eyre Peninsula in South Australia. Grows in sandy soil in mallee scrub and withstands moderate frosts. A useful, dense shrub for dry conditions and wildlife habitat.
