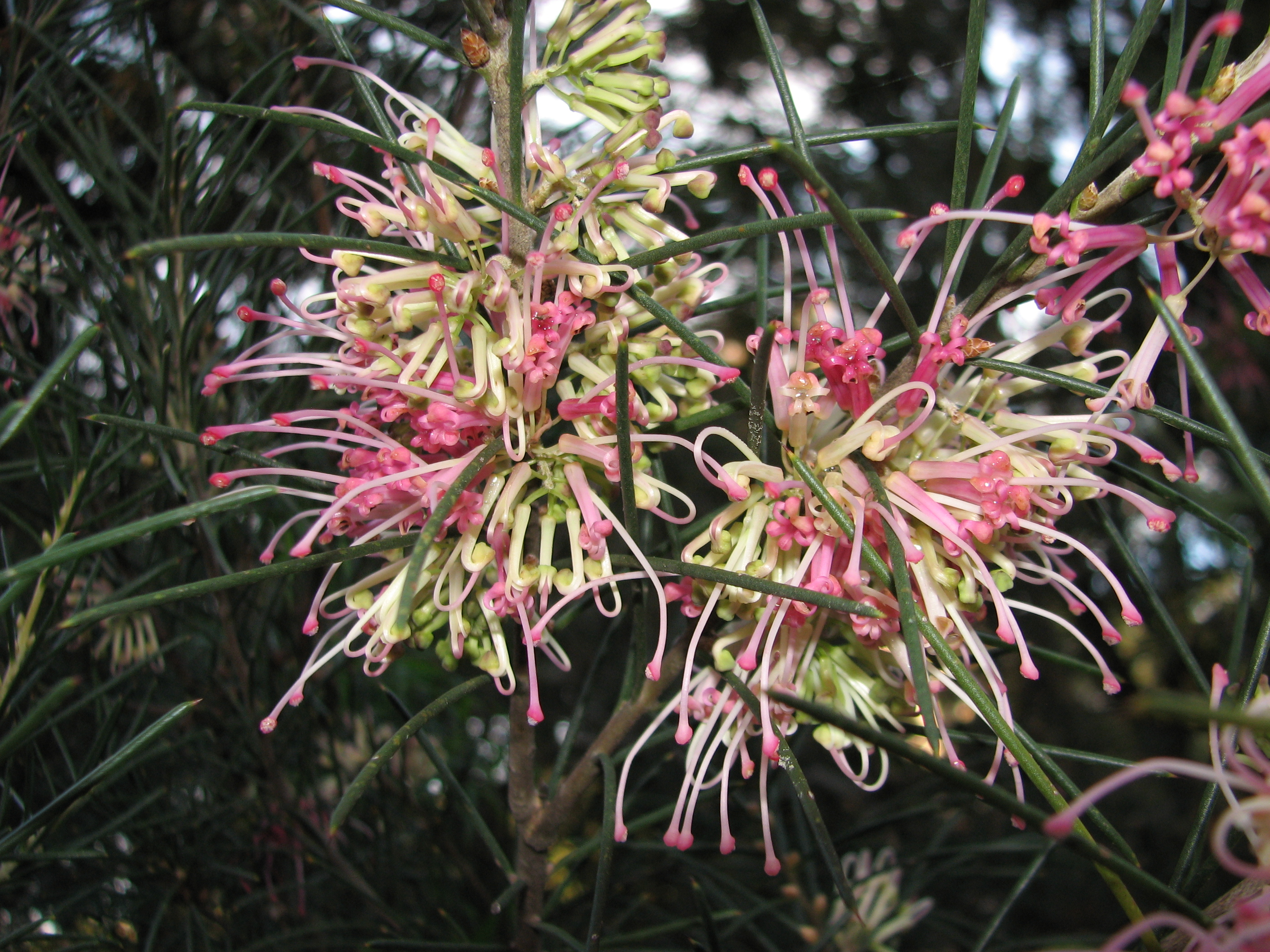

Scientific classification
- Kingdom: Plantae
- Clade: Tracheophytes
- Clade: Angiosperms
- Clade: Eudicots
- Order: Proteales
- Family: Proteaceae
- Genus: Hakea
- Species: H. verrucosa

Binomial name
- Hakea verrucosa F.Muell.

= Hakea verrucosa =

Species of shrub endemic to Western Australia

Hakea verrucosa is a flowering plant in the family Proteaceae that is endemic to south-west Western Australia. It has large white, deep pink or red pendulous flowers with stiff needle-shaped leaves.

== Description ==
Hakea verrucosa is a spreading prickly shrub growing to 0.8–2.6 m (3–9 ft) high and does not form a lignotuber. The branchlets are covered mostly in densely matted, short, rusty hairs. The green terete leaves are about 2–6.3 cm (0.79–2.48 in) long and 1–1.5 mm (0.039–0.059 in) wide, ending in a sharp point 1–2 mm (0.039–0.079 in) long. The leaves are smooth and have a tendency to point in one direction from the branchlet. The pendant inflorescence consists of 7–14 white, pink to red flowers in a showy profusion in axillary clusters, or on old wood. Each inflorescence is held on a stalk about 3–16 mm (0.12–0.63 in) long. The pedicel 2–5.4 mm (0.079–0.213 in) long, the perianth 6–9 mm (0.24–0.35 in) long, initially a cream-white and aging to pink and the pistil 21–25 mm (0.83–0.98 in) long. Flowering occurs between May and August and the fruit are obliquely egg-shaped 2.2–3.1 cm (0.9–1 in) long and 1.2–1.4 cm (0.5–0.6 in) wide with blister-like protuberances, tapering to two horns 2.5–5 mm (0.098–0.197 in) long.

== Taxonomy and naming ==
The species was first formally described in 1865 by Victorian Government Botanist Ferdinand von Mueller and published in the fifth volume of his Fragmenta Phytographiae Australiae. Named from the Latin verrucosus 'warty', referring to the seed surface.

== Distribution and habitat ==
Hakea verrucosa grows in heath and low woodland on sandy-loam, near creeks, clay and gravel ranging from Jerramungup along the coast to Esperance.

== Uses in horticulture ==
A frost-tolerant species that requires a well-drained site. Due to its dense prickly growth habit a good wildlife habitat and low windbreak.

== Conservation status ==
Hakea verrucosa is classified as "not threatened" by the Western Australian Government. Department of Parks and Wildlife.
