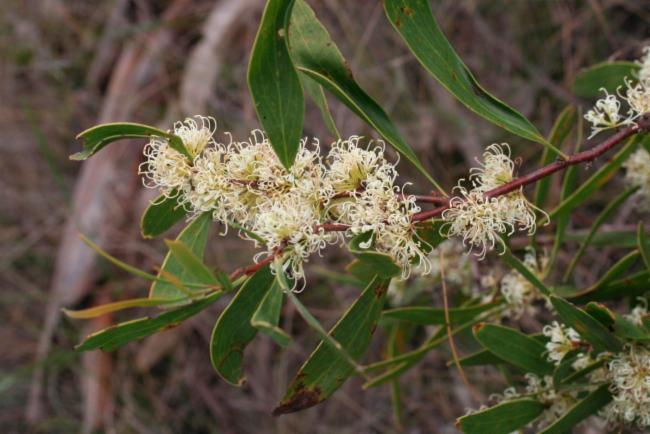
- Hakea florulenta near Grafton

Scientific classification
- Kingdom: Plantae
- Clade: Embryophytes
- Clade: Tracheophytes
- Clade: Spermatophytes
- Clade: Angiosperms
- Clade: Eudicots
- Order: Proteales
- Family: Proteaceae
- Genus: Hakea
- Species: H. florulenta

Binomial name
- Hakea florulenta Meisn.
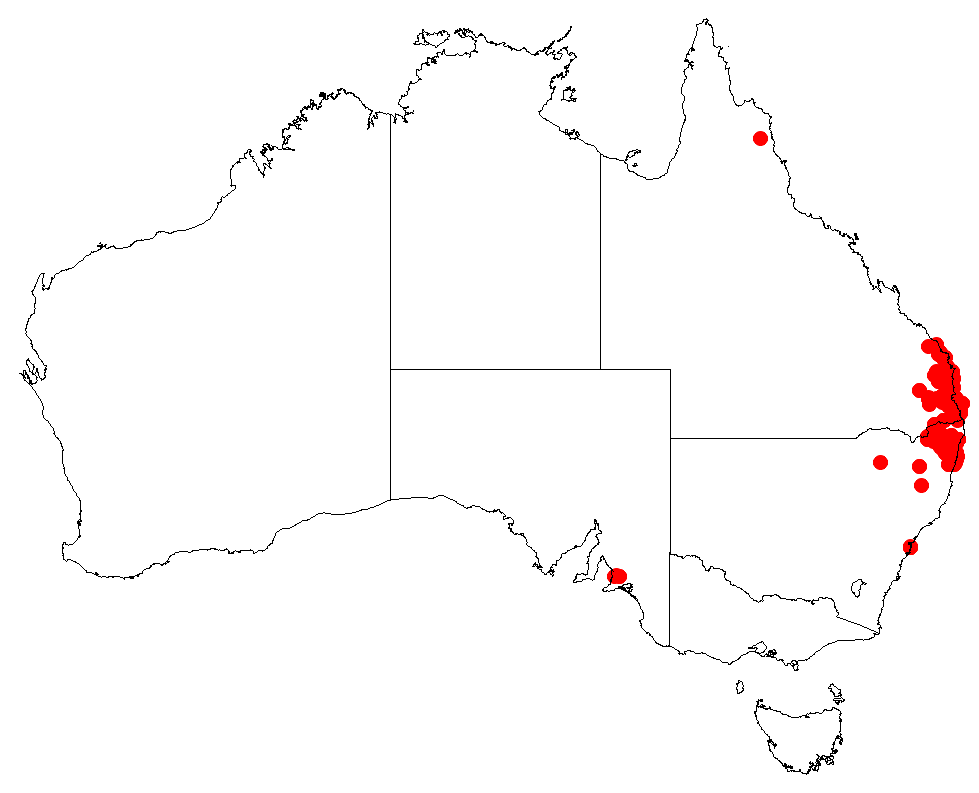
- Occurrence data from AVH

= Hakea florulenta =

Species of shrub endemic to eastern Australia

Hakea florulenta, commonly known as three-nerved willow hakea, is a woody shrub in the family Proteaceae and is endemic to eastern Australia.

== Description ==
Hakea florulenta is an erect shrub or small tree that typically grows to a height of 1.5–2 m (4 ft 11 in – 6 ft 7 in), sometimes has silky-hairy young shoot, and forms a lignotuber. The leaves are narrowly elliptic to lance-shaped, sometimes with the narrower end towards the base, 50–150 mm (2.0–5.9 in) long, and 10–35 mm (0.39–1.38 in) wide on a petiole 2–5 mm (0.079–0.197 in) long. The flowers are arranged in umbels in up to four leaf axils per branch, each umbel with 14 to 20 flowers on peduncles 3–4 mm (0.12–0.16 in) long, each flower on a pedicel 4.0–7.5 mm (0.16–0.30 in) long. The flowers are white, glabrous and 5–8 mm (0.20–0.31 in) long, the pistil 7–10 mm (0.28–0.39 in) long. Flowering occurs from September to December, and the fruit is obliquely elliptic 20–25 mm (0.79–0.98 in) long and 6–12 mm (0.24–0.47 in) wide, the surface with blackish blister-like protuberances.

== Taxonomy ==
Hakea florulenta was first formally described in 1855 by Carl Meissner from a specimen collected near Moreton Bay in Queensland by Frederick Strange (1826 - 1854), who was killed by Aborigines whilst collecting near Mackay. The description was published in Hooker's Journal of Botany and Kew Garden Miscellany. The specific epithet (florulenta) is a Latin word meaning "abounding in flowers" or "flowering profusely".

== Distribution and habitat ==
Hakea florulenta occurs in coastal areas of south-eastern Queensland and northern New South Wales from Bundaberg south to Grafton. Found growing in open forest, often associated with Melaleuca on sand or sandstone sometimes in poorly drained areas.
