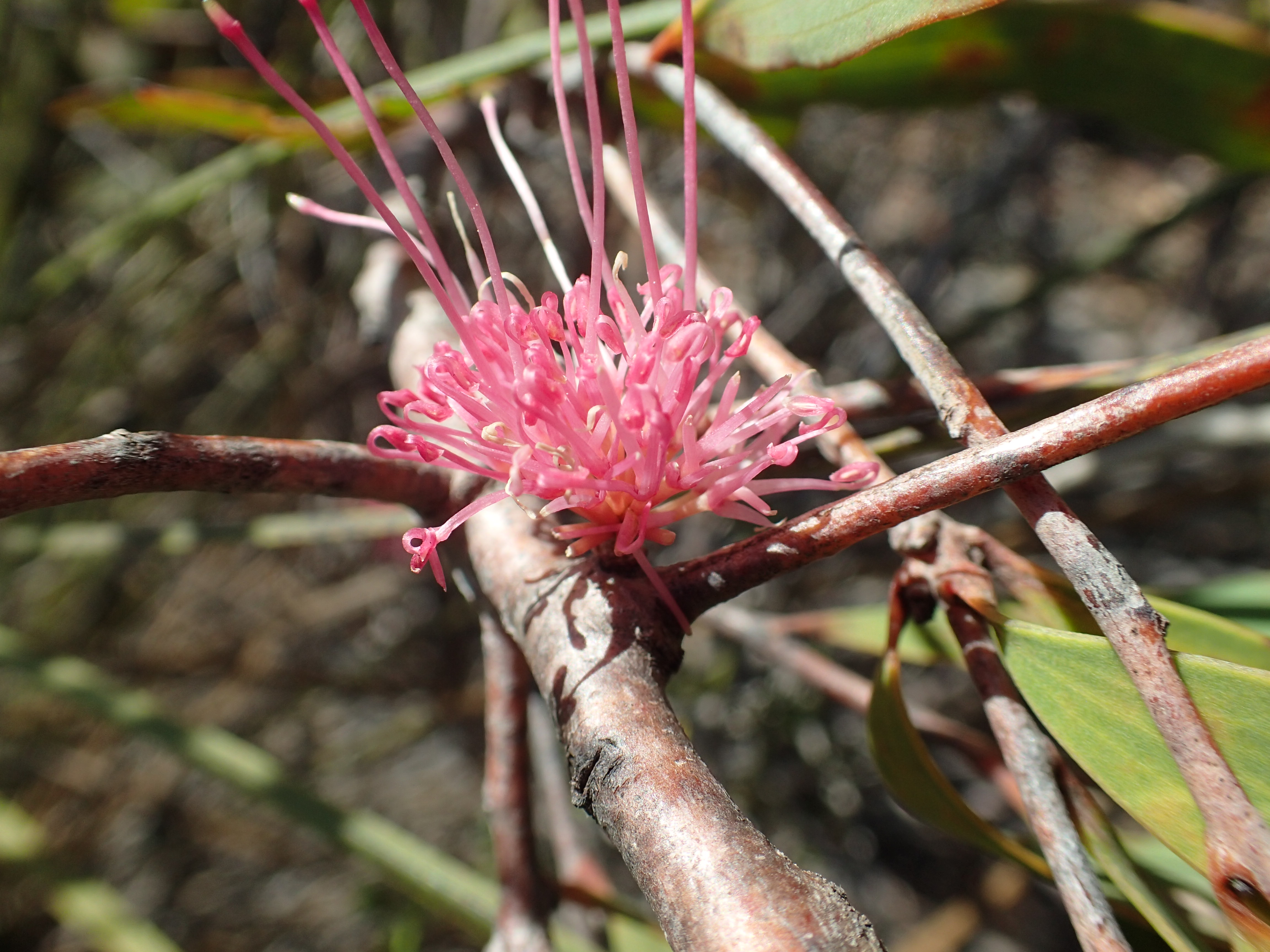
- Hakea obtusa in the Fitzgerald River National Park

Scientific classification
- Kingdom: Plantae
- Clade: Tracheophytes
- Clade: Angiosperms
- Clade: Eudicots
- Order: Proteales
- Family: Proteaceae
- Genus: Hakea
- Species: H. obtusa

Binomial name
- Hakea obtusa Meisn.
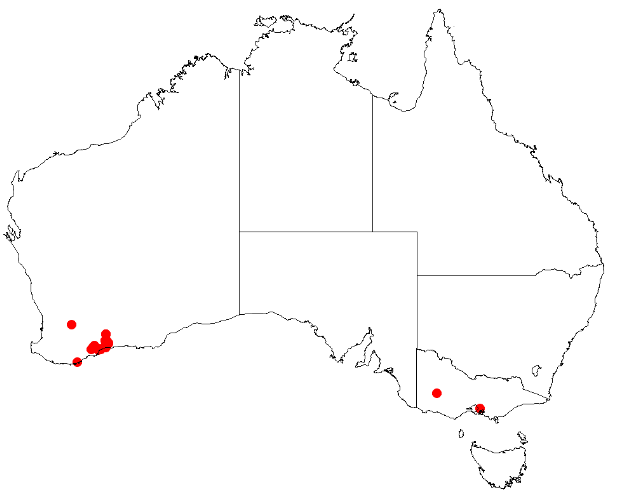
- Occurrence data from AVH

= Hakea obtusa =

Species of shrub endemic to Western Australia

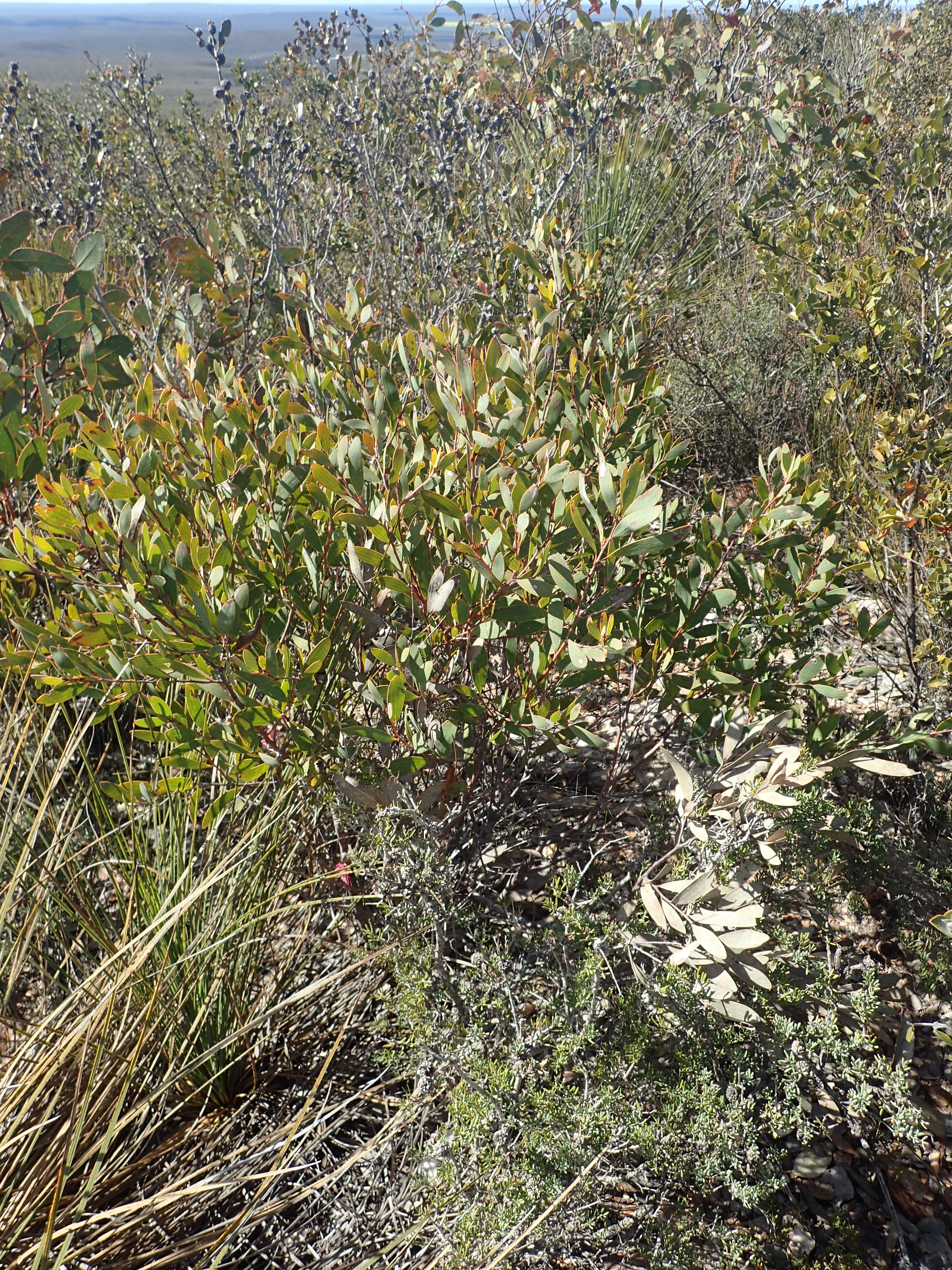
Habit

Hakea obtusa is a shrub in the family Proteaceae. It is endemic to an area along the south coast in the Goldfields-Esperance regions of Western Australia. It has white and pink fragrant flowers in autumn and spring.

== Description ==
Hakea obtusa is an open, rounded, stiff shrub typically growing to a height of 1.5 to 3 metres (4.9 to 9.8 ft) and does not form a lignotuber. It blooms profusely from May to September and produces sweetly scented white and pink flowers with long creamy white styles which appear at the nodes on bare wood. The leaves are oblong-elliptic 3–10 cm (1–4 in) long by 1–2 cm (0.4–0.8 in) wide with 3 distinctive longitudinal veins ending in a blunt point. The fruit are rough ovoid ending in a short sharp beak.

== Taxonomy and naming ==
The species was first formally described by Carl Meisner in 1856. Named from the Latin obtusus 'blunt', referring to the shape of the leaf.

== Distribution and habitat ==
Hakea obtusa is confined to Ravensthorpe and the Fitzgerald River National Park. Grows in shrubland and low woodland on loamy-clay, gravel and ironstone. A frost tolerant species that requires good drainage and a sunny aspect.

== Conservation status ==
Hakea obtusa is classified "not threatened" by the Western Australian Government.
