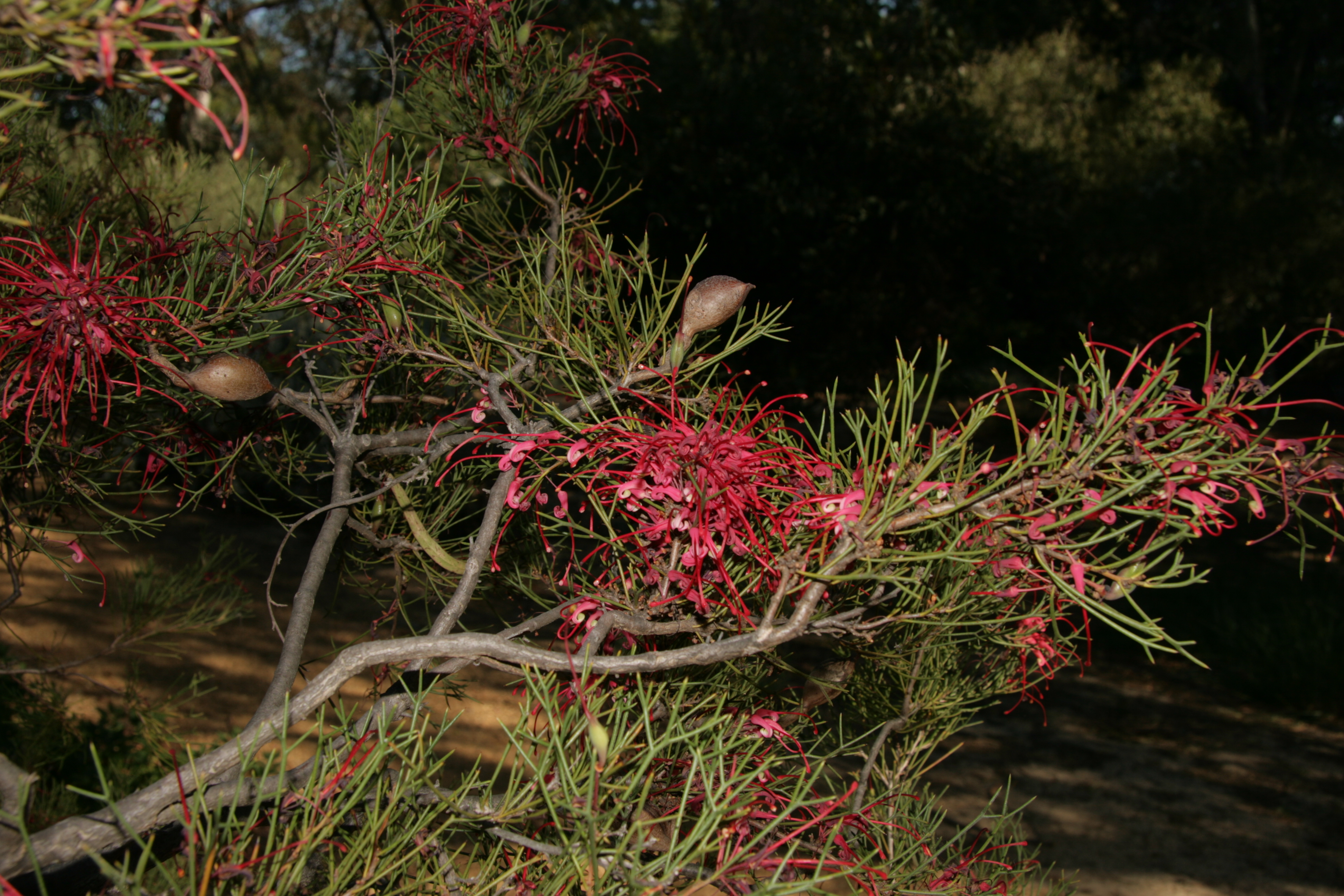

Scientific classification
- Kingdom: Plantae
- Clade: Tracheophytes
- Clade: Angiosperms
- Clade: Eudicots
- Order: Proteales
- Family: Proteaceae
- Genus: Hakea
- Species: H. purpurea

Binomial name
- Hakea purpurea Hook.
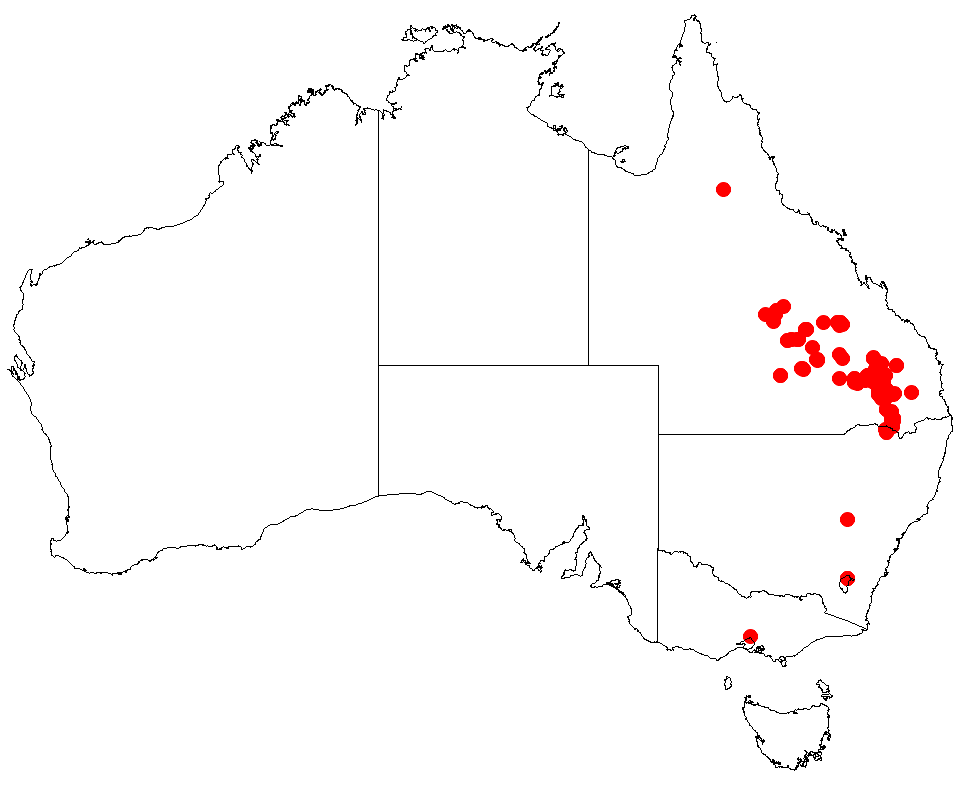
- Occurrence data from Australasian Virtual Herbarium

= Hakea purpurea =

Species of shrub native to Australia

Hakea purpurea is a species of flowering plant in the family Proteaceae. It grows in Queensland and New South Wales, Australia. It is a small shrub with needle-shaped leaves and clusters of red flowers in late winter to early spring.

== Description ==
Hakea purpurea is a dense, upright, slightly spreading shrub 0.3–3 m (1–10 ft) high and 1 m (3 ft) wide. The branchlets are either smooth or with flattened, silky hairs. The leaves are needle-shaped and divide toward the apex into 2–7 segments that are 1.6–9.5 cm (0.63–3.74 in) long and 0.8–1.5 mm (0.031–0.059 in) wide and end in a sharp point 1–2 mm (0.039–0.079 in) long. The leaves are thickly covered in short, matted, white or rusty coloured hairs quickly becoming smooth. Profuse reddish-purple flowers up to 3 cm (1 in) long appear in spring in thick clusters in the leaf axils, sometimes on old wood. These are followed by smoothish ovoid woody seed capsules that are approximately 1.5 cm (0.6 in) wide ending with an upturned beak.

== Taxonomy and naming ==
Hakea purpurea was first formally described by William Jackson Hooker in 1848 and published the description in Journal of an Expedition into the Interior of Tropical Australia. Derived from the Latin purpureus meaning 'purple' or 'dull red with a tinge of blue' a reference to the colour of the flowers.

== Distribution and habitat ==
Hakea purpurea occurs in central Queensland and has an isolated occurrence in hills north of Yetman in New South Wales. Grows in open forest, woodland and heath, mostly in sandy soil.

== Cultivation ==
A very showy species good for garden cultivation. Tolerant of fairly heavy frosts and attractive to nectar eating birds.
