= Hakea 'Burrendong Beauty' =

Hybrid plant cultivar

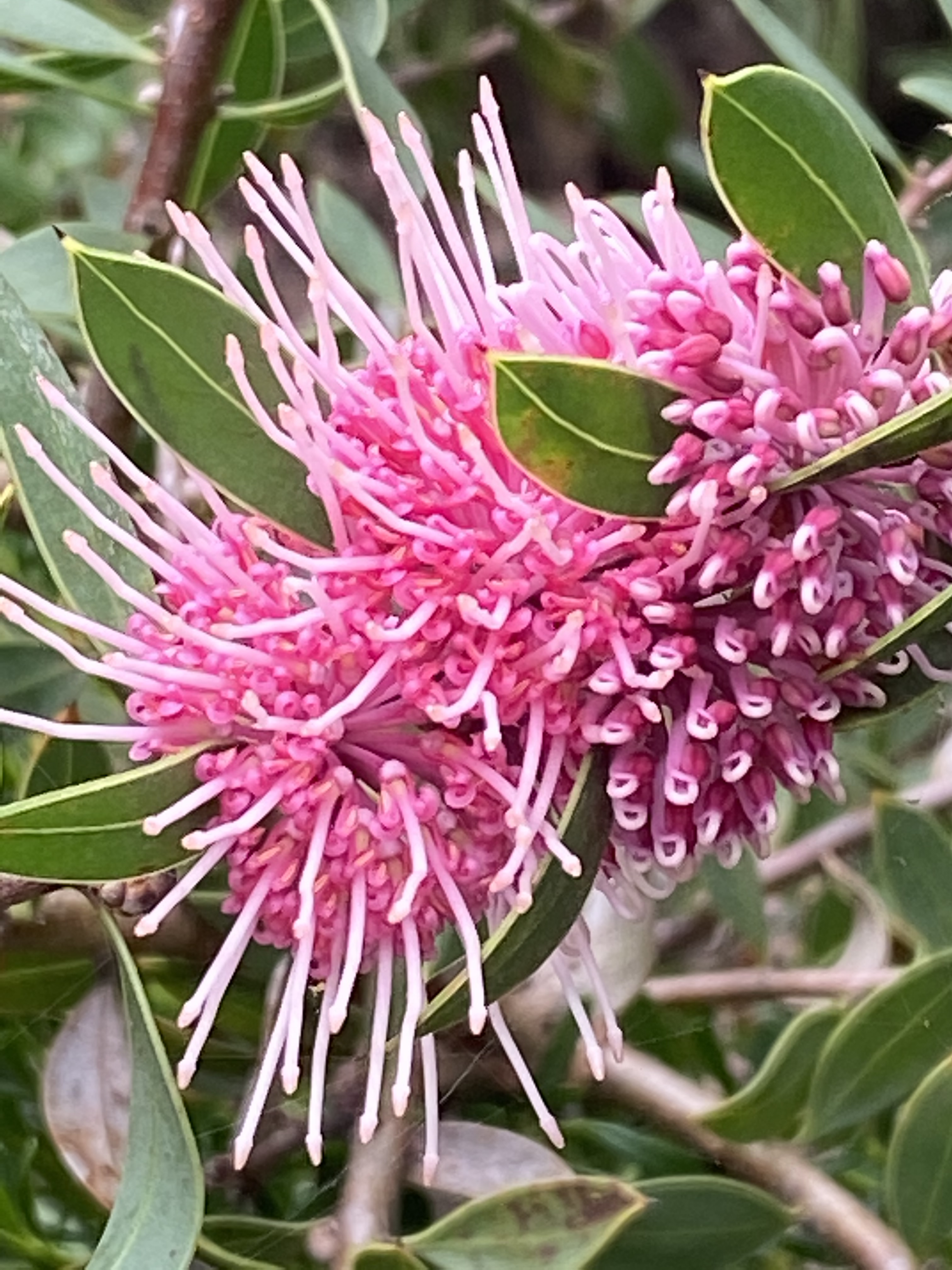
- Genus: Hakea hybrid
- Hybrid parentage: H. myrtoides × H. petiolaris
- Cultivar: 'Burrendong Beauty'
- Origin: Burrendong Arboretum

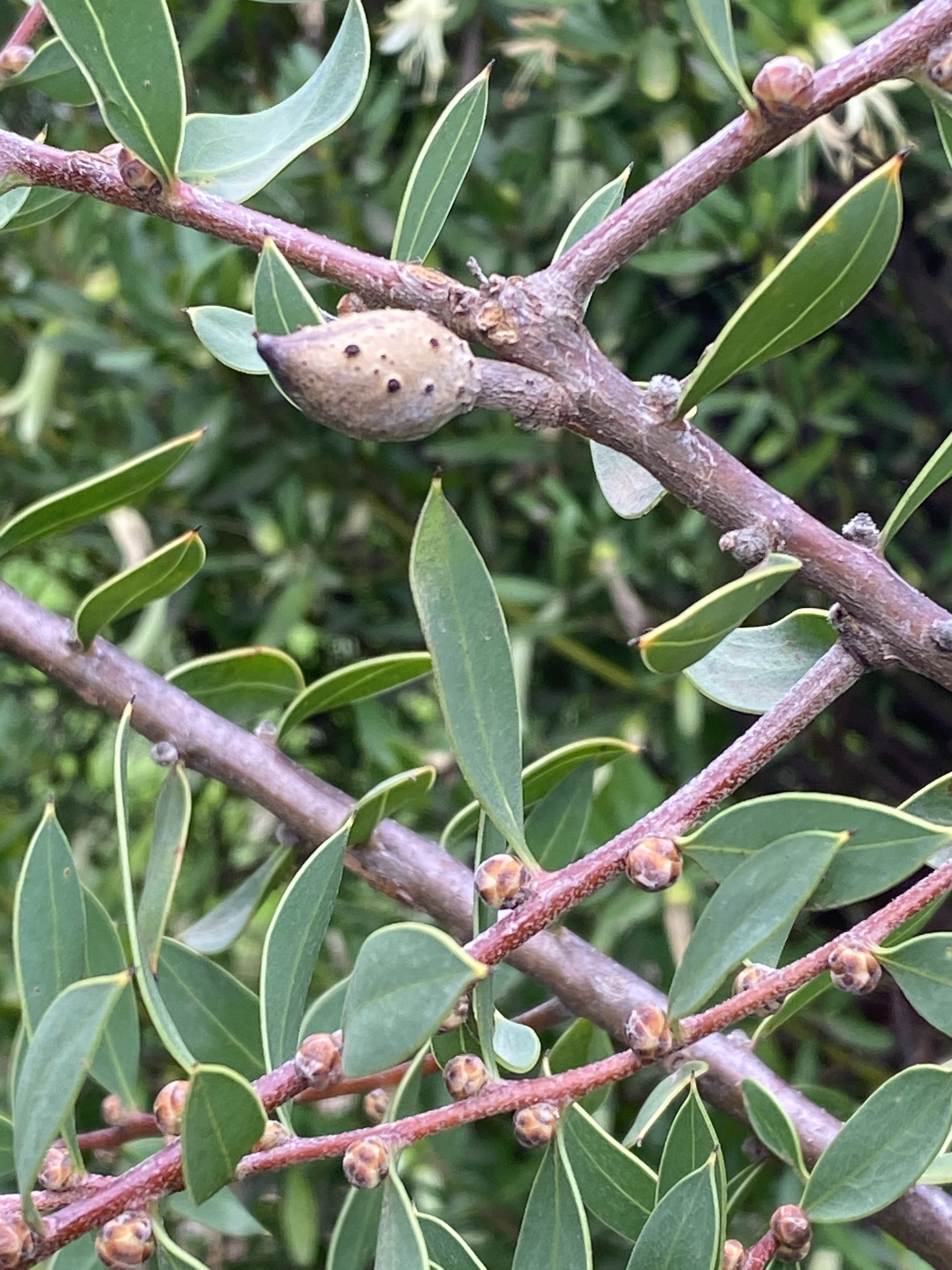
Fruit and flower buds

Hakea 'Burrendong Beauty' is a hybrid between H. myrtoides and H. petiolaris and was discovered in the Burrendong Arboretum.

== Description ==
Hakea 'Burrendong Beauty' is a small, spreading shrub to 1.5 m (4 ft 11 in) high and 2–3 m (6 ft 7 in – 9 ft 10 in) wide. It has rigid, elliptic shaped leaves 40 mm (1.6 in) long. It has deep pink, globular shaped flower, cream styles that appear in clusters in the leaf axils during winter. The hybrid plant rarely sets seed.

== Use in horticulture ==
This hybrid between two Western Australian species does not occur in nature but is well-established in general cultivation. It does best in areas of low summer humidity and requires well-drained soil in a sunny position.
