= Leioproctus rostratus =

Scientific classification
- Kingdom: Animalia
- Phylum: Arthropoda
- Clade: Pancrustacea
- Class: Insecta
- Order: Hymenoptera
- Family: Colletidae
- Genus: Leioproctus
- Species: L. rostratus

Binomial name
- Leioproctus rostratus Batley, 2025

Species of bee

Leioproctus rostratus, or Leioproctus (Euryglossidia) rostratus, is a species of bee in the family Colletidae and subfamily Colletinae. It is endemic to Australia. It was described by entomologist Michael Batley in 2025.

== Etymology ==
The specific epithet rostratus (Latin: "beaked") is an anatomical reference to the clypeus.

== Description ==
The female body length is 7.5 mm. Integumental colouration is mainly black, the metasoma orange-brown. The hair is white to brown. It has a has a large, snout-like clypeus.

== Distribution and habitat ==
The species occurs in south-west Western Australia. The type locality is 62 km east of Hyden in the eastern Wheatbelt.

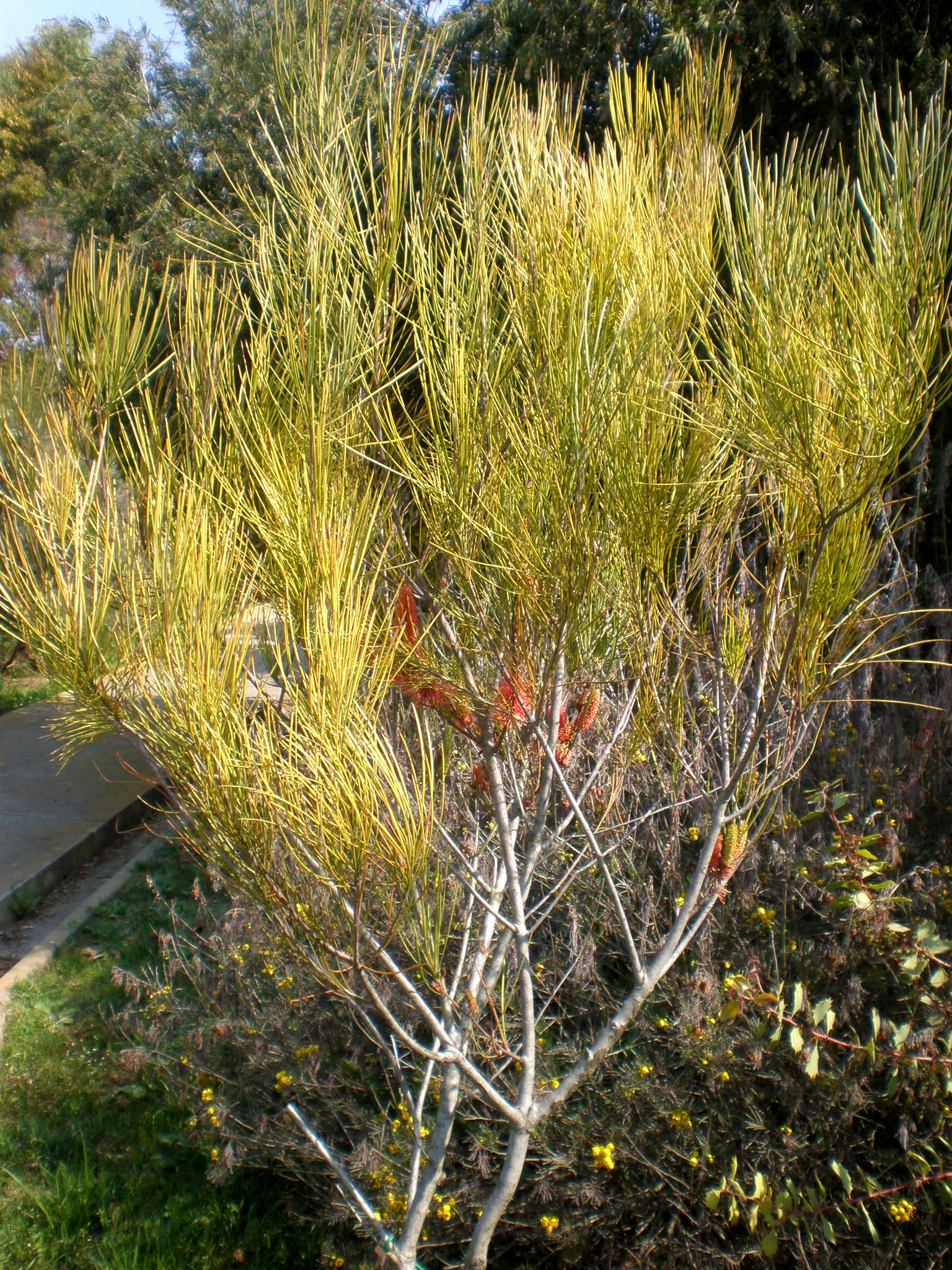
Hakea bucculenta (red pokers), a forage plant of the bees

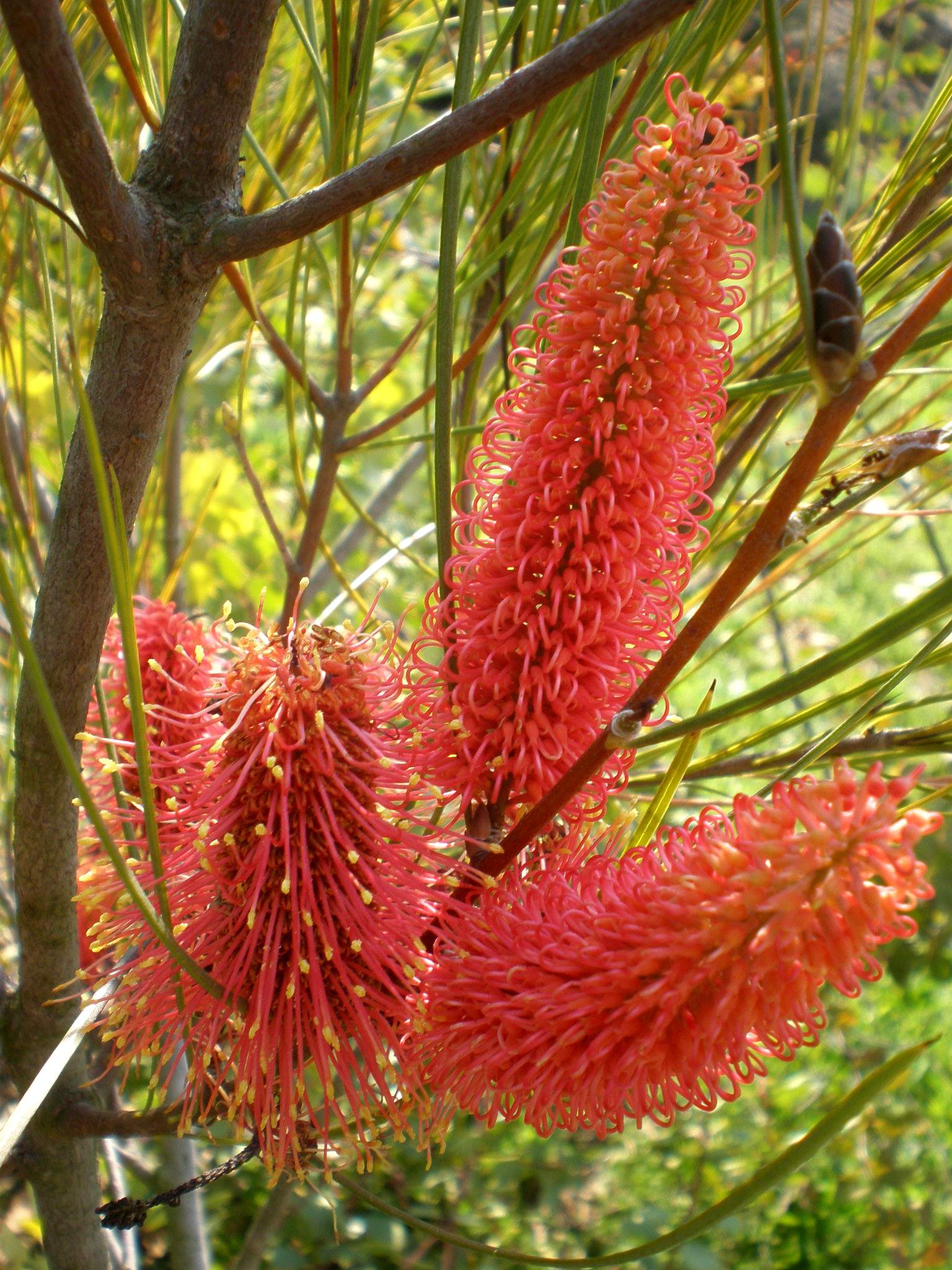
Flowers of Hakea bucculenta

== Behaviour ==
The adults are flying mellivores. Flowering plants visited by the bees include Hakea bucculenta and Hakea francisiana.
