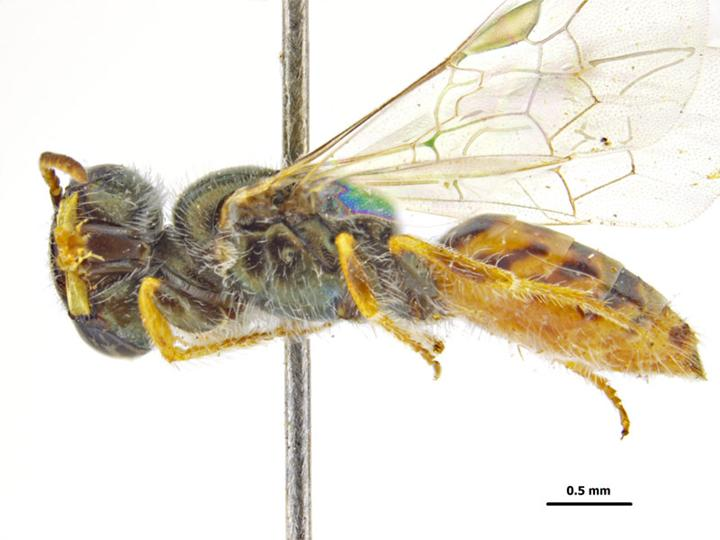
- Female

Scientific classification
- Kingdom: Animalia
- Phylum: Arthropoda
- Clade: Pancrustacea
- Class: Insecta
- Order: Hymenoptera
- Family: Colletidae
- Genus: Euhesma
- Species: E. bronzus

Binomial name
- Euhesma bronzus Exley, 2001

= Euhesma bronzus =

Species of bee

Euhesma bronzus, or Euhesma (Euhesma) bronzus, is a species of bee in the family Colletidae and the subfamily Euryglossinae. It is endemic to Australia. It was described in 2001 by Australian entomologist Elizabeth Exley.

== Distribution and habitat ==
The species occurs in arid southern and central Australia. The type locality is Penong, on the Nullarbor Plain in South Australia.

== Behaviour ==
The adults are flying mellivores. Flowering plants visited by the bees include Acacia papyrocarpa, Hakea francisiana, Daviesia aphylla and Eucalyptus socialis.

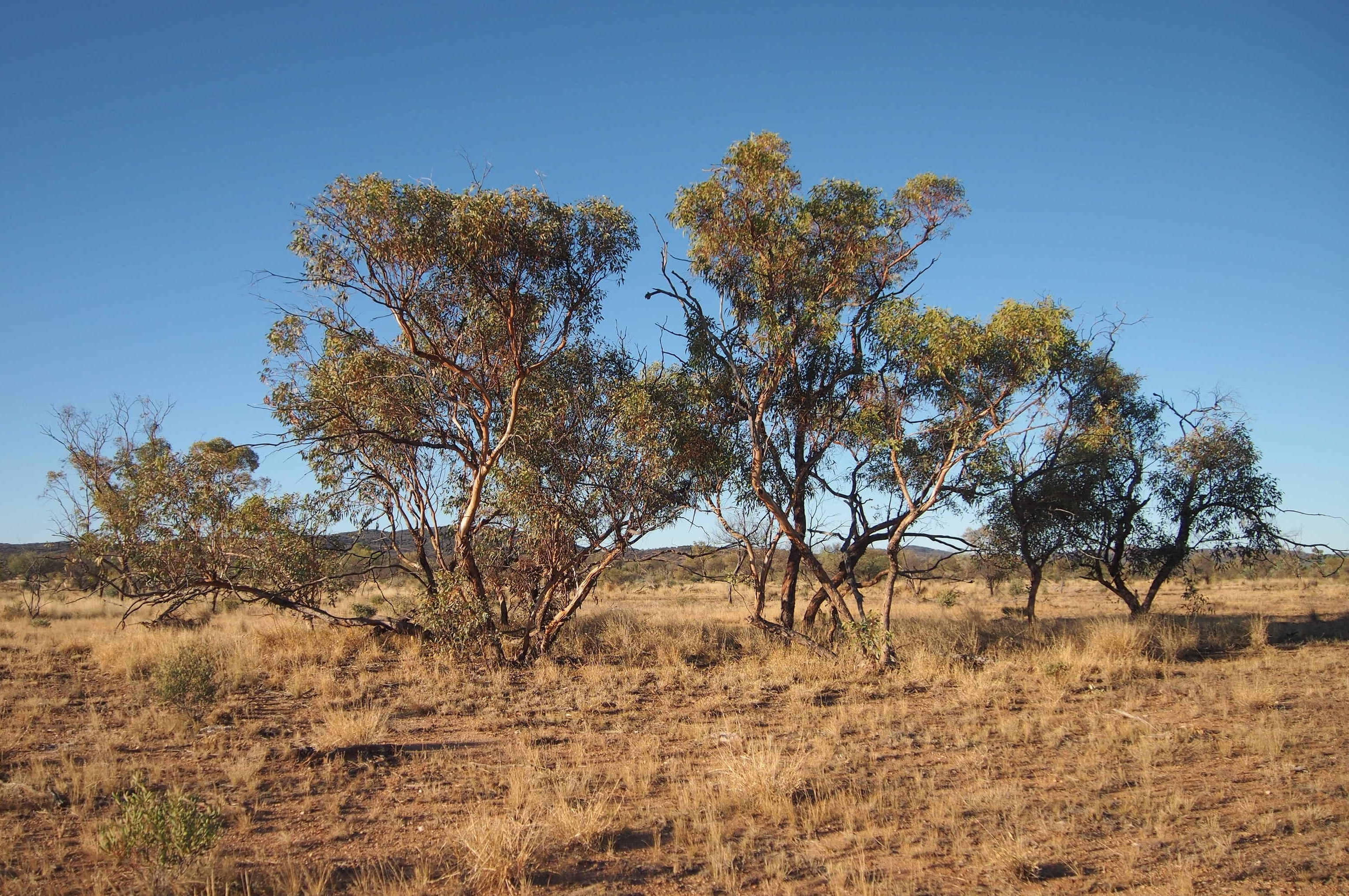
Eucalyptus socialis, or red mallee, a forage plant of the bees

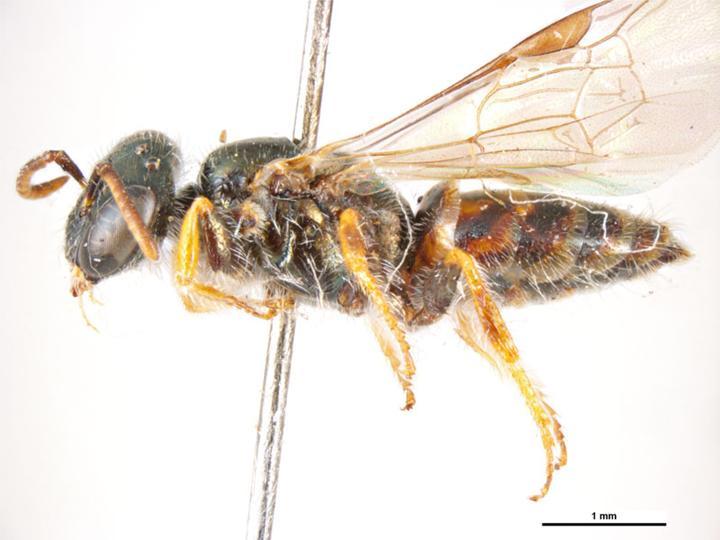
Male
