= Leioproctus mutabilis =

Scientific classification
- Kingdom: Animalia
- Phylum: Arthropoda
- Clade: Pancrustacea
- Class: Insecta
- Order: Hymenoptera
- Family: Colletidae
- Genus: Leioproctus
- Species: L. mutabilis

Binomial name
- Leioproctus mutabilis Batley, 2025

Species of bee

Leioproctus mutabilis, or Leioproctus (Euryglossidia) mutabilis, is a species of bee in the family Colletidae and subfamily Colletinae. It is endemic to Australia. It was described by entomologist Michael Batley in 2025.

== Etymology ==
The specific epithet mutabilis (Latin: "changeable") refers to the variable surface sculpture.

== Description ==
The female body length is 7 mm, the male 5 mm. Integumental colouration is mainly black, with weak iridescence and brown markings. The hair is white to brown.

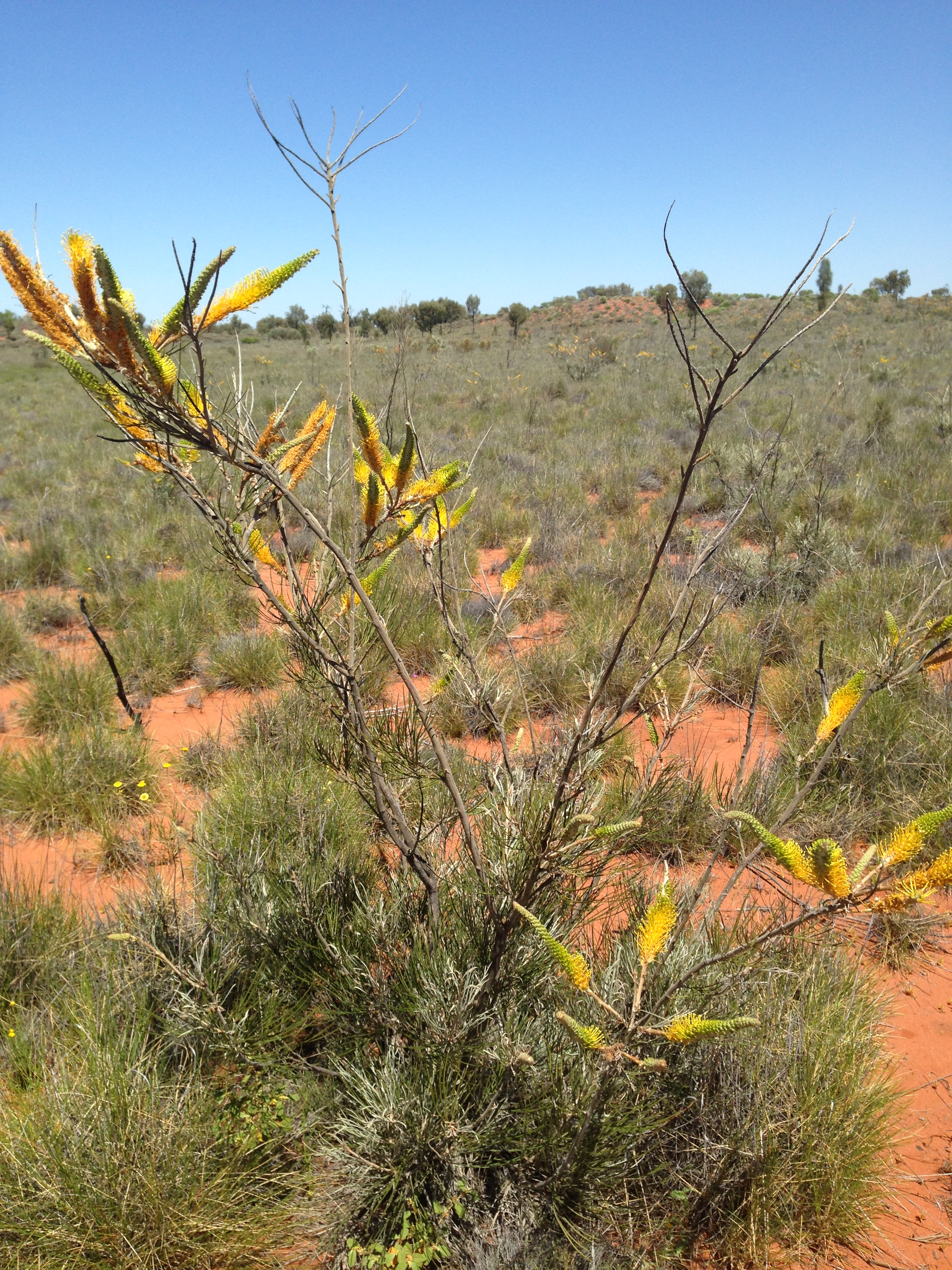
Grevillea eriostachya (honey grevillea), a forage plant of the bees

== Distribution and habitat ==
The species occurs in inland Western Australia. The type locality is 6 km west-south-west of Nalbarra Station, near Paynes Find in the Mid West region.

== Behaviour ==
The adults are flying mellivores. Flowering plants visited by the bees include Grevillea eriostachya, Hakea multilineata and Hakea preissii.

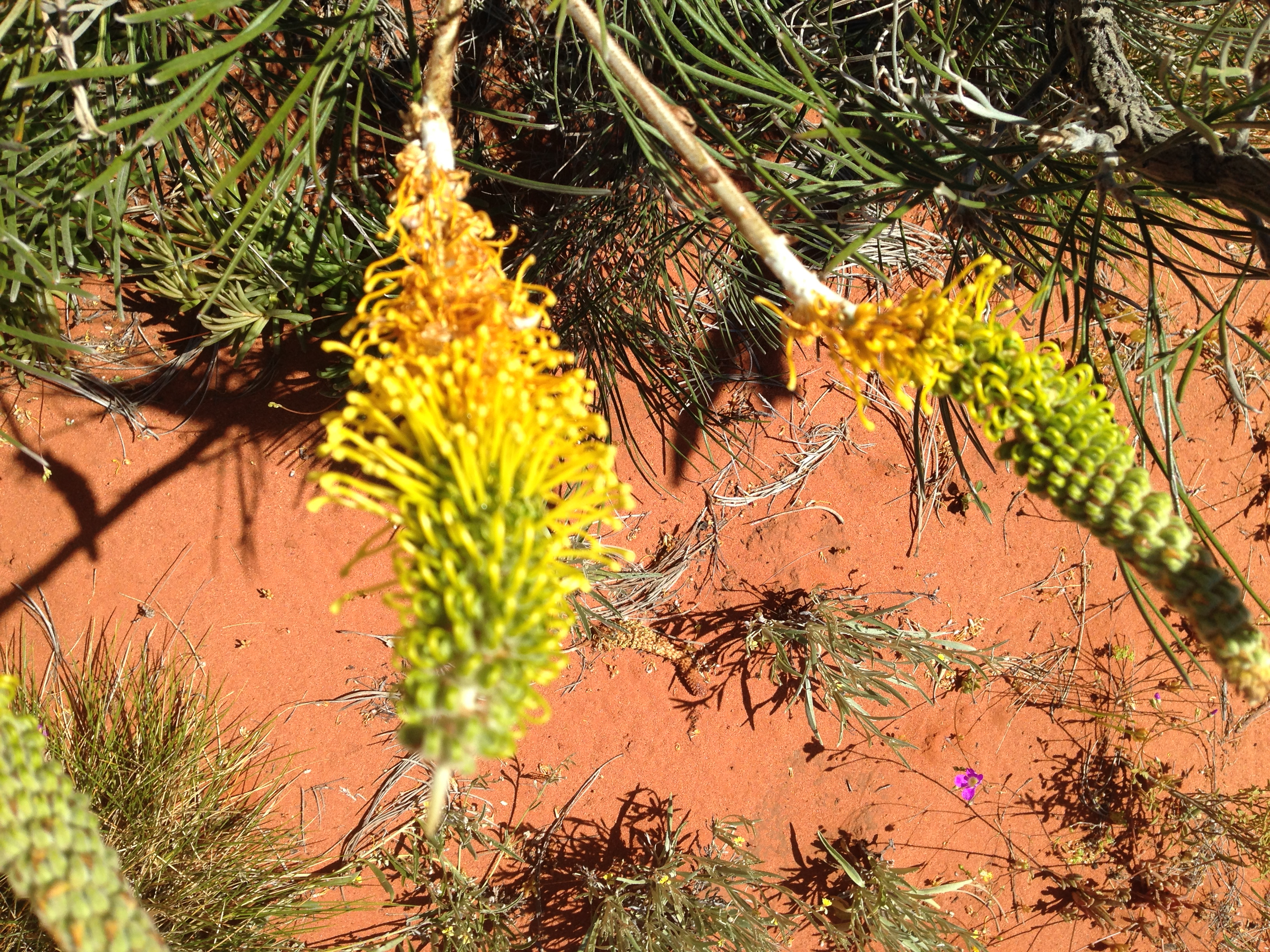
Flowers of Grevillea eriostachya
