= George William Francis =

British botanist

George William Francis (1800–9 August 1865) was an English horticulturalist and science writer. He migrated to the colony of South Australia in 1849 and became the first director of the Adelaide Botanic Garden in 1860.

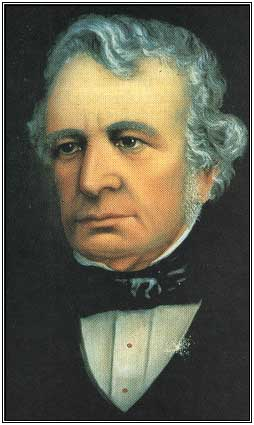
George William Francis

== Life ==
Born in London, Francis emigrated to Australia for improved prospects of supporting his family; he arrived in the Louisa Baillie on 2 September 1849. Shortly he took over the old botanical garden of Adelaide, north of the Torrens River, as a tenant. He was then appointed director of the Adelaide Botanic Garden, a position he held for the rest of his life.

Francis died of dropsy on 9 August 1865 and was buried the next day, leaving a widow and ten children.

== Legacy ==
Francis established much of the garden and pagoda in the first botanical museum in Adelaide, the Adelaide Botanic Garden. Hakea francisiana, an Australian shrub that grows to 4 metres (13 ft), is named after him.

He is credited with popularizing the peppercorn tree (Schinus areira), commonly associated with schoolyards throughout southern Australia, and notably tolerant of alkaline soils.

== Works ==
Francis published:

- Catalogue of British Plants and Ferns, 1835; 5th edition, 1840.
- Analysis of British Ferns, 1837; 5th edition, 1855.
- Little English Flora, 1839.
- Grammar of Botany, 1840.
- Chemical Experiments, 1842, abridged by W. White, 1851, and republished as Chemistry for Students.
- Favourites of the Flower Garden, 1844.
- Manual of Practical Levelling for Railways and Canals, 1846.
- Art of Modelling Wax Flowers, 1849.
- Electrical Experiments, 8th edition, 1855.
- Dict. Practical Receipts, new edition, 1857.
- Acclimatisation of Animals and Plants, Royal Society, South Australia, 1862.

Francis also edited the first five volumes of the Magazine of Science and School of Arts, 1840–5.
