= Adelaide Botanic Garden =

Botanic garden in Adelaide, South Australia

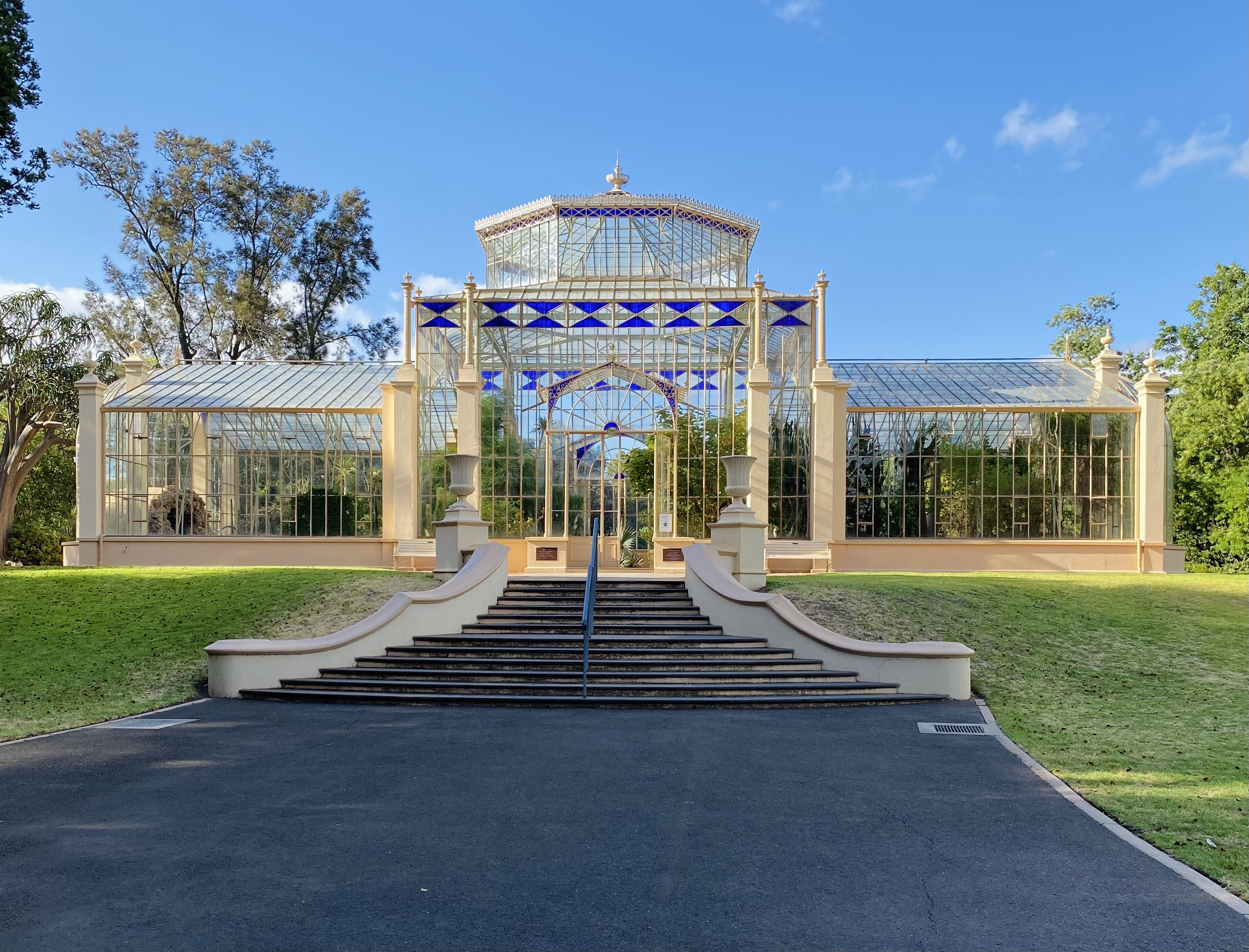
- The garden's 1877 Victorian Palm House

- Location within City of Adelaide
- Type: Botanical
- Location: Adelaide, South Australia
- Coordinates: 34°55′3″S 138°36′45″E
- Area: 51 ha (130-acre)
- Opened: 1857
- Website: www.botanicgardens.sa.gov.au

The Adelaide Botanic Garden is a 51-hectare (130-acre) public garden at the north-east corner of the Adelaide city centre, in the Adelaide Park Lands. It lies on North Terrace (between Lot Fourteen, the site of the old Royal Adelaide Hospital, and the National Wine Centre) and behind it the Botanic Park (adjacent to the Adelaide Zoo). Work was begun on the site in 1855, with its official opening to the public on 4 October 1857.

The Adelaide Botanic Garden and adjacent State Herbarium of South Australia, together with the Wittunga Botanic Garden and Mount Lofty Botanic Garden, comprise the Botanic Gardens and State Herbarium of South Australia, administered by the Board of the Botanic Gardens and State Herbarium, a state government statutory authority.

== History ==
From the first official survey carried out for the map of Adelaide, Colonel William Light intended for the planned city to have a "botanical garden". To this end, he designated a naturally occurring ait that had formed in the course of the River Torrens, in what is now the West Parklands. However attempts to establish a garden were abandoned owing to frequent flooding of the area. After a second attempt had failed, the northern bank of the Torrens, opposite the present location of the Adelaide Zoo, was considered, and it was here in 1839 that John Bailey (1800-1864), an experienced gardener and Colonial Botanist, made a third attempt, but no funding was offered. The South Australian Agricultural and Horticultural Society (formed 1842) and other groups continued to press for the creation of a public garden. The public were aware of the economic and scientific benefits of such a garden, already seen elsewhere in the British Empire. In 1854 the present site was recommended to the government by the Society and George William Francis (who had begun appealing to the Governor Sir Henry Young soon after his arrival in 1849 to establish the garden), and Francis was appointed superintendent of the garden in 1855.

In January 1855 the Legislative Council finally approved the site. The land was held sacred by the Kaurna people as the red kangaroo dreaming (Tarndanyangga), but at that time it was being used as paddocks for police horses. Francis was responsible for establishing the perimeter, solving the flooding problems and landscaping North Terrace to blend well with the entrance to the garden. In October 1855 he presented his first progress report, including a plan of Regent's Park in London as an example of circular garden design that he thought could be adapted for Adelaide.

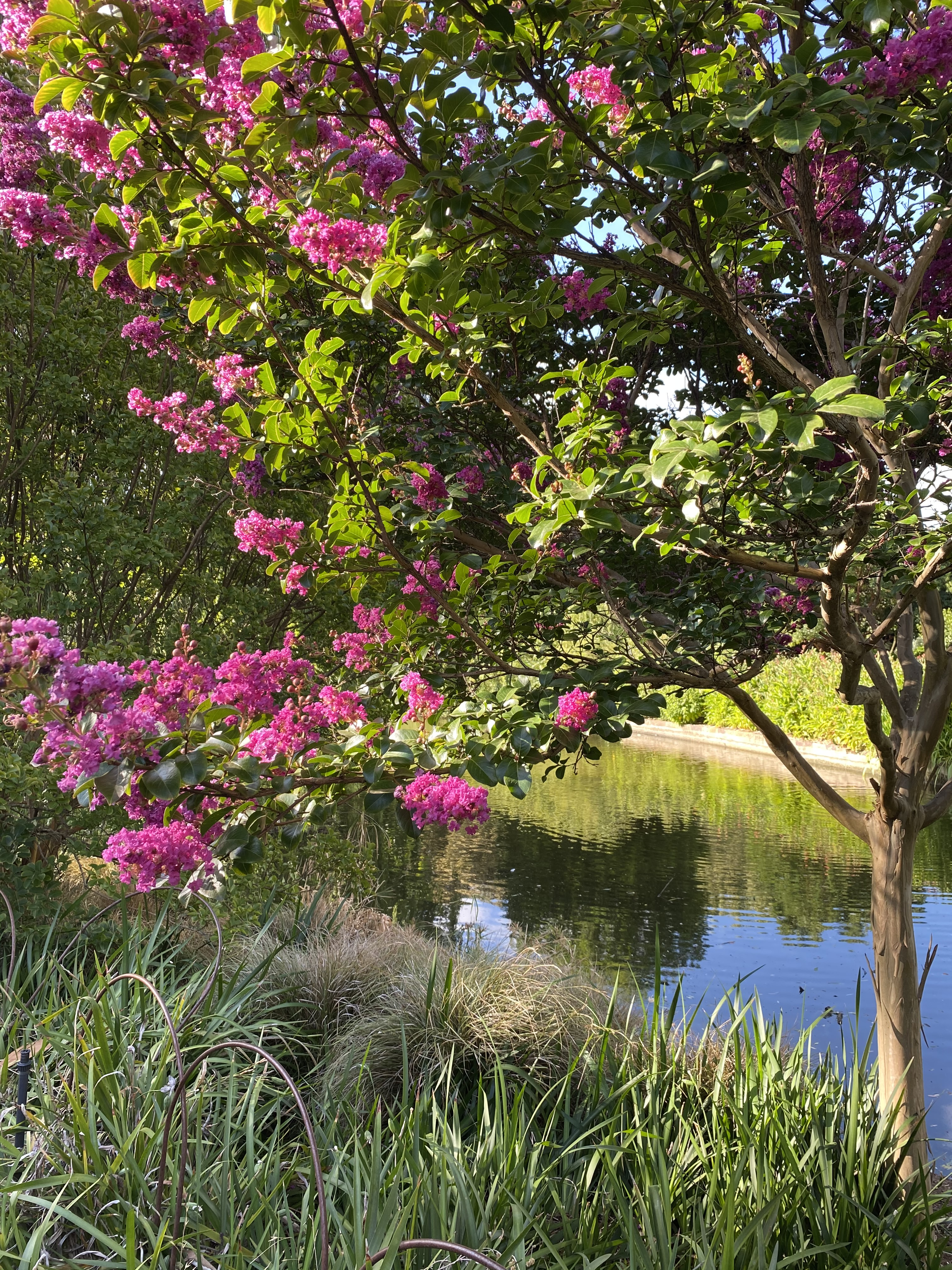
Crepe myrtle trees by a pond in the gardens.

Francis and his family moved into the superintendent's cottage in 1856, and the Garden was opened to the public on 4 October 1857. In 1860 the Botanic Garden Act was enacted, which established the Board of Governors, with Francis as Director. The site at that time included the present Botanic Garden, Botanic Park and Adelaide Zoo.

A pagoda was built in 1863, and Francis established the first herbarium and botanical library in Adelaide in 1864, a rustic temple modelled on the Museum of Economic Botany at Kew Gardens in England, with the design imitating the Parthenon in Athens. Francis gave lectures in the lecture room there each Tuesday.

Hakea francisiana, an Australian shrub that grows to 4 metres (13 ft), is named after him.

After his retirement shortly before his death in 1865, Francis was succeeded by botanist Moritz Richard Schomburgk, brother to the German naturalist Robert Hermann Schomburgk. He was a major advocate for the establishment of forest reserves in the increasingly denuded South Australian countryside.

Schomburgk's successor, M. W. Holtze I.S.O., did much to make the gardens more attractive to the general public.

Holtze retired in 1917 and was succeeded by John Frederick Bailey, grandson of John Bailey (mentioned above) and son of Frederick Manson Bailey. He proved so successful that public service regulations were waived to extend his directorship (and occupancy of the Lodge) past mandatory retirement age.

== Historic buildings ==
=== Palm House ===
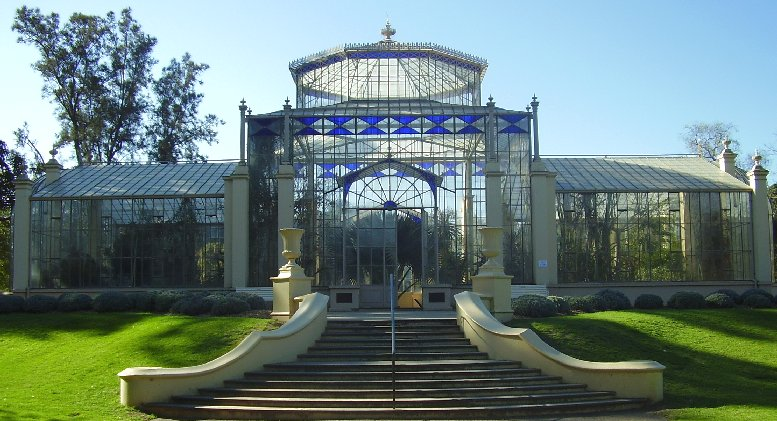
The Palm (or Tropical) House's entrance

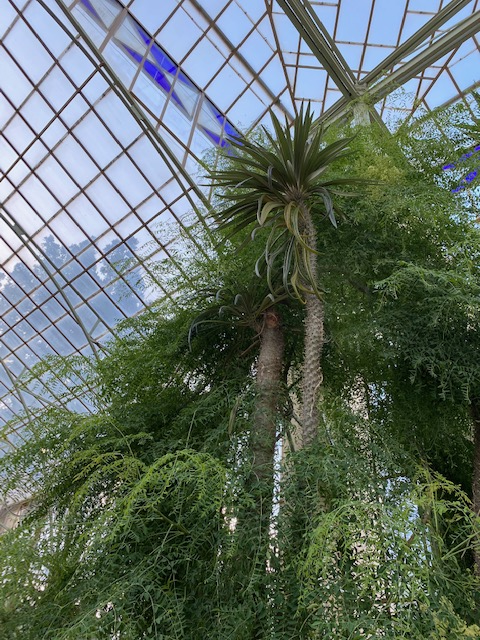
Inside the Palm House

The Palm, or Tropical, House is a Victorian-era glasshouse located to the west of the main lake. It was designed by the German architect Gustav Runge (1822-1900) and imported from Bremen, Germany in 1875. It was opened in 1877 and was restored in 1995 and 2018. It is the second-oldest glasshouse in Australia, and the only known one of German manufacture from that period left in the world, all others having been destroyed during World War II. Originally housing tropical flora, due to corrosion problems, since the early 1990s it has held a collection of Malagasy arid flora.

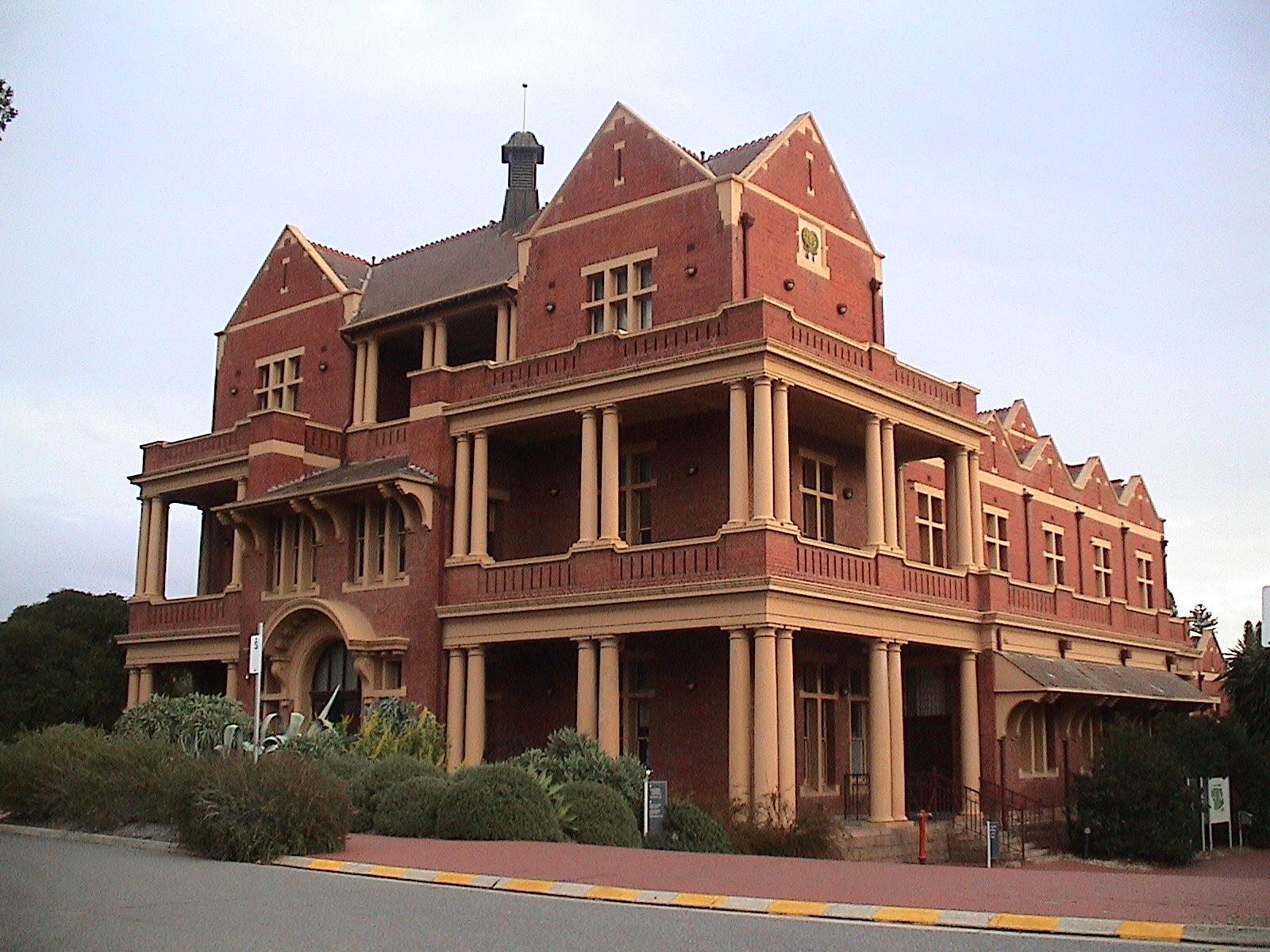
The Goodman Building from Hackney Road

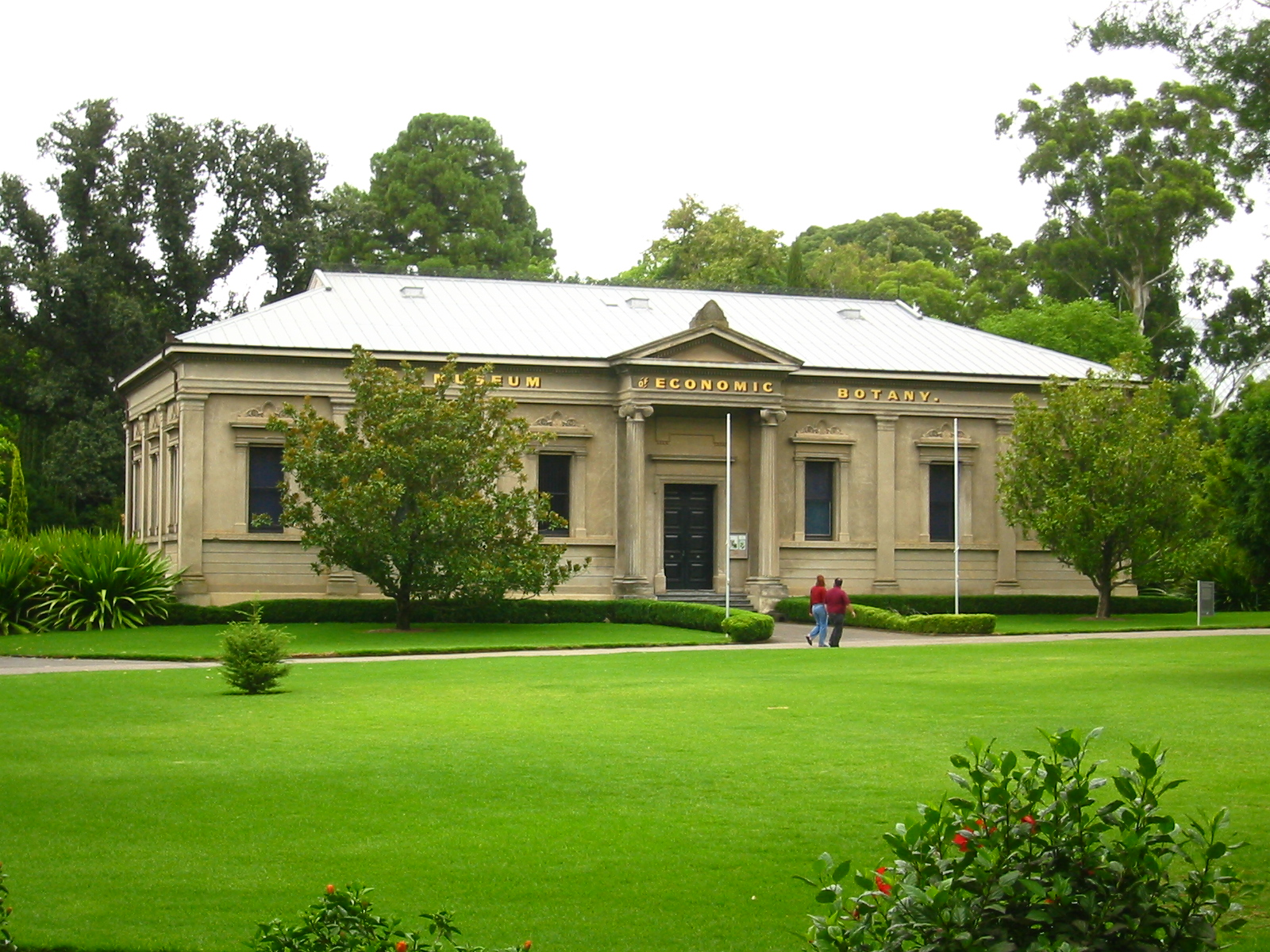
The Museum of Economic Botany

=== Museum of Economic Botany ===
The Museum of Economic Botany is dedicated to the collection and interpretation of "useful" plants. It was established by Schomburgk in 1879. Described as "the last purpose-built colonial museum in the world", it is located within the gardens a short distance to the west of the Goodman Building. Built in Greek Revival style and opened in May 1881, the building and its interior was extensively restored during 2008–09. The restoration works were assisted by a grant from the Government of Australia for $1.125 million and sponsorship by South Australian oil and gas company, Santos. The sponsorship arrangement also included naming rights and a commitment to ongoing support of the museum's exhibition program. Much of the collection originally on display in 1881 was reinstated, including a collection of papier mache and stucco replicas of various fruits and fungi. A space for temporary exhibitions within the museum was created by Khai Liew Design. Displays of Aboriginal artefacts, a subject neglected by the original museum, were prepared in collaboration with the South Australian Museum.

The museum is notable for the completeness of its preservation. The building, its interior decoration, showcases, collections and even many labels have survived from as early as 1865. The museum is on the Register of State Heritage Items, the Register of the City of Adelaide Heritage Items, and has been classified by the National Trust of Australia.

=== Goodman Building and State Herbarium ===
The administrative headquarters of the Botanic Garden is located in the historic Goodman Building, at the Hackney Road entrance on the eastern side of the gardens. This was built in 1909 as the headquarters of the Municipal Tramways Trust, and named for its longtime Chief Engineer and General Manager W. G. T. Goodman. The adjacent Tram Barn A has been converted to hold the State Herbarium.

=== Adelaide Lunatic Asylum and morgue ===
The old morgue built in 1882 for the Adelaide Lunatic Asylum, and later used by the Parkside Lunatic Asylum, still stands. The Adelaide Lunatic Asylum opened in 1852 in the grounds of the Royal Adelaide Hospital, just east of the buildings, was closed in 1873 and demolished in 1938 after the land was handed over to the Botanic Garden. The old morgue building, labelled on a nearby plaque as "Mortuary", has recently been in use as a toolshed, but was brought into service for the 2020 Adelaide Biennial of Australian Art to house an art installation by Yhonnie Scarce called In the Dead House. The work references the practices of "body-shoppers", who traded in whole or parts of dead bodies.

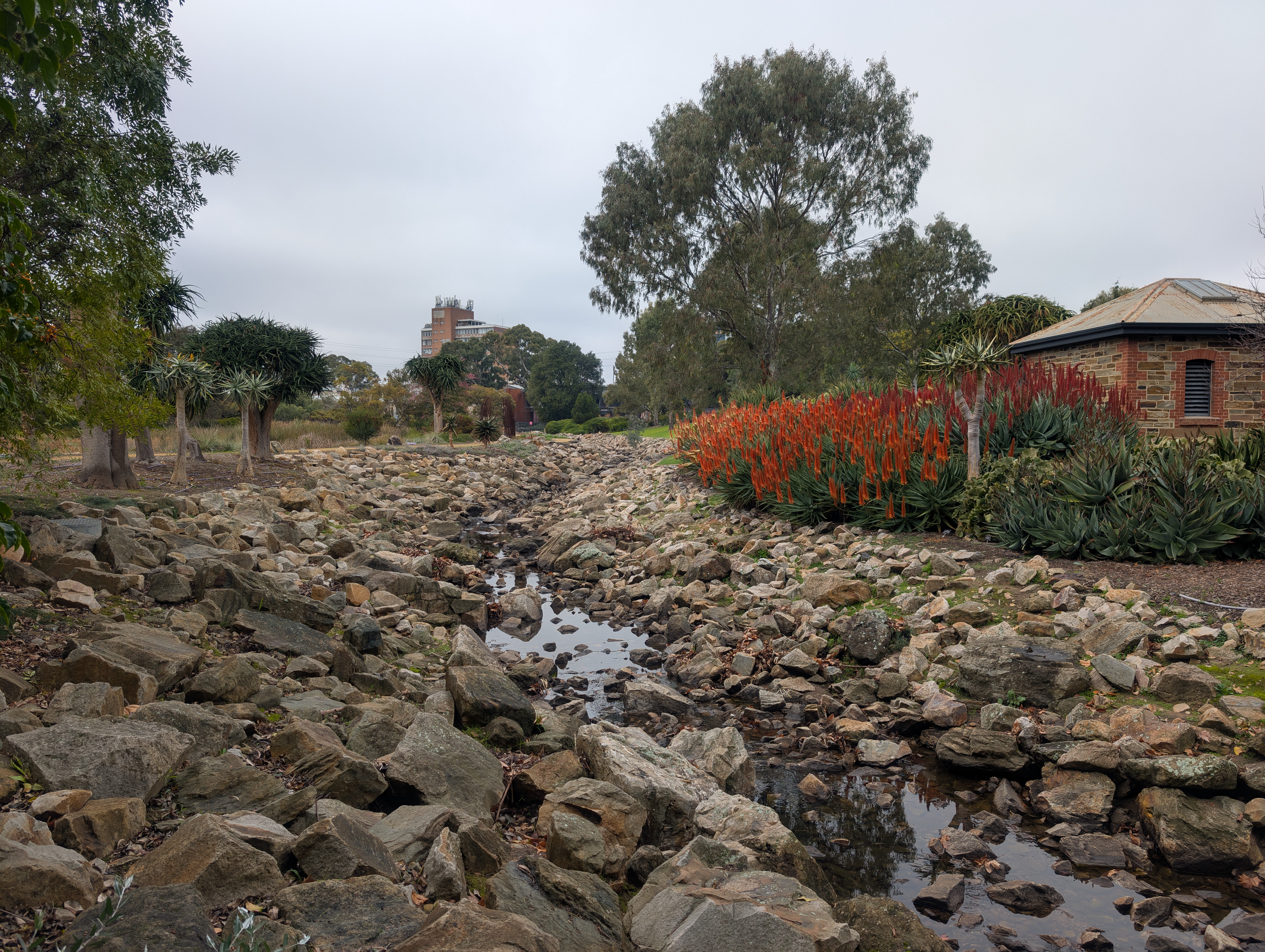
First Creek with the tiny, stone Deadhouse on the right

== Displays ==
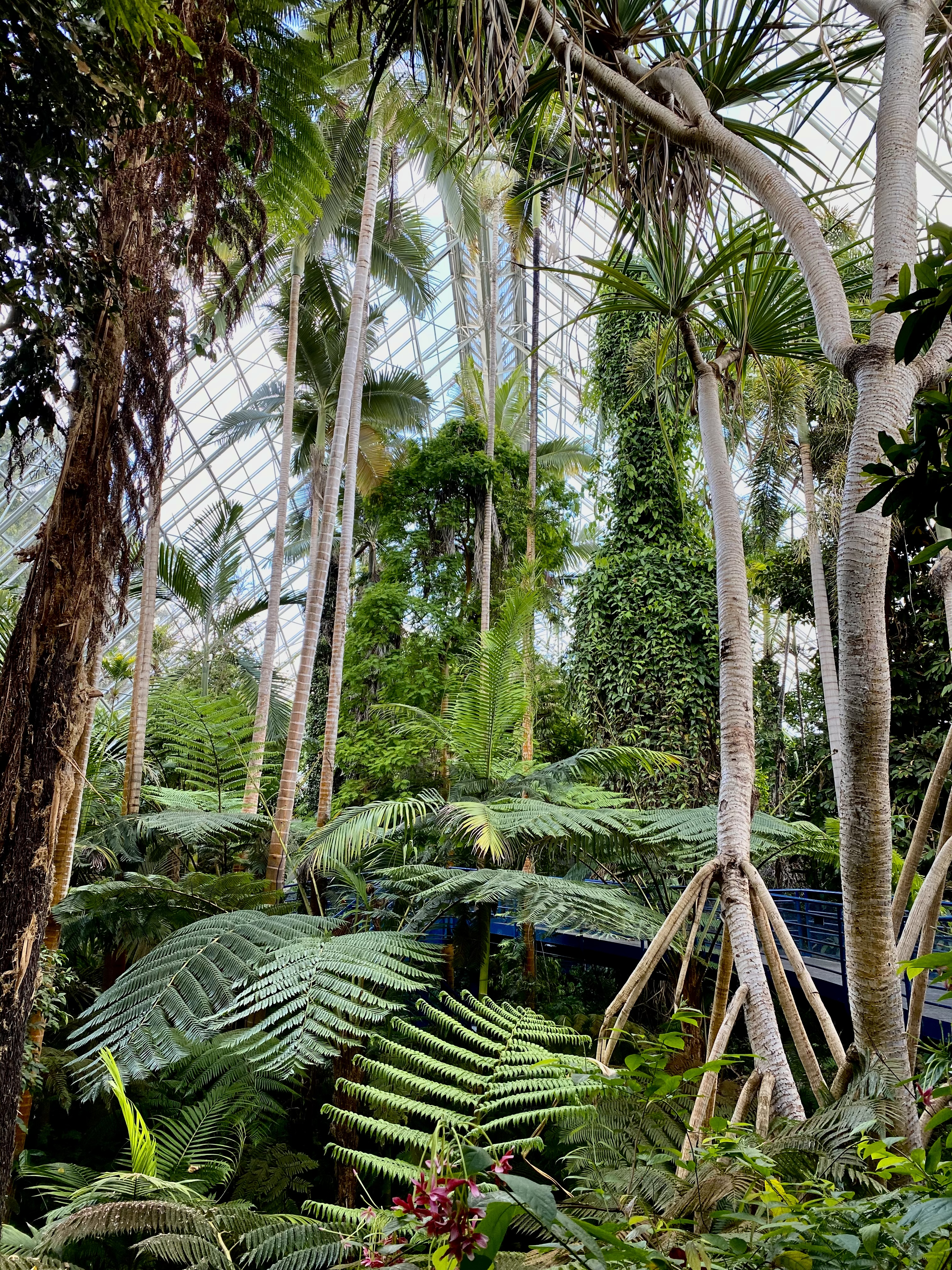
Interior of the Bicentennial Conservatory.

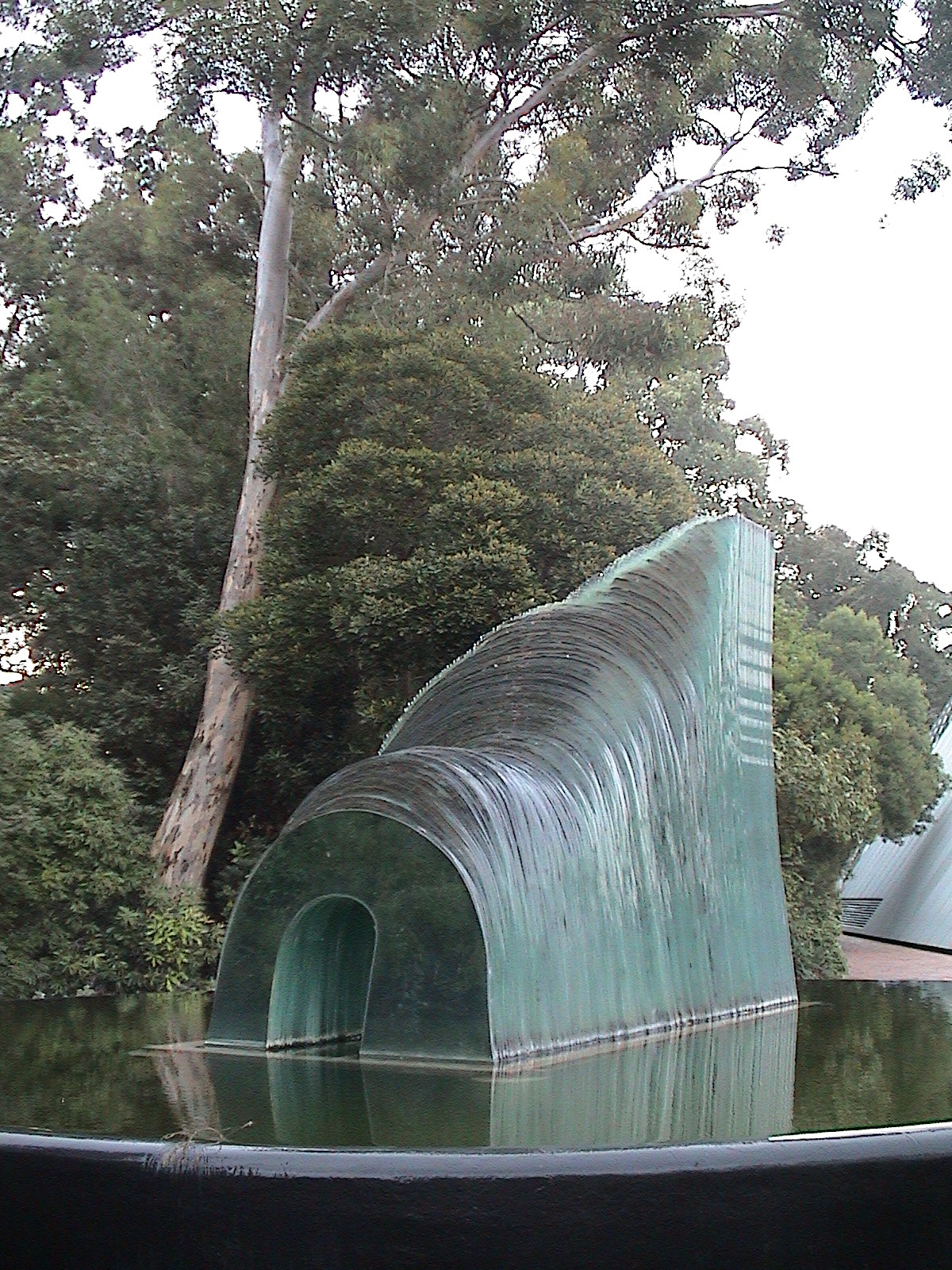
Cascade glass sculpture by Sergio Redegalli, south of the Bicentennial Conservatory

Among other scientific and educational displays of native and international horticulture, the gardens hold one of the earliest propagated specimens of the Wollemi Pine tree, which was discovered as recently as 1994.

=== Bicentennial Conservatory ===
As part of Adelaide's celebration of the Australian Bicentenary, the conservatory was constructed in 1987 and opened in late 1989. The building was designed by local architect Guy Maron and has won awards for its design, engineering and landscaping. It is 100 metres (328 ft) long, 47 metres (154 ft) wide and 27 metres (89 ft) high making it the largest single span conservatory in the Southern Hemisphere.

The conservatory originally housed at-risk or endangered tropical rainforest plants from northern Australia, Papua New Guinea, Indonesia and south Pacific Islands. In early 2012, budget cuts resulted in the controversial decision to no longer heat the building and to remove tropical plants from the conservatory. In April 2012, the entry fee to the conservatory was abolished.

In 2014 the Conservatory was awarded the Jack Cheesman Award for Enduring Architecture by the Australian Institute of Architects.

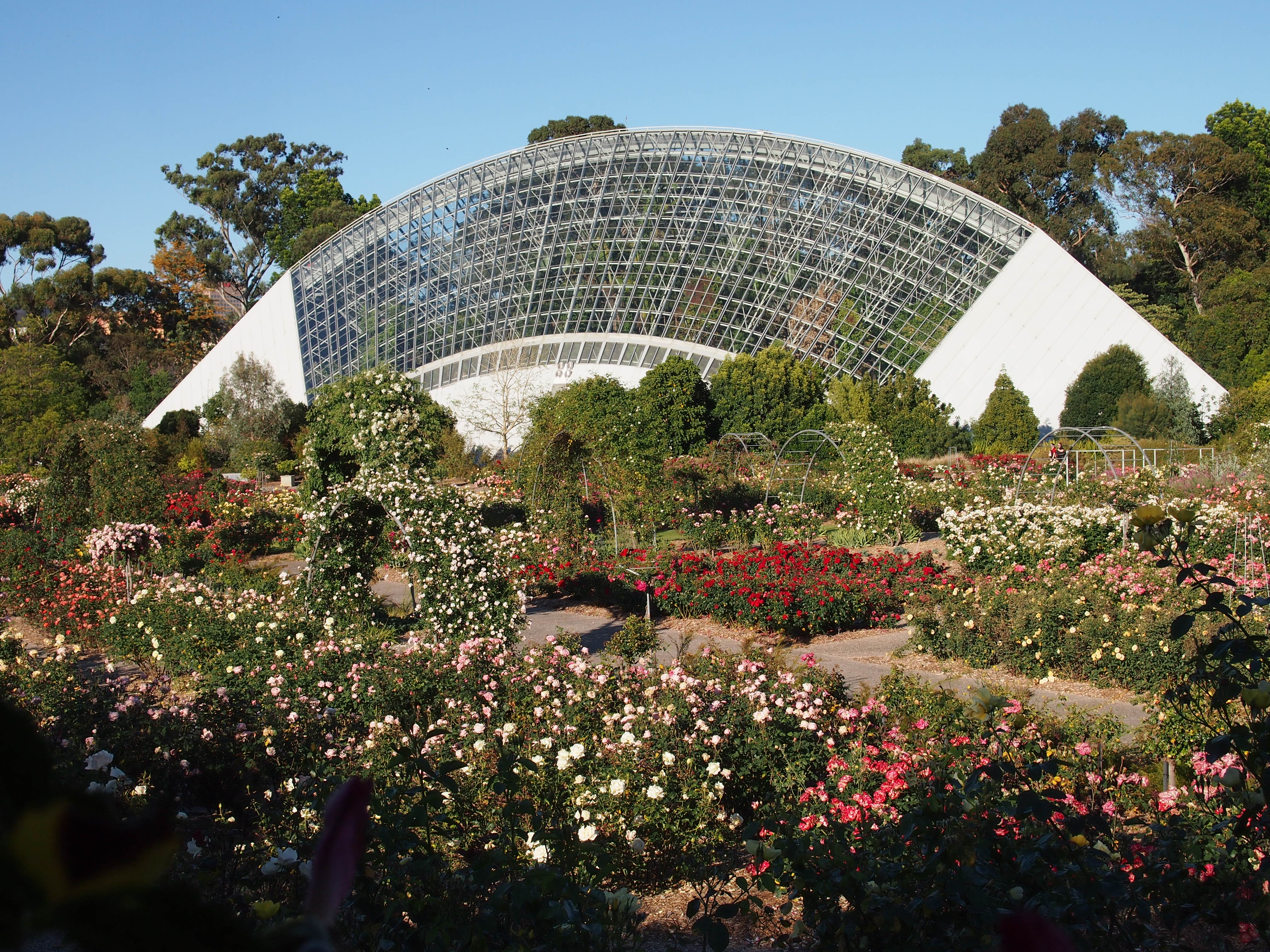
Rose Garden and Bicentennial Conservatory

=== Rose garden ===
Begun in 1996, the National Rose Trial Garden is the first garden of its kind in Australia where roses are tested for their suitability for Australian climates. The garden is a joint venture between the Adelaide Botanic Gardens, the National Rose Trial Society of Australia and the rose industry. It has been built on part of the former Municipal Tramways Trust Hackney Depot. Roses are planted in groups such as, noisette roses, bourbon roses, tea roses, ramblers, and perpetual roses. A trial is conducted over two growing seasons and all plants are treated equally with regard to horticultural practices. The roses are judged by a panel of 10 experienced rosarians who examine them and allocate points over the two growing seasons. The results are announced publicly at the end of the trial and the best performing roses receive an award.

While in Adelaide in 2004, Sir Cliff Richard planted a rose named 'Sir Cliff Richard' in the Rose Garden surrounded by a small group of fans and rose enthusiasts. Sales of the rose support the Bone Growth Foundation.

== First Creek Wetlands ==
In order to reduce the garden's reliance on potable water, primarily from the River Murray, a new wetlands system was constructed south-east of the Bicentennial Conservatory to hold stormwater diverted from First Creek. The wetlands form part of an aquifer storage and recovery system which is expected to have a usable capacity of 100 megalitres (22,000,000 imp gal) per year, enough to water the entire Botanic Garden. The project was launched in March 2011 and was opened in November 2013.

One significant purpose of the wetlands is to educate the public on the importance of wetlands, and to showcase plants which may never otherwise have been encountered by visitors. The area accommodates about 20,000 plants, including many Australian natives. The 2.6-hectare (6.4-acre) site also features a trail of interpretive signage, tiered garden beds showcasing aquatic plants and three large ponds with reed-beds which support a diverse range of native wildlife.

== Governance and funding ==
The entity known as "Botanic Gardens and State Herbarium of South Australia" includes three public gardens: Adelaide Botanic Garden; Wittunga Botanic Garden; and Mount Lofty Botanic Garden, as well as the State Herbarium and South Australian Seed Conservation Centre. and administered by the Board of the Botanic Gardens and State Herbarium, a State Government statutory authority, based on the Botanic Gardens and State Herbarium Act 1978 and Botanic Gardens and State Herbarium Regulations 2007.

Lucy Sutherland was appointed as the Director in 2016. In July 2021, Michael Harvey commenced as Director.

The gardens receive funding from the Government of South Australia, supplemented by sponsorship and community donations administered by the Adelaide Botanic Gardens Foundation. Funds are raised for the purposes of "scientific research, education, acquisition and maintenance of living collections and for the long-term financial security of the Gardens." The foundation is the trustee of the not-for-profit Adelaide Botanic Gardens Foundation Fund.

=== Sponsorship ===
As of 2019, the garden received support from "program partners" Santos and Electranet, an NFP and a private sponsor. There were also a number of supporting partners".

== Research publication ==
The State Herbarium of South Australia publishes an open-access, peer-reviewed scientific journal on behalf of the Board of the Botanic Gardens and State Herbarium, Swainsona (2017-, Volume 30-). This was previously published as Journal of the Adelaide Botanic Gardens (1976-2016, Volumes 1-29). The journal has a focus on Australasian taxa.

== New expansions ==
The demolition of a couple of non-heritage buildings in the old Royal Adelaide Hospital site has meant that parts of the garden need to be blocked for safety reasons.

== Tram stop ==
There is a stop on the Glenelg tram line on North Terrace outside the Botanic Garden. This is the last stop on the BTANIC line, which runs to the Adelaide Entertainment Centre, and trips are free on this line.

Preceding station	Adelaide Metro	Following station
University towards Adelaide Entertainment Centre	Glenelg tram line	Terminus

== In popular culture ==
The Adelaide Botanic Garden features in the 2023 film Emotion Is Dead, written and directed by Pete Williams.

== See also ==
- Botanic Park, Adelaide
- List of Adelaide parks and gardens
