= Sergio Redegalli =

Australian glass artist

- Born: 1962 (age 63–64)
- Education: Sydney College of the Arts
- Known for: Glass artist
- Notable work: Cascade World Expo 1988
- Awards: Queen Scout – 1st North Epping; 1980
- Website: www.cydoniaglass.com.au

Sergio Redegalli is an Australian glass artist specialising in glass sculptures. He is an owner of the Cydonia Glass Studio located in Newtown, New South Wales. Redegalli graduated from Sydney College of the Arts with a Bachelor of Arts Glass (Visual Arts) in 1984 and a Graduate Diploma – Glass Visual Arts in 1988. Whilst attending college, Redegalli has claimed, he was the subject of victimisation at the hands of "man hating lesbians". His glass sculpture Cascade was commissioned for the World Expo in Brisbane in 1988. This massive 12 ton sculpture in the shape of a cascading wave is on display in Adelaide Botanic Garden, Adelaide. He is currently the President of the Chamber of Commerce, at Tocumwal in the Riverina region of New South Wales.

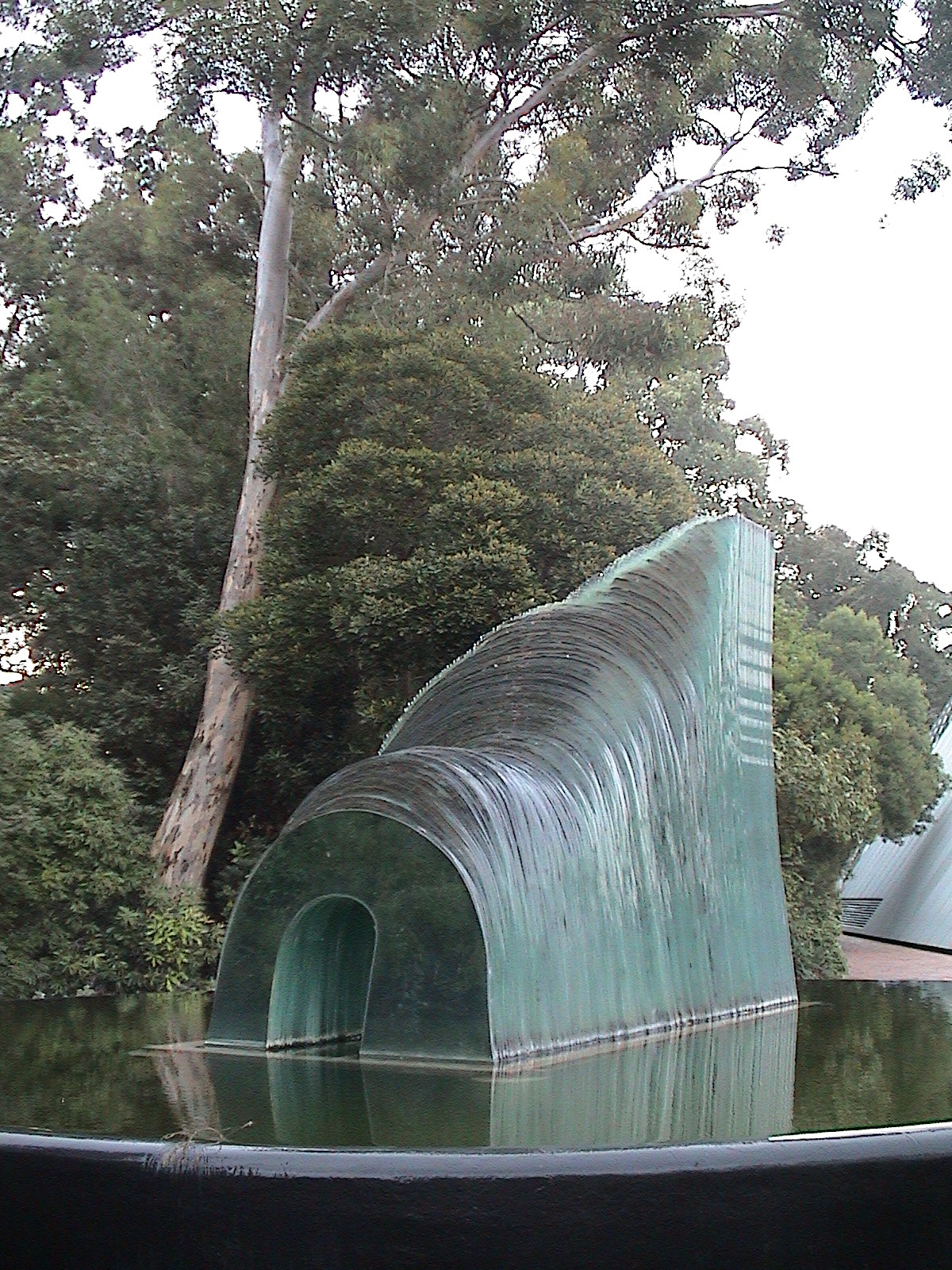
Cascade glass sculpture by Sergio Redegalli, in the Adelaide Botanic Garden

== Boards ==
- 1982–87 Sydney College of the arts student Association
- 1984–87 Sydney youth festival
- 1992–2000 Newtown Main Street committee
- 2007–2010 Workcover Workplace Improvement Strategies Unit Manufacturing Team

== Exhibitions ==
- 1984
  Graduate Exhibition at Sydney college of the Arts
  Small work exhibition at the Glass Artists Gallery in Sydney
  Christmas Show at the Glass Artists Gallery in Sydney
- 1985
  Two person show with Nadia Bachmaier at Glass artists gallery
  Third National Glass Biennial in Wagga Wagga NSW
  Meat Market (Arts House) Melbourne
- 1986
  Penrith Regional Art Gallery in NSW
- 1987
  'Glass in Public Spaces' at the Westpac Arts center in Melbourne
- 1988
  World Expo'88 in Brisbane
  Members show at the Glass Artists Gallery in Sydney
  Graduate Exhibition (Ex Sydney College of the Arts) at pier 2-3 in sydney
- 1989
  Park Royal Hotel in Parramatta NSW
- 1990
  Fisher's Ghost statue/marquette at compbelltown city council NSW
- 1993
  'Faces of Mars' Solo exhibition at the glass artists Gallery in Sydney
- 2008
  'ARCHY/TYPE' at the Glass Artists Gallery in Sydney
  'Retrospect'-80's & 90's Australian Contemporary Glass at the Glass Artists Gallery in Sydney
  'Art London' in Chelsea London
  Gallery opening at the Vitria Gallery in Singapore
- 2009
  'Art Sydney' at the Exhibition hall in Randwick Sydney
- 2010
  'Ode to the Pharoh' at the Glass Artists Gallery in sydney
  'Blast Off' at the Glass Artists gallery in Sydney

== Political work ==
Redegalli is critical of cultural pluralism within contemporary Australian society which he claims has come about due to "the stupidity of multiculturalism". In particular Redegalli is critical of Australian Muslims, of whom he has stated:

"it is very difficult for anyone who is Muslim to fit into any society, in truth, because sooner or later, if there’s enough people that want to instigate Islam in its most common form, it naturally then clashes with the host society, full stop, it’s been proven through history".

In September 2010 Redegalli painted a mural on his outer studio wall of a woman in a full-face Muslim covering with a strike symbol over her face and the words Say No To Burqas. The mural, visible from major train lines, has been defaced with paint countless times by protesters. Redegalli has claimed to have the support of the Marrickville community "10 to one". Community leaders have condemned the mural and former Mayor Sam Iskandar has stated that the mural, "goes against the values which the Marrickville community has believed in and practiced for generations".

In December 2010, members of the far right political group, the Australian Protectionist Party, described in an Australian Newspaper headline as "anti Islamist", were encouraged to meet at the mural after being contacted by Redegalli. The intention was counteract a planned anti mural protest by persons whom Redegalli labelled as 'socialists' and 'renters'. The resultant protest lead to the arrest of seven anti-mural protesters.

A complaint was lodged by a local Muslim woman with the NSW Anti-Discrimination Board claiming that the mural is feeding racist and sexist attitudes. The supporters of the mural have voiced their concerns about security and the rise of Islamic extremism in Australia.

In a February 2012 radio interview Redegalli argued that Burqas are dangerous to wear while driving, and allow wearers to conceal their identities. To demonstrate his claims, Redegalli said that he had driven a car in a Burqa, and had gone to inappropriate locations including a female public toilet with other large men, without being challenged. Redegalli was criticized by a caller during the interview, who told Redegalli to "get a life" and suggested that Redegalli's motivation was less about the burqa and more about putting himself "in the spotlight". Redegalli reacted by dismissing the criticism as a "typical Muslim rant".

Redegalli and his mural were featured on episode 1 of the ABC television program, Dumb, Drunk and Racist on 20 June 2012. While being interviewed, Redegalli was heckled by a passer-by offended by the artwork.

As of September 2016, the mural has been removed from the wall of the building as seen from Google Street View.

On 27 October 2014, Redegalli and two other members of the group, Faceless attempted to enter the federal parliament house wearing a Ku Klux Klan mask, full-face Muslim covering and a motorcycle helmet. Redegalli, who was wearing the Ku Klux Klan mask told the media "If you are a Muslim female, you're allowed to have totally separate set of rules than the rest of others, it's strange." He also said the group does not support the Ku Klux Klan.
