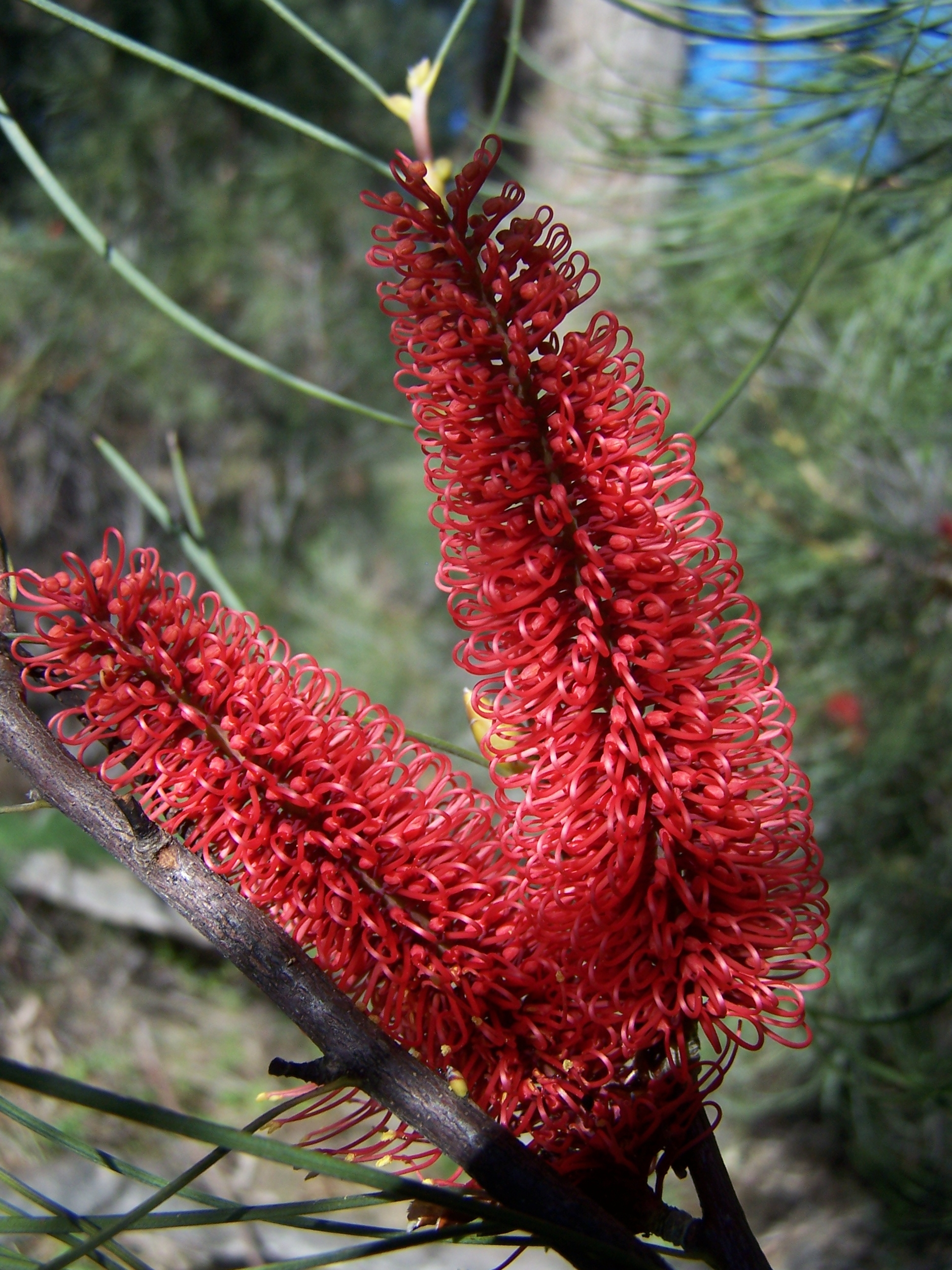
- In Kings Park

Conservation status
- Near Threatened (IUCN 3.1)

Scientific classification
- Kingdom: Plantae
- Clade: Tracheophytes
- Clade: Angiosperms
- Clade: Eudicots
- Order: Proteales
- Family: Proteaceae
- Genus: Hakea
- Species: H. bucculenta

Binomial name
- Hakea bucculenta C.A.Gardner
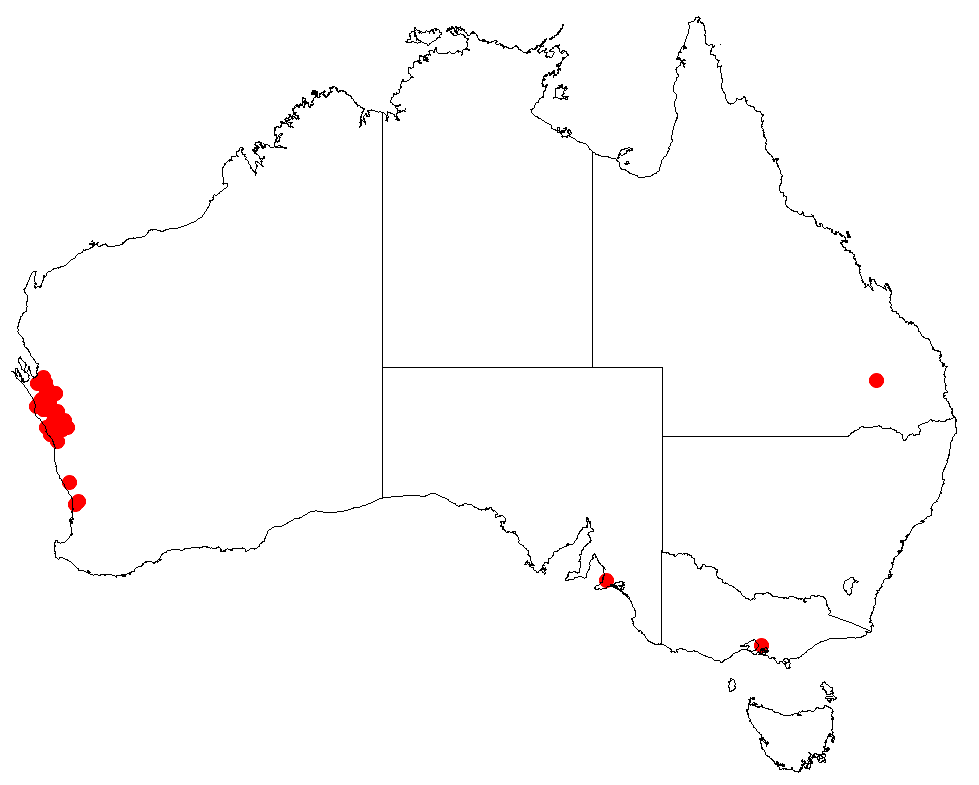
- Occurrence data from AVH

= Hakea bucculenta =

Species of shrub endemic to Western Australia

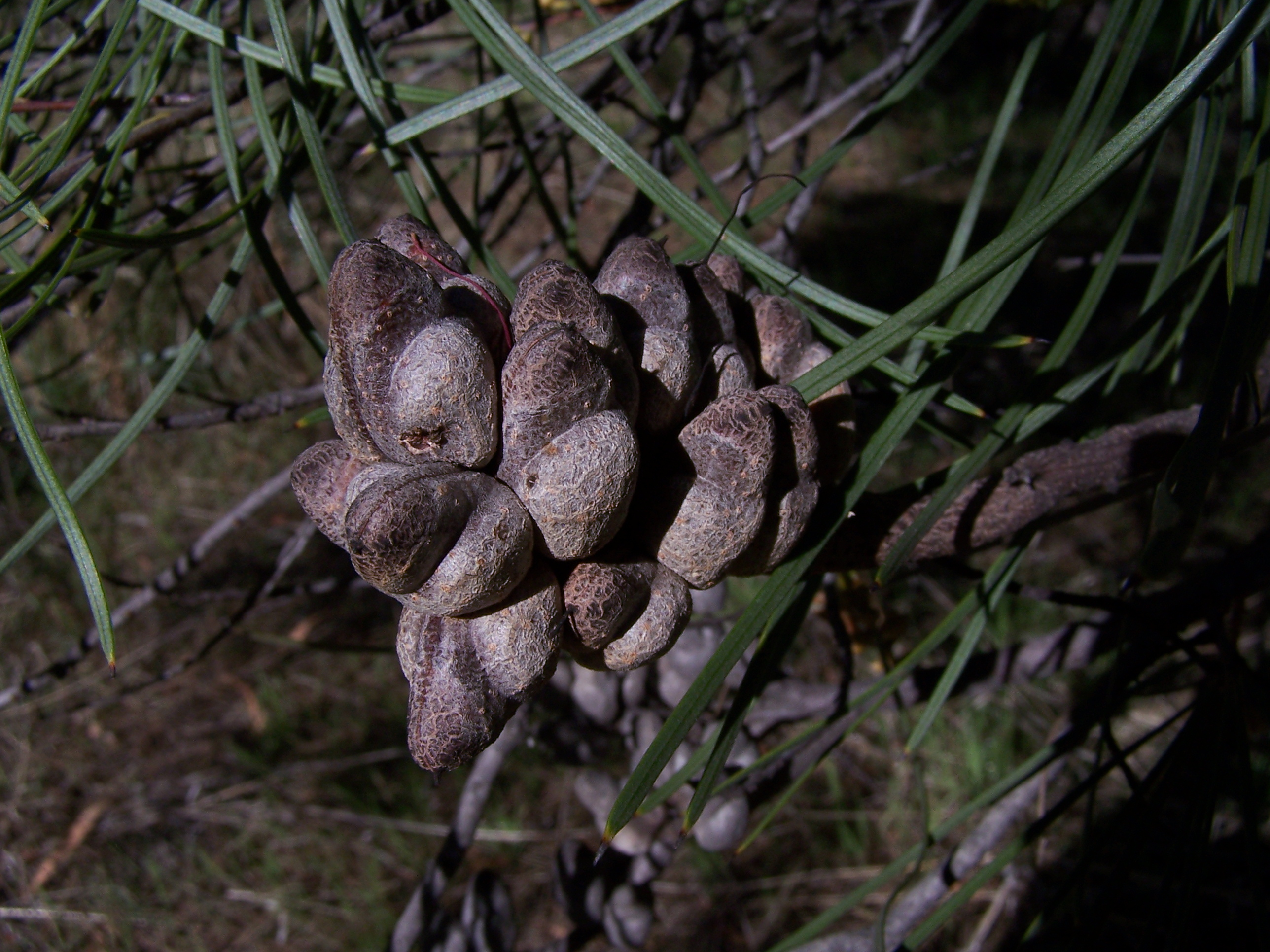
Woody seed pods

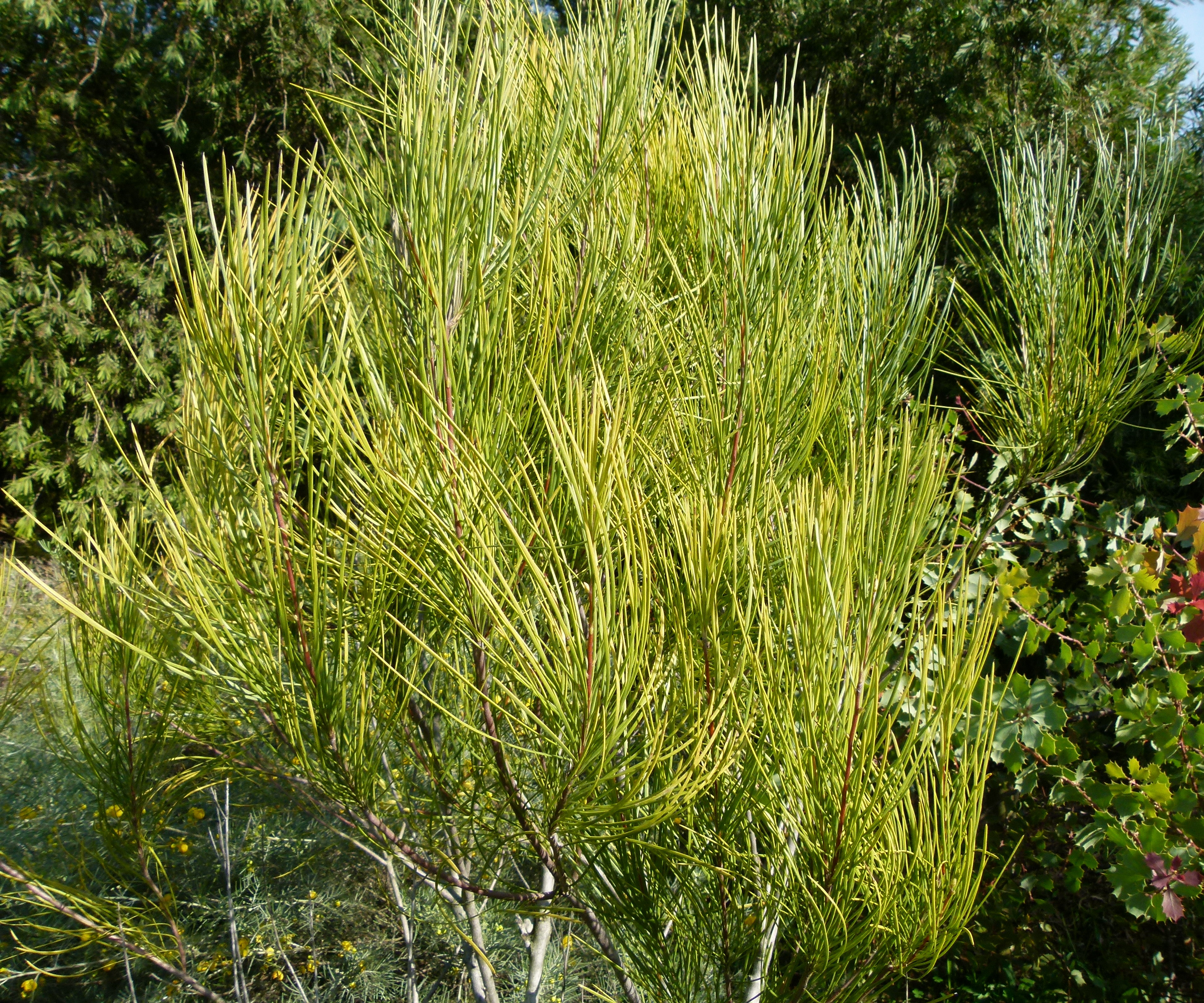
Habit

Hakea bucculenta, commonly known as red pokers, is a large shrub in the family Proteaceae endemic to Western Australia. It is an ornamental shrub with red or orange flowers that appear in rod-like blooms in leaf axils for an extended period from May to November.

== Description ==
Hakea bucculenta is non-lignotuberous upright, rounded, bushy shrub that typically grows to a height of 1.5 to 4.5 metres (5 to 15 ft) but can reach as high as 7 m (23 ft). Smaller branches have irregular patches of flattened silky hairs becoming smooth at flowering. The leaves are a narrowly linear shape with a slight curve and 90 to 200 millimetres (4 to 8 in) long and 1 to 3 millimetres (0.039 to 0.118 in) wide. Each leaf has fine ribbing, conspicuous veins with an obvious mid-vein on both sides and ending with a sharp point. Each inflorescence is made up of 250 to 450 showy orange or bright red flowers in racemes up to 15 cm (6 in) long on a smooth stem 8.5–13.5 cm (3–5 in) long. Flowers appear from May to November, the main flush in spring. The pedicel is smooth and perianth a bright red. The style 18–21 mm (0.7–0.8 in) long. The woody fruit are egg-shaped 1.7–2.5 cm (0.7–1 in) long and 1–1.5 cm (0.4–0.6 in) wide. The grey smooth fruit appear in clusters of 3–16 on a long stem or attached directly onto the branch. Each fruit is divided into a thick body ending a blunt beak. The blackish or brown seeds are obliquely obovate with a length of 16 to 18 mm (0.63 to 0.71 in) and a width of 7 to 9 mm (0.28 to 0.35 in) with a single wing.

== Taxonomy ==
Hakea bucculenta was first formally described by the botanist Charles Austin Gardner in 1936 and published in the Journal of the Royal Society of Western Australia. The specific epithet (bucculenta) is derived from the Latin word bucculentus meaning "with full cheeks", which refers to the shape of the fruit.

== Distribution ==
Hakea bucculenta is endemic to coastal areas in the Gascoyne and Mid West regions between Shark Bay and Geraldton in Western Australia. It grows on coastal sand plain heath or mallee, roadsides verges in sandy, loam or clay-based soils.

== Conservation status ==
Hakea bucculenta is listed as Near Threatened on the IUCN Red List of Threatened Species due to its limited distribution and its suspected population decline of approximately 25% over the past three generations.

Historical habitat clearing for agriculture, mainly in the 1960s has caused a suspected population decline of approximately 25% over the past three generations, with each generational length being 20–30 years. Current threats such as drought associated with climate change, additional habitat clearance and disturbance in populations on road verges from weed invasion and the use of phosphate fertilizers in farming has meant that the overall population of the species is in decline. However, this decline is not deemed severe enough to warrant a higher threat category. Its population is not deemed as severely fragmented, and it is known from multiple locations.

Some subpopulations of Hakea bucculenta are present in protected areas such as Kalbarri National Park, and multiple nature reserves, however many others are confined to remnant habitat along roads, where they are most susceptible to disturbance. Additional conservation measures in these areas, such as monitoring populations and mitigating threats are needed to further conserve the species.

== Use in horticulture ==
Hakea bucculenta is sensitive to dieback and thus difficult to keep alive in areas of high humidity. It can be successfully grafted onto Hakea salicifolia and it may hybridise with H. francisiana. It is most commonly propagated from seeds which germinate in about three to four weeks. Cuttings can also be used but usually have a low rate of success. It grows well in a sunny position out of the wind in well-drained soils and it will tolerate both drought and frost.
