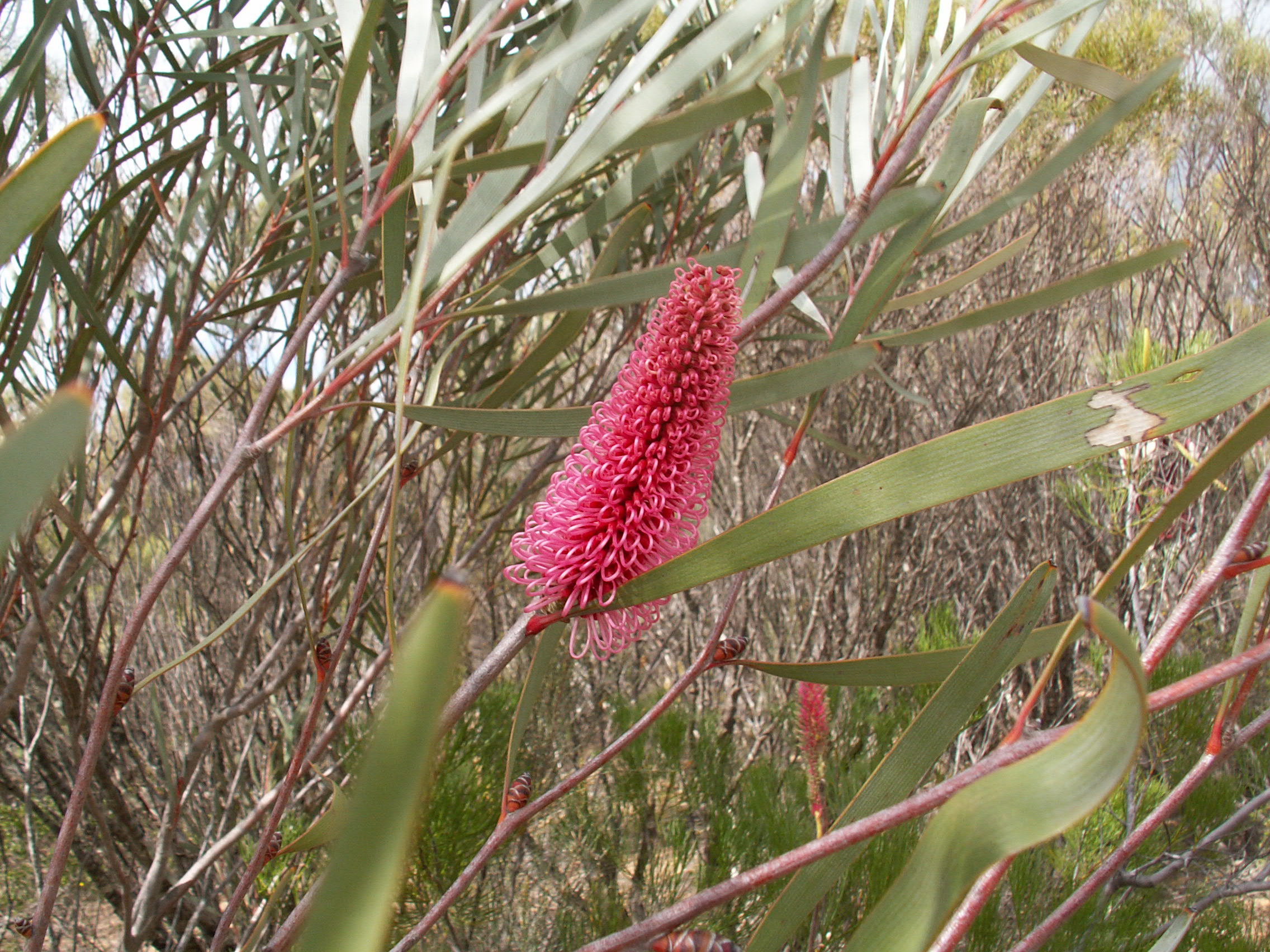

Scientific classification
- Kingdom: Plantae
- Clade: Tracheophytes
- Clade: Angiosperms
- Clade: Eudicots
- Order: Proteales
- Family: Proteaceae
- Genus: Hakea
- Species: H. francisiana

Binomial name
- Hakea francisiana F.Muell.
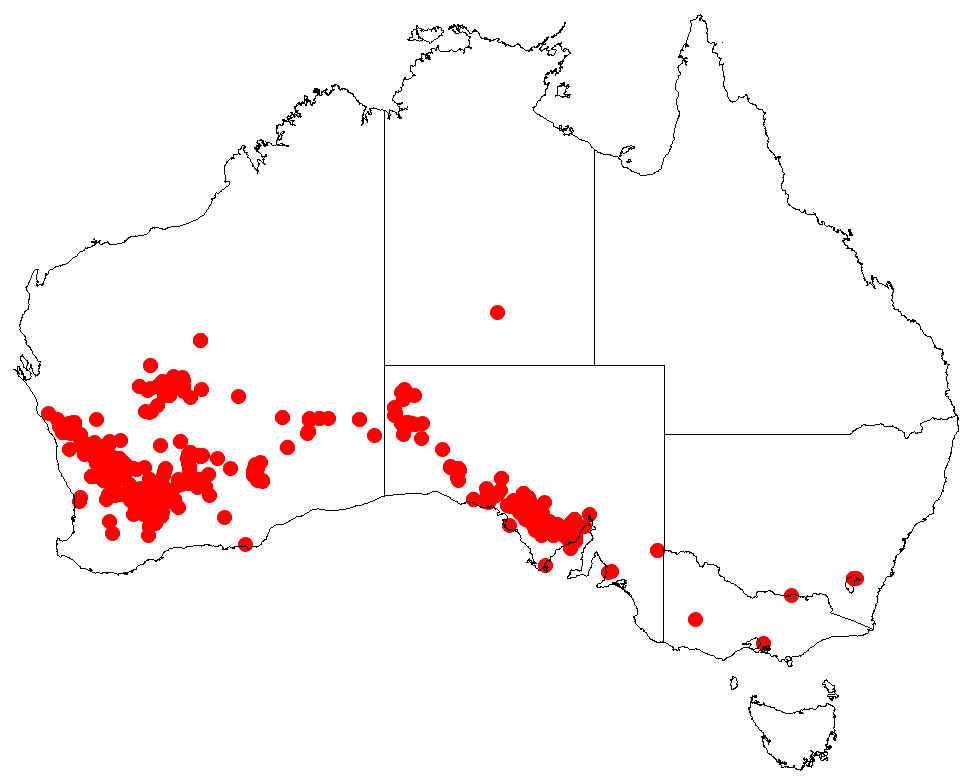
- Occurrence data from AVH

= Hakea francisiana =

Emu tree

Species of plant native to Western Australia and South Australia

Hakea francisiana, commonly called the emu tree, grass-leaf hakea or bottlebrush hakea, is a shrub or tree of the genus Hakea native to Western Australia and South Australia.

== Description ==
The non-lignotuberous shrub or tree with an open habit typically grows to a height of 3 to 8 metres (9.8 to 26.2 ft) and has a v-shaped canopy and rough bark. The evergreen linear leaves are up to a length of 15 centimetres (5.9 in) and a width of around 3 millimetres (0.118 in). It blooms from July to October and produces pink-red flowers. The flowers appear in large racemes that can be as large as 10 centimetres (3.9 in) in length. The flowers occur in the leaf axils during winter and spring. The colour of the flowers is red or reddish purple but the type that was once known as H. coriacea is mostly cream flowered with a pink middle. After flowering woody seed pods form that are around 20 mm (0.79 in) in length which hold two winged seeds. The pods will shed the seeds in particular conditions such as following a bushfire. It is very similar to Hakea bucculenta and Hakea multilineata.

== Taxonomy ==
The species was first formally described by the botanist Ferdinand von Mueller in 1858 as part of the work Fragmenta Phytographiae Australiae. The only synonyms are Hakea grammatophylla, Hakea coriacea, Hakea multilineata, Hakea multilineata var. graminea and Hakea multilineata var. grammatophylla.

The specific epithet honours George William Francis, who was the first director of the Adelaide Botanic Garden, from 1857 to 1865.

== Distribution ==
It is endemic to an area in the Wheatbelt, Mid West and Goldfields–Esperance regions of Western Australia from Geraldton in the west to Wiluna in the north to Lake Grace in the south and the Great Victoria Desert in the east extending into western parts of South Australia where it is found on sand-plains growing in sandy-clay, loam or clay soils often with gravel and quartz present. It is usually part of mallee woodland and shrubland communities.

== Cultivation ==
It requires a full sun position and needs minimal watering. It is useful as an ornamental or as habitat for birds and bees. The plant is tolerant of drought, lime and moderate to light frost. It is sometimes grafted onto hardier rootstock.
