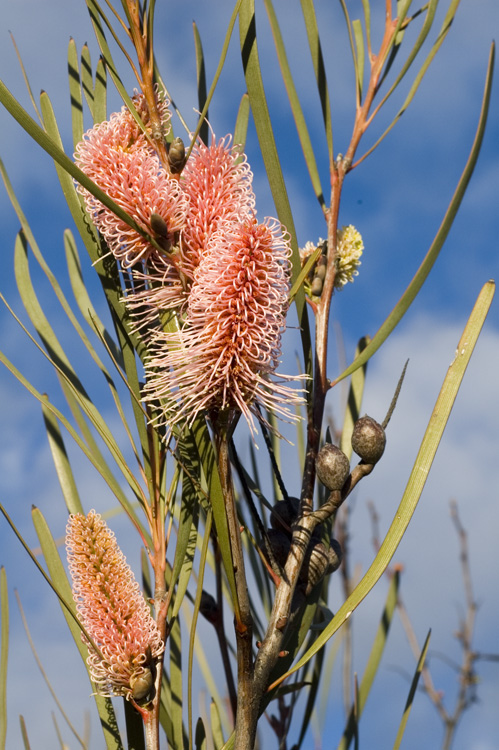
- Hakea multilineata growing near Lake King

Scientific classification
- Kingdom: Plantae
- Clade: Tracheophytes
- Clade: Angiosperms
- Clade: Eudicots
- Order: Proteales
- Family: Proteaceae
- Genus: Hakea
- Species: H. multilineata

Binomial name
- Hakea multilineata Meisn.
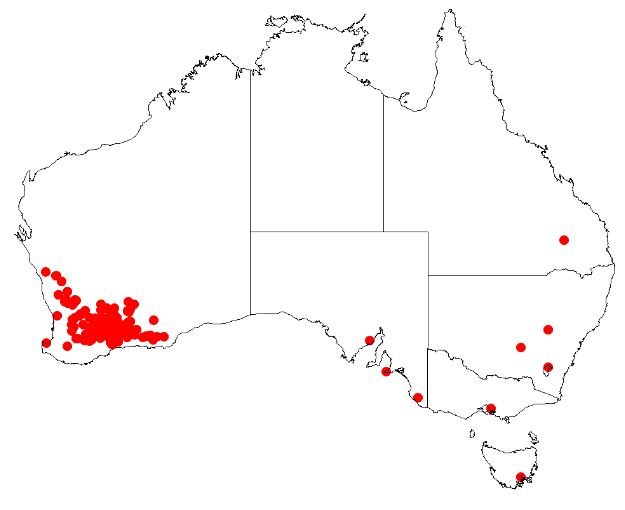
- Occurrence data from AVH

= Hakea multilineata =

Grass-leaf hakea

Species of shrub endemic to Western Australia

Hakea multilineata, commonly known as grass-leaved hakea, is a shrub in the family Proteaceae. It is endemic to an area in the Wheatbelt and Goldfields–Esperance regions of Western Australia. It has pink to red long racemes in upper leaf axils and leathery linear leaves.

== Description ==
Hakea multilineata is an upright shrub that typically grows to a height of 1.5 to 6 metres (5 to 20 ft) and does not form a lignotuber. Flowering occurs from June to September producing vibrant pink flowers, which are known for attracting local birds. This plant is also evergreen, retaining its leaves all year round providing an excellent addition to backyards and gardens. The mid-green leaves are flat, broad and linear, 10–20 cm (4–8 in) long to 1.5 cm (0.6 in) wide with visible longitudinal veins ending in a rounded tip. The smooth fruit are ovoid in shape tapering to a small beak. They may be found in clusters or spaced along the branchlets. Hakea multilineata is tolerant of medium frosts and grows best in an open sunny position that is very well drained.

== Taxonomy and naming ==
The species was first formally described by Swiss botanist Carl Meisner in 1848 and the description was published in Plantae Preissianae. Its name is said to be derived from the Latin multus 'many', and linea 'fine, parallel lines', referring to the veins in the leaf. The classical Latin linea is not a plural, but a singular, meaning "line".

== Distribution and habitat ==
Grass-leaved hakea grows from Dalwallinu and south to Ravensthorpe and east to the Shire of Yilgarn in scrubland or low woodland on laterite ridges or sandy to gravelly loams. An ornamental species and spectacular in bloom, attracting nectar-loving birds.

== Conservation status ==
Hakea multilineata is classified as "not threatened" by the Western Australian Government.
