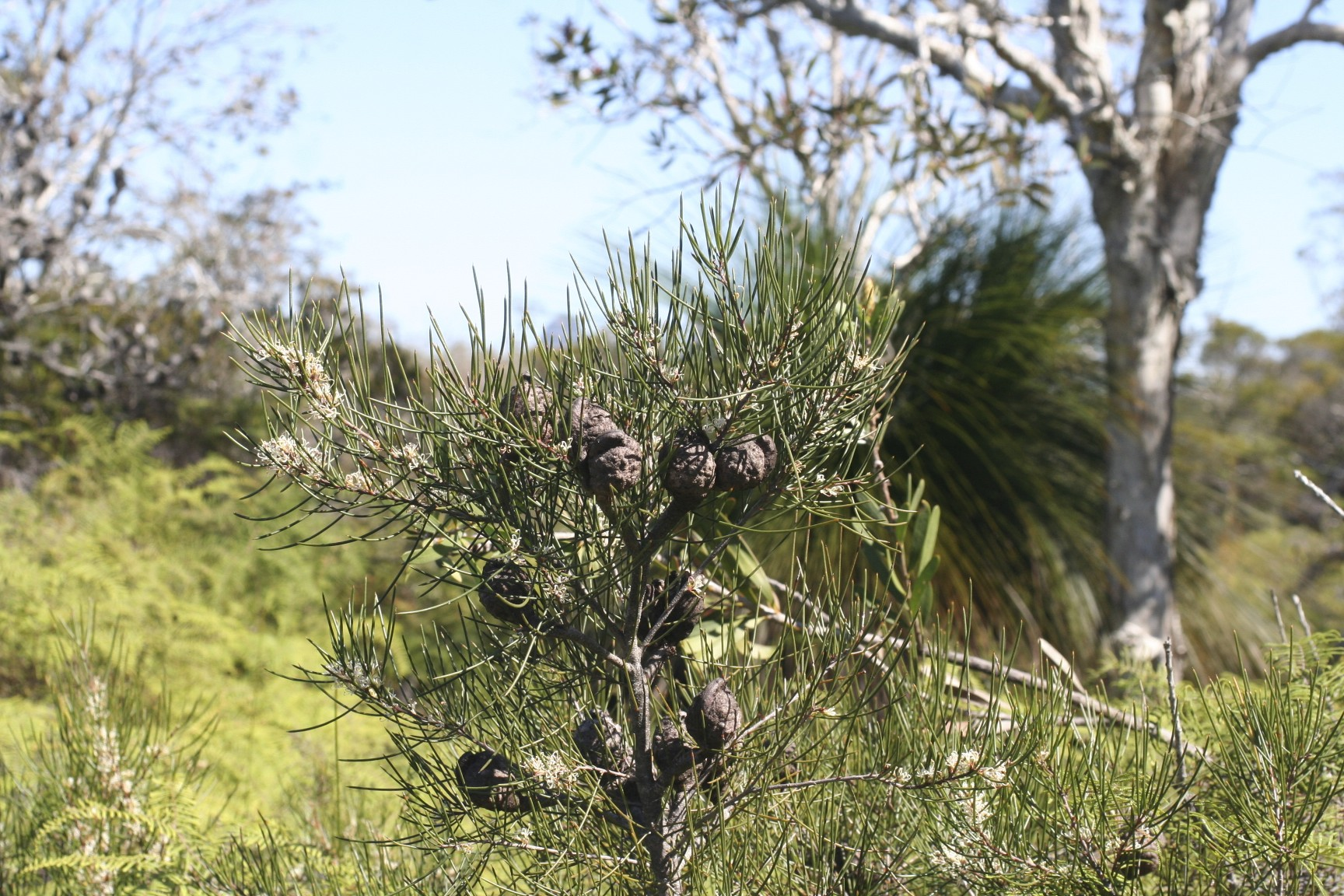

Scientific classification
- Kingdom: Plantae
- Clade: Tracheophytes
- Clade: Angiosperms
- Clade: Eudicots
- Order: Proteales
- Family: Proteaceae
- Genus: Hakea
- Species: H. actites

Binomial name
- Hakea actites W.R.Barker
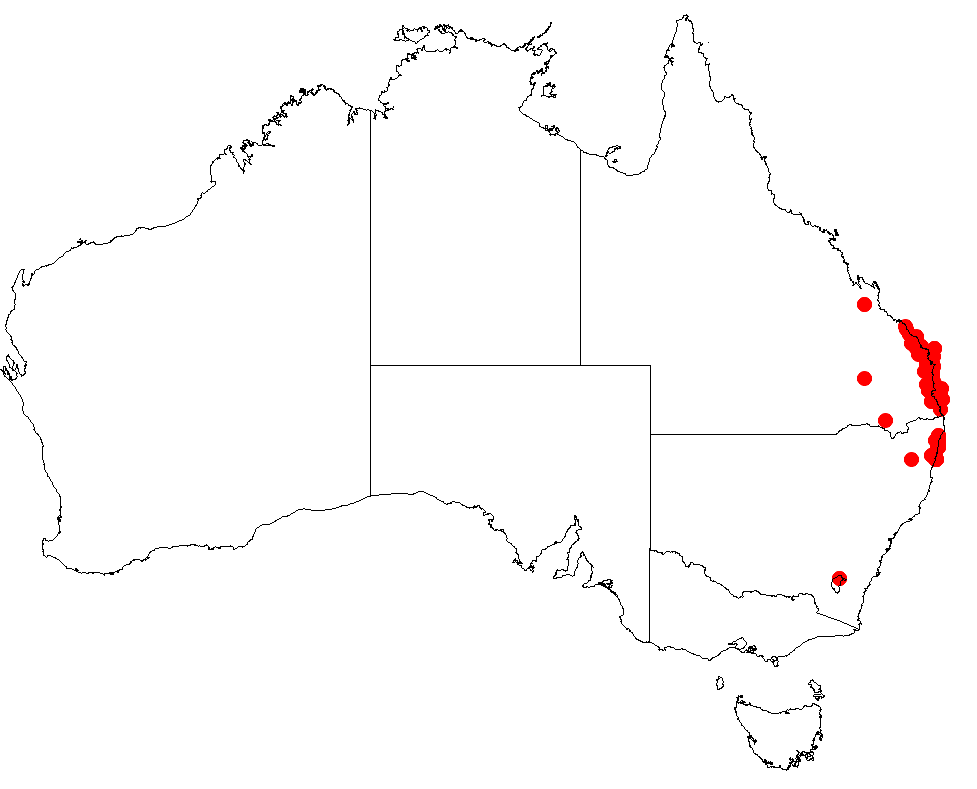
- Occurrence data from the Australasian Virtual Herbarium

= Hakea actites =

Species of plant native to Australia

Hakea actites, commonly known as the mulloway needle bush or wallum hakea is a shrub or tree of the Proteaceae family native to areas in north eastern New South Wales and south eastern Queensland. White nectar-rich flowers appear in abundance from late autumn to early spring.

== Description ==
Hakea actites is a prickly shrub or tree growing to 0.3 to 5 metres (1.0 to 16.4 ft) high and forms a lignotuber. Smaller branches are silky to densely covered with short matted hairs. The light green leaves are smooth, needle-like 3.5 to 13.5 centimetres (1.4 to 5.3 in) long and 0.3 to 1.3 millimetres (0.0 to 0.1 in) in diameter ending with a sharp point 1–2 mm (0.04–0.08 in) long. The inflorescence consists of 1-6 white flowers appearing in clusters in leaf axils. Flower stalks are 0.6–1 mm (0.02–0.04 in) long covered in short rusty coloured matted hairs. The pedicel is 1.8–3 mm (0.07–0.1 in) long covered sparsely or with matted silky white and rusty coloured hairs. Perianth 3.1–4.3 mm (0.1–0.2 in) long, white and smooth, occasionally a bluish-green with a powdery film. The wrinkled egg-shaped fruit are 20–35 mm (0.8–1 in) long and 16–25 mm (0.6–1 in) wide ending with a smooth rounded beak and obscure horns. Occasionally, fruits appear with coarse blister-like protuberances. Flowers appear from May to September. Hakea actites resembles the better known Hakea sericea.

== Taxonomy and naming ==
Hakea actites was first formally described by botanist William Barker in 1996 and the description was published in the Journal of the Adelaide Botanic Garden. The type specimen was collected from near Angourie on the North Coast of New South Wales. The specific epithet is derived from the Ancient Greek word (aktites) meaning "shore dweller" referring to the coastal regions where the species is found. Mulloway needle bush is part of the Sericea group, a mostly eastern states group with simple terete leaves, inflorescences containing few flowers, hairy pedicels and single woody fruits. Other members of the group include Hakea constablei, Hakea decurrens, Hakea gibbosa, Hakea lissosperma, Hakea macraeana, Hakea sericea and Hakea tephrosperma among others.

== Distribution and habitat ==
Hakea actites is found in swampy locations in coastal areas from around Hervey Bay in south-eastern Queensland in the north to a little north of Coffs Harbour in New South Wales in the south. It grows well in damp sand to sandy clay soils and is often part of open wallum heathland and Eucalyptus forest communities.

== Uses in horticulture ==
A very hardy species that may be grown from seed and suited to coastal swampy situations. Provides protection, nesting sites and nectar for small birds due to its prickly habit and profuse flowering.
