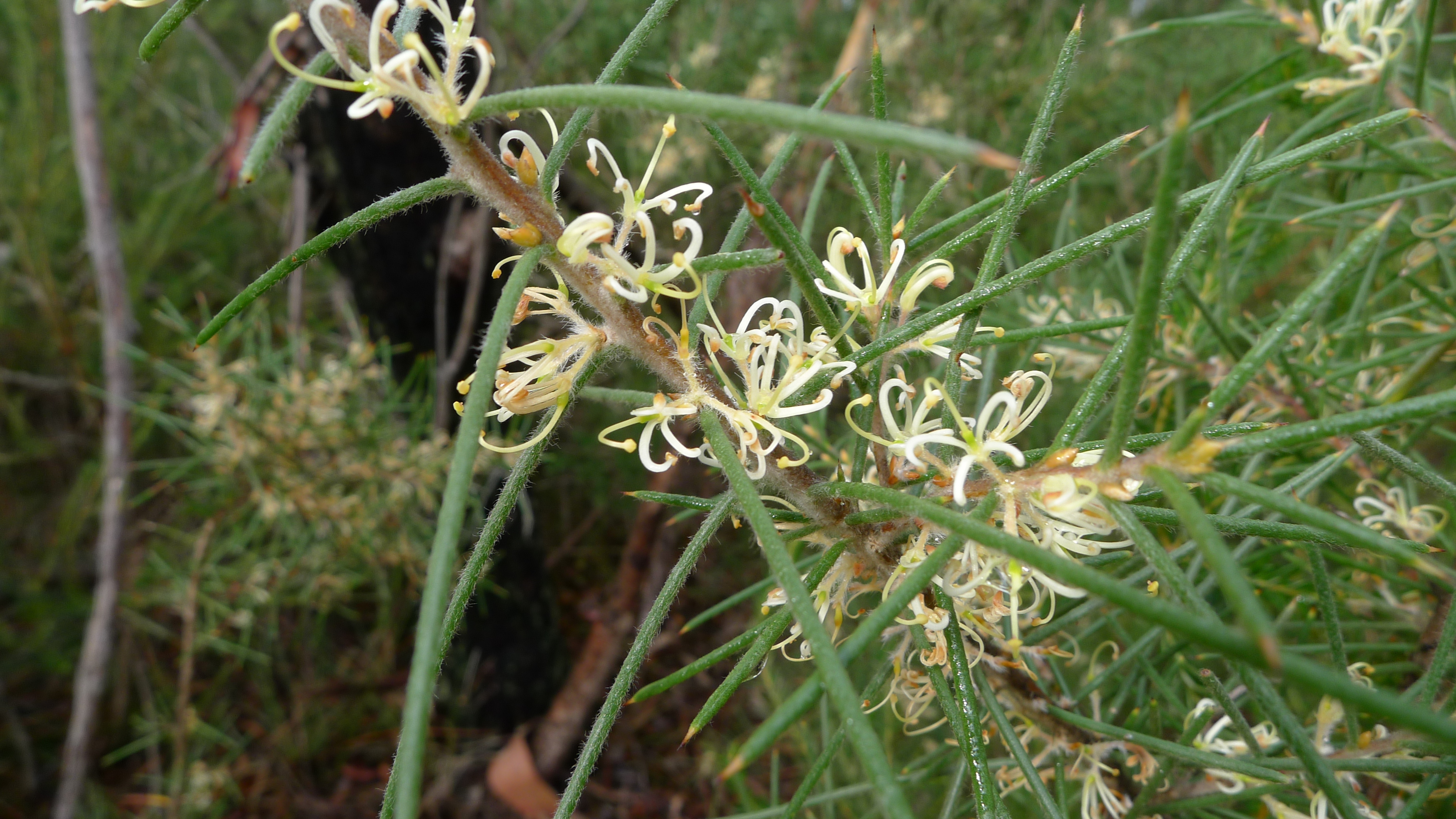

Scientific classification
- Kingdom: Plantae
- Clade: Tracheophytes
- Clade: Angiosperms
- Clade: Eudicots
- Order: Proteales
- Family: Proteaceae
- Genus: Hakea
- Species: H. gibbosa

Binomial name
- Hakea gibbosa (Sm.) Cav.
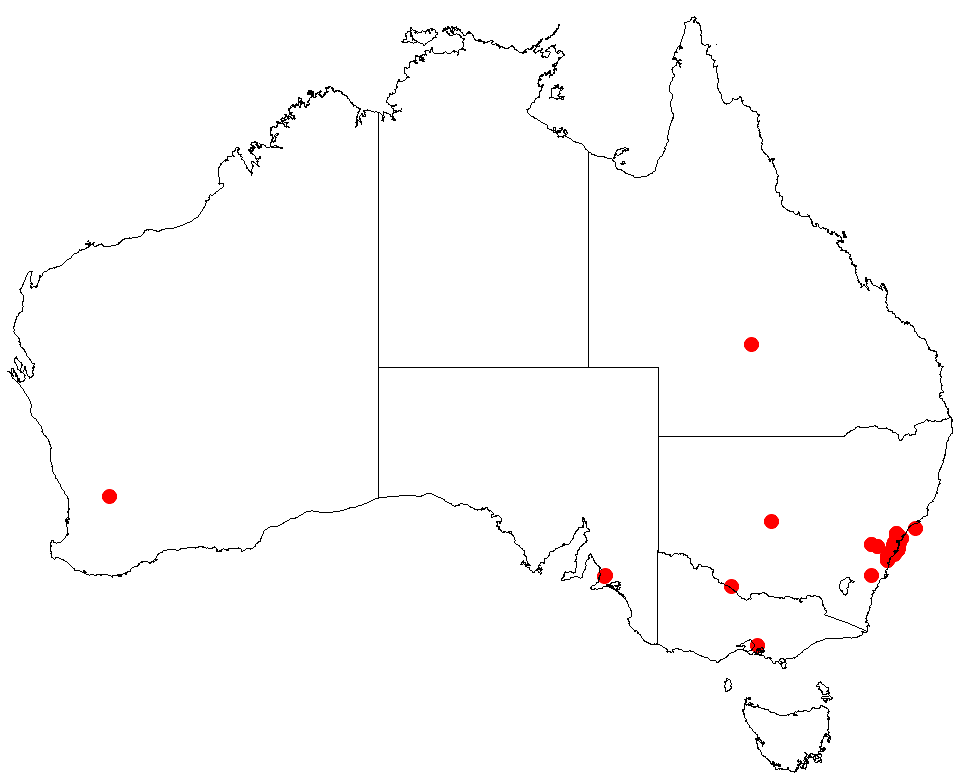
- Occurrence data from AVH

Synonyms
- Banksia gibbosa Sm. Conchium gibbosum (Sm.) Donn ex Sm. Hakea lanigera Ten. Hakea tamminensis C.A.Gardner

= Hakea gibbosa =

Hairy hakea

Species of shrub endemic to Australia

Hakea gibbosa, commonly known as hairy hakea or needlebush hakea, is a shrub of the family Proteaceae, and is endemic to south eastern Australia. It has very prickly foliage, cream-yellowish flowers from April to July, and provides shelter for small birds. It has become an environmental weed in South Africa and New Zealand, where it had been introduced for use as a hedge plant.

== Description ==
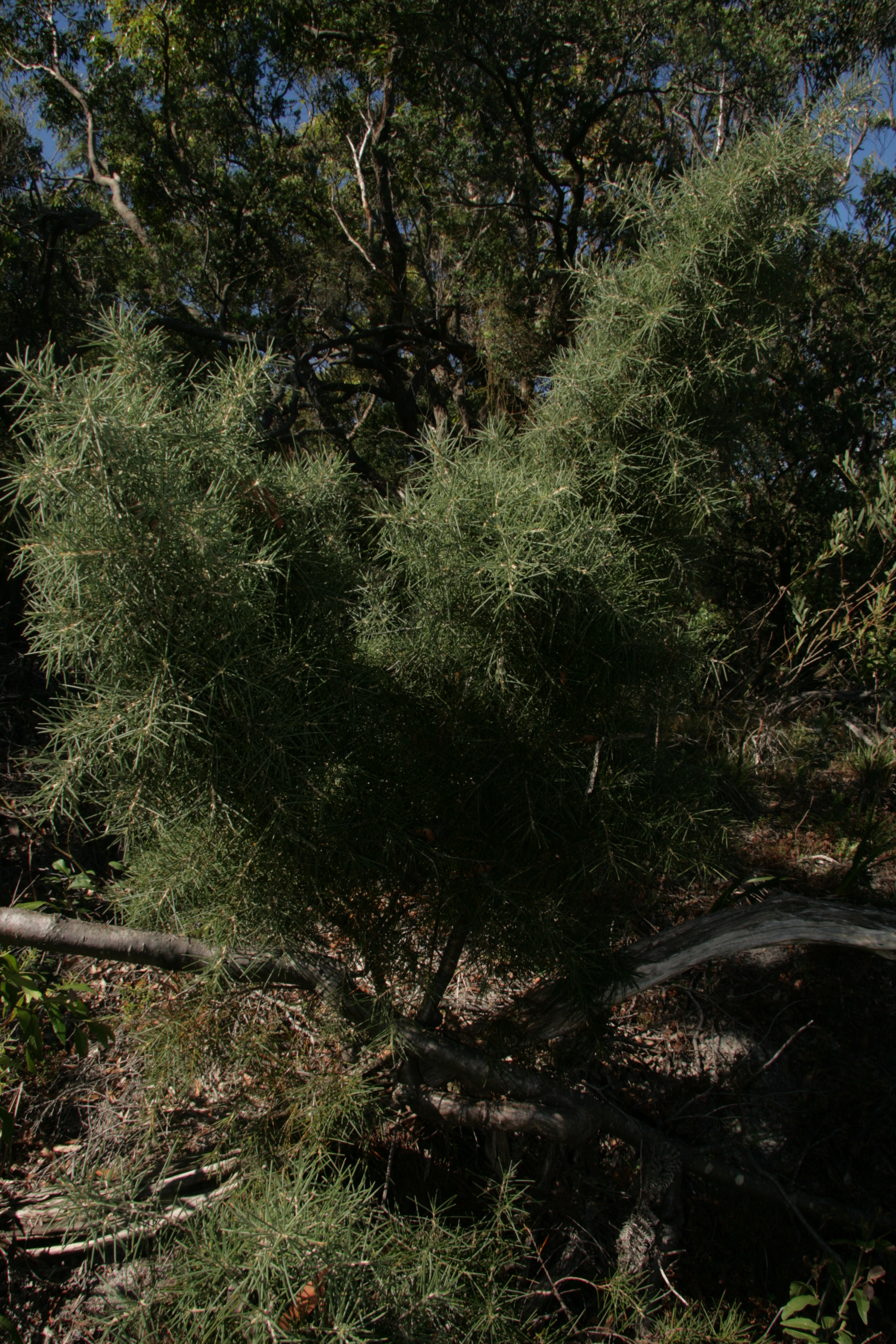
Dense prickly habit, Botany Bay National Park

Hakea gibbosa is a very prickly shrub to 0.9–3 m (2 ft 11 in – 9 ft 10 in) high. It may be bushy or slender, and does not form a lignotuber. The new growth and leaves are thickly covered with fine brown hairs, becoming smooth as they age. The leaves are needle-shaped, mostly grooved on the underside, 2.5–8.5 cm (0.98–3.35 in) long, 0.9–1.5 cm (0.35–0.59 in) wide, spreading in different directions, and tipped with a very sharp point 1–2.3 mm (0.039–0.091 in) long. The inflorescence consists of two to six individual cream-coloured flowers on a stem 0.7–1.6 mm (0.028–0.063 in) long in the leaf axils. The pedicels are 2–5 mm (0.079–0.197 in) long and covered with long, soft hairs. Flowering occurs from April to July. The perianth is 5–6 cm (2.0–2.4 in) long, white-yellow and usually smooth. The large grey, globular shaped fruits are woody, 2.5–4.5 cm (0.98–1.77 in) long and 2–3 cm (0.79–1.18 in) wide, with a deeply wrinkled or warty surface, a small beak and fragile horns about 0.3 mm (0.012 in) long. The fruits contain two seeds. and are retained on the shrub.

== Taxonomy ==
Hakea gibbosa was first collected at Botany Bay in April 1770, by Sir Joseph Banks and Daniel Solander, naturalists on the British vessel HMS Endeavour during Lieutenant (later Captain) James Cook's first voyage to the Pacific Ocean. Solander coined the (unpublished) binomial name Leucadendroides spinosissima in Banks' Florilegium. It was first formally described by James Edward Smith who named the species Banksia gibbosa in 1790. In 1800 the Spanish taxonomic botanist Antonio José Cavanilles gave it its current name. The British botanist Richard Anthony Salisbury had given it the name Banksia pinifolia in 1796, upon which Joseph Knight based his name and reallocated it to Hakea as the pine-leaved hakea (H. pinifolia) in his controversial 1809 work On the cultivation of the plants belonging to the natural order of Proteeae.

== Distribution and habitat ==
Needlebush hakea is restricted to the Sydney basin in central New South Wales, It is found on sandstone ridges and cliffs in heathland, with red bloodwood (Corymbia gummifera), tea tree (Leptospermum trinervium), dagger hakea (Hakea teretifolia), heath banksia (Banksia ericifolia), and conesticks (Petrophile pulchella).

Plants found in Queensland which were classified as this species have been renamed as a new species Hakea actites.

Hakea gibbosa is a Category 1 Plant on the Declared Weeds & Invaders list for South Africa. It has become naturalised in northern parts of North Island in New Zealand.

== Ecology ==
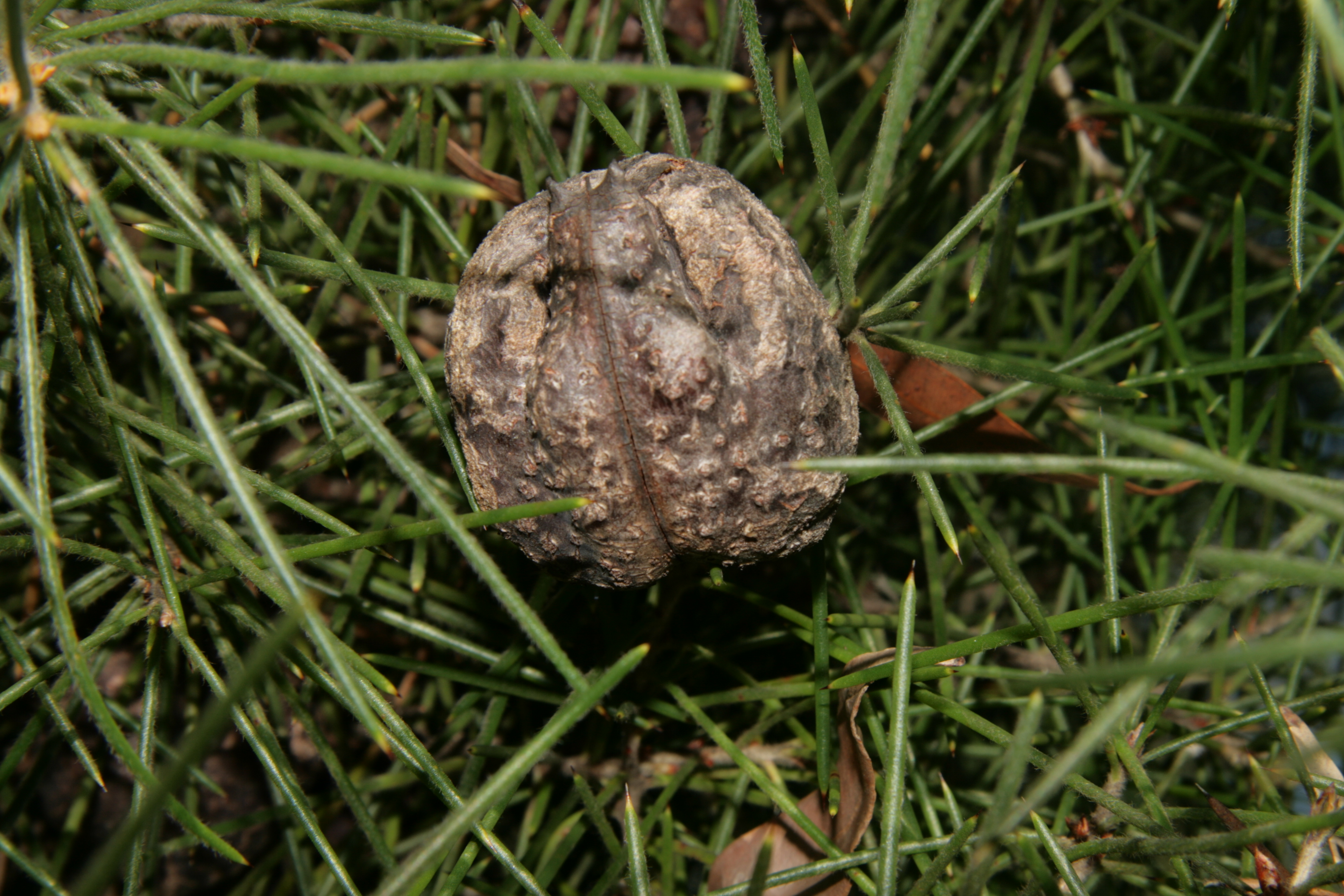
Woody follicle

Small birds use the prickly foliage as shelter. The seeds are eaten by the yellow-tailed black cockatoo.

== Cultivation ==
Hakea gibbosa adapts readily to cultivation and is easy to grow with good drainage and a sunny aspect, though its prickly foliage may be a deterrent.

The gum was investigated for use in sustained-release tablets in 1999.
