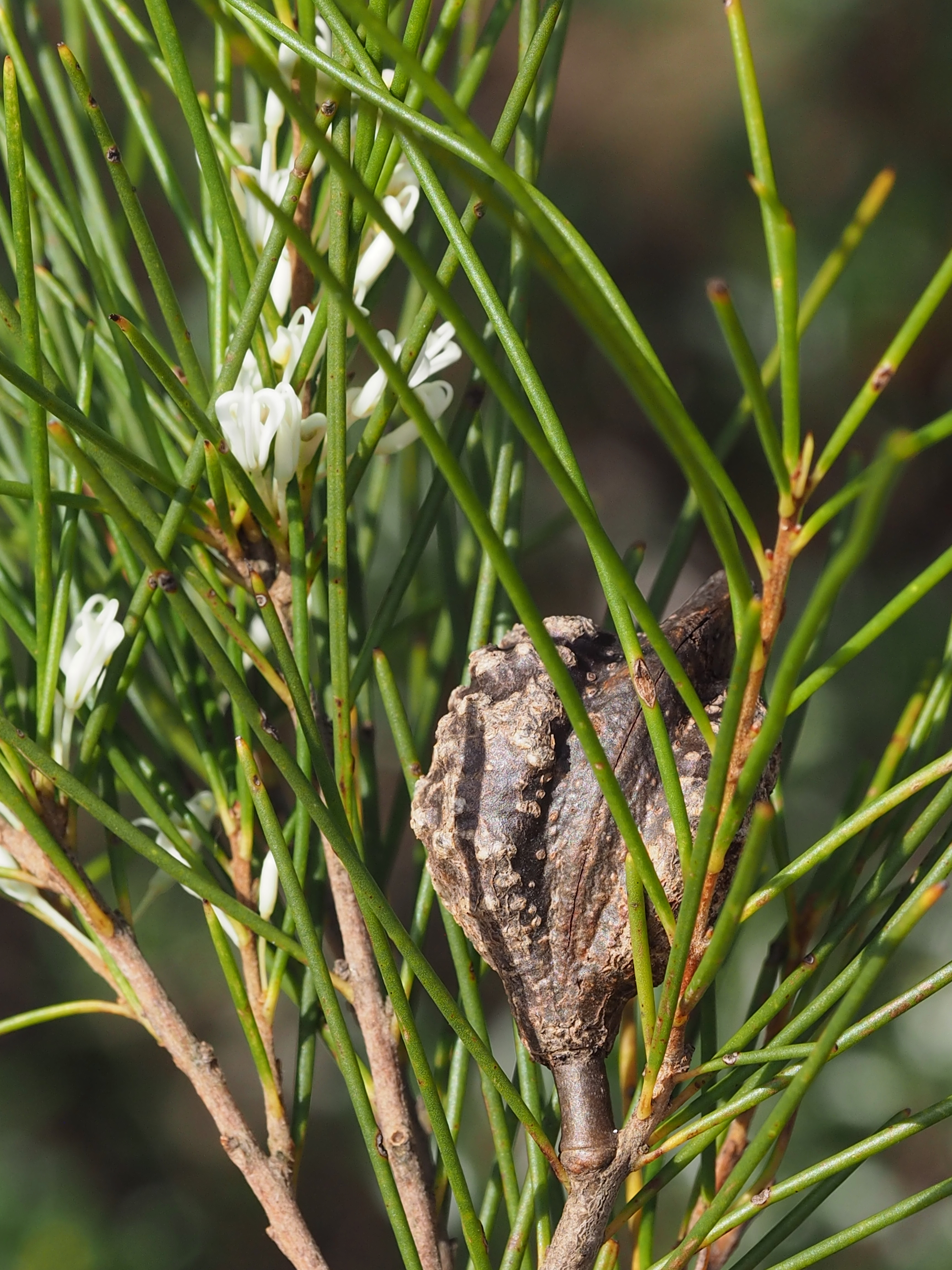

Scientific classification
- Kingdom: Plantae
- Clade: Tracheophytes
- Clade: Angiosperms
- Clade: Eudicots
- Order: Proteales
- Family: Proteaceae
- Genus: Hakea
- Species: H. ochroptera

Binomial name
- Hakea ochroptera W.R.Barker
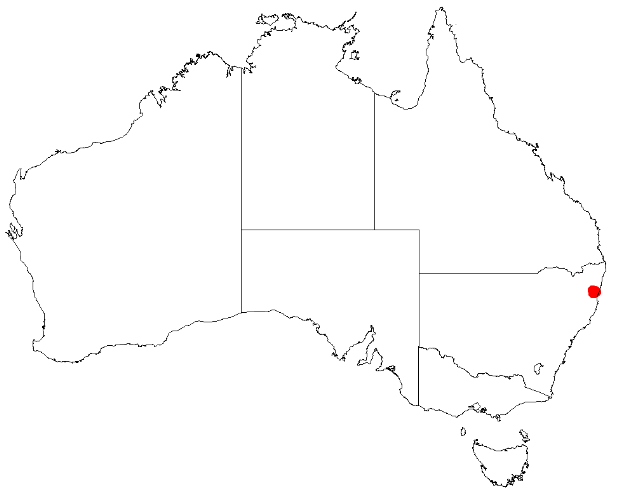
- Occurrence data from AVH

= Hakea ochroptera =

Species of shrub native to eastern Australia

Hakea ochroptera is a species of flowering plant in the family Proteaceae and is endemic to a restricted area of New South Wales, Australia. It is a shrub with long, needle-shaped leaves and an abundance of cream-white flowers in spring.

== Description ==
Hakea ochroptera is a tall shrub or tree to 12 m (40 ft) high with descending branches and does not form a lignotuber. Young stems, leaves and pedicels are hairy and rusty coloured. The leaves are needle-shaped, 50–135 mm (2.0–5.3 in) long and about 1 mm (0.039 in) wide ending with a point 1–2 mm (0.039–0.079 in) long. Creamy-white flowers appear in umbels of up to six flowers in the leaf axils from September to October. The fruit are 32–40 mm (1.3–1.6 in) long and 20–25 mm (0.79–0.98 in) wide with small blister-like growths on the surface ending with an obscure or absent horn.

== Taxonomy and naming ==
Hakea ochroptera was first formally described in 1996 by South Australian botanist William Barker and the description was published in the Journal of the Adelaide Botanic Gardens. The specific epithet (ochroptera) derives from the Greek, ochros, yellow, and pteron, wing, alluding to an important diagnostic difference from H. macraeana".

== Distribution and habitat ==
This hakea is found near Dorrigo in northern New South Wales where it grows in shallow soil on hillsides on rock in light scrub or depauperate warm-temperate rainforest.

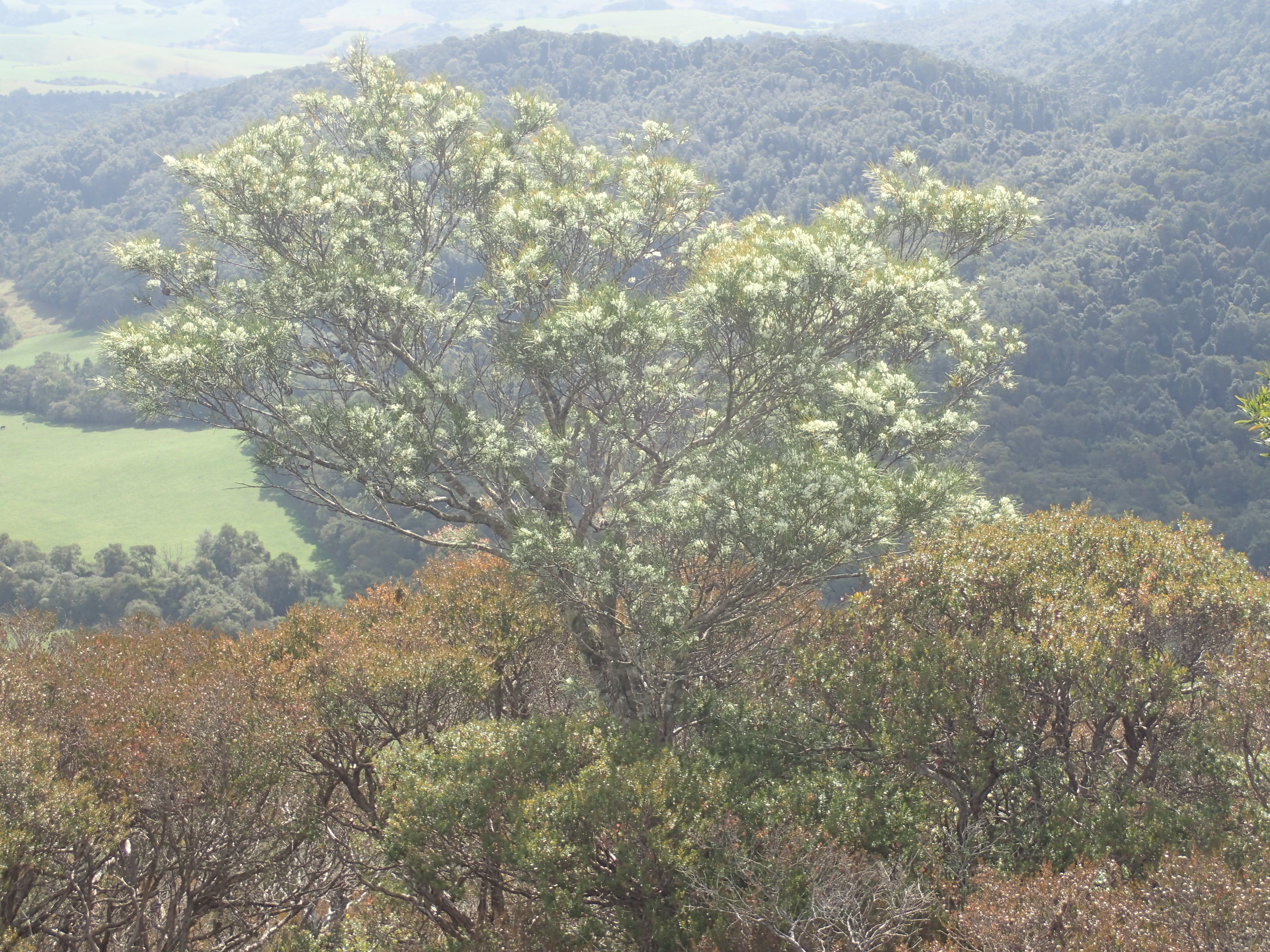
Habit on Dome Mountain in Dorrigo National Park

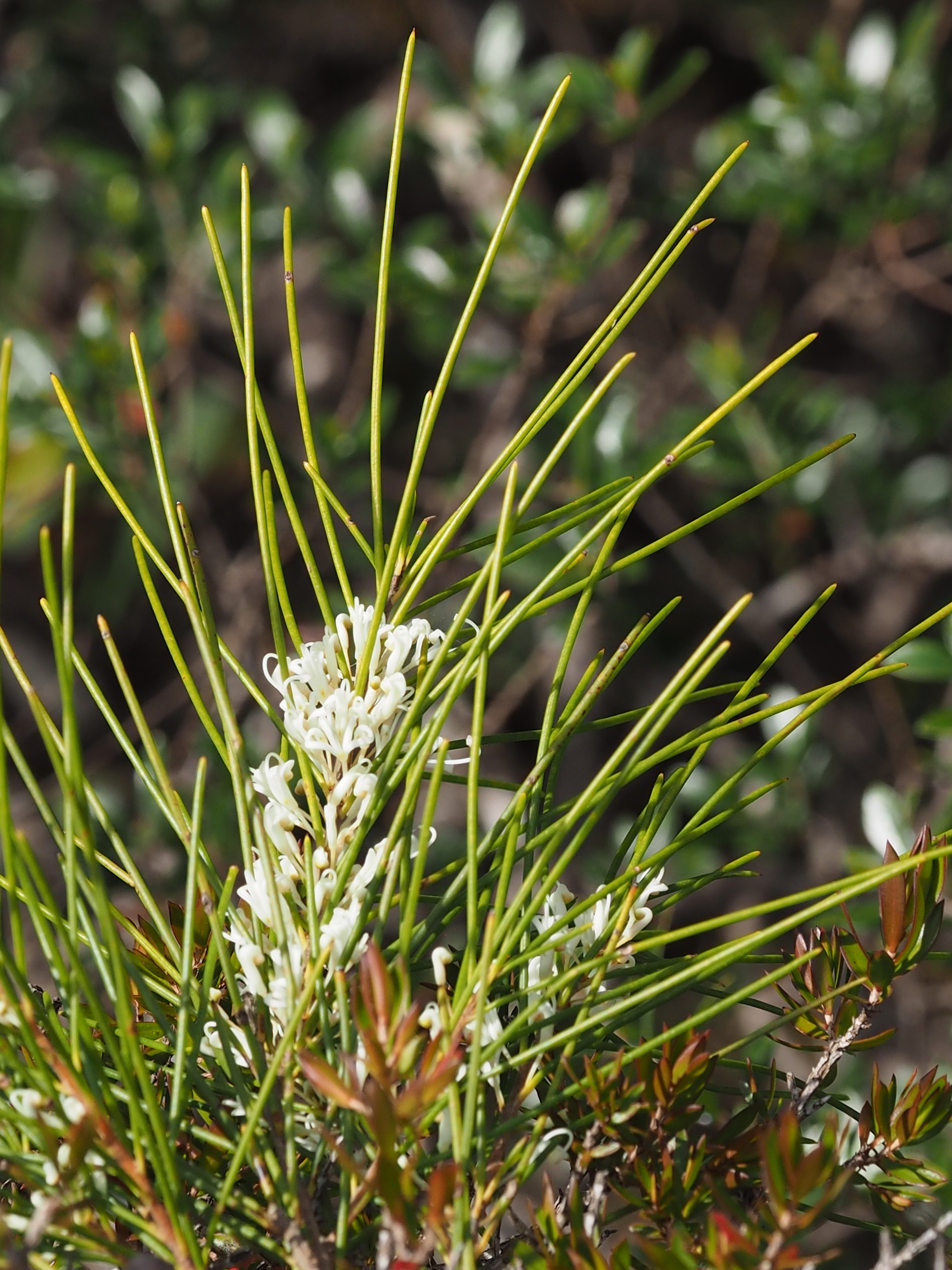
Flowers

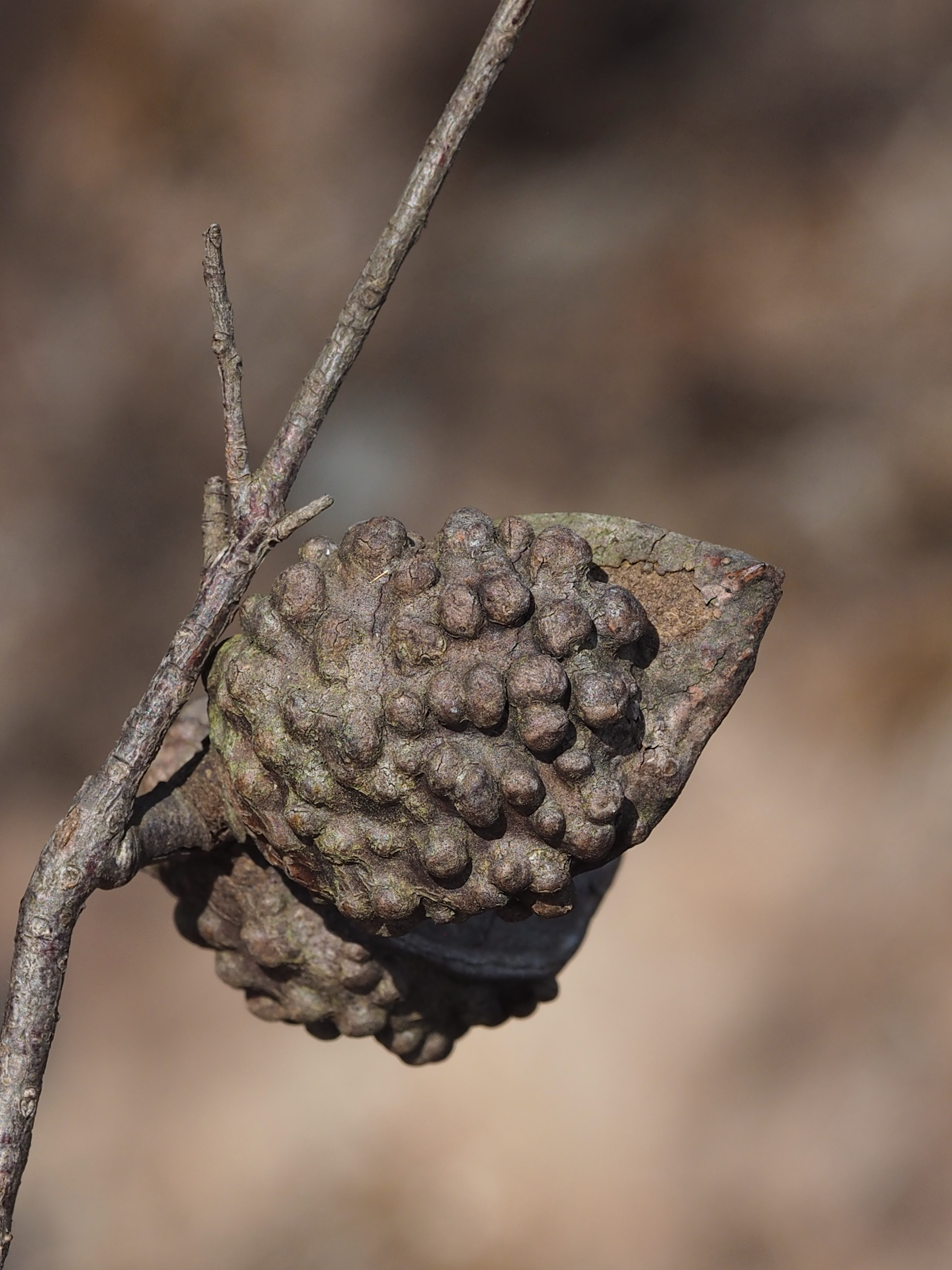
Old, opened fruit
