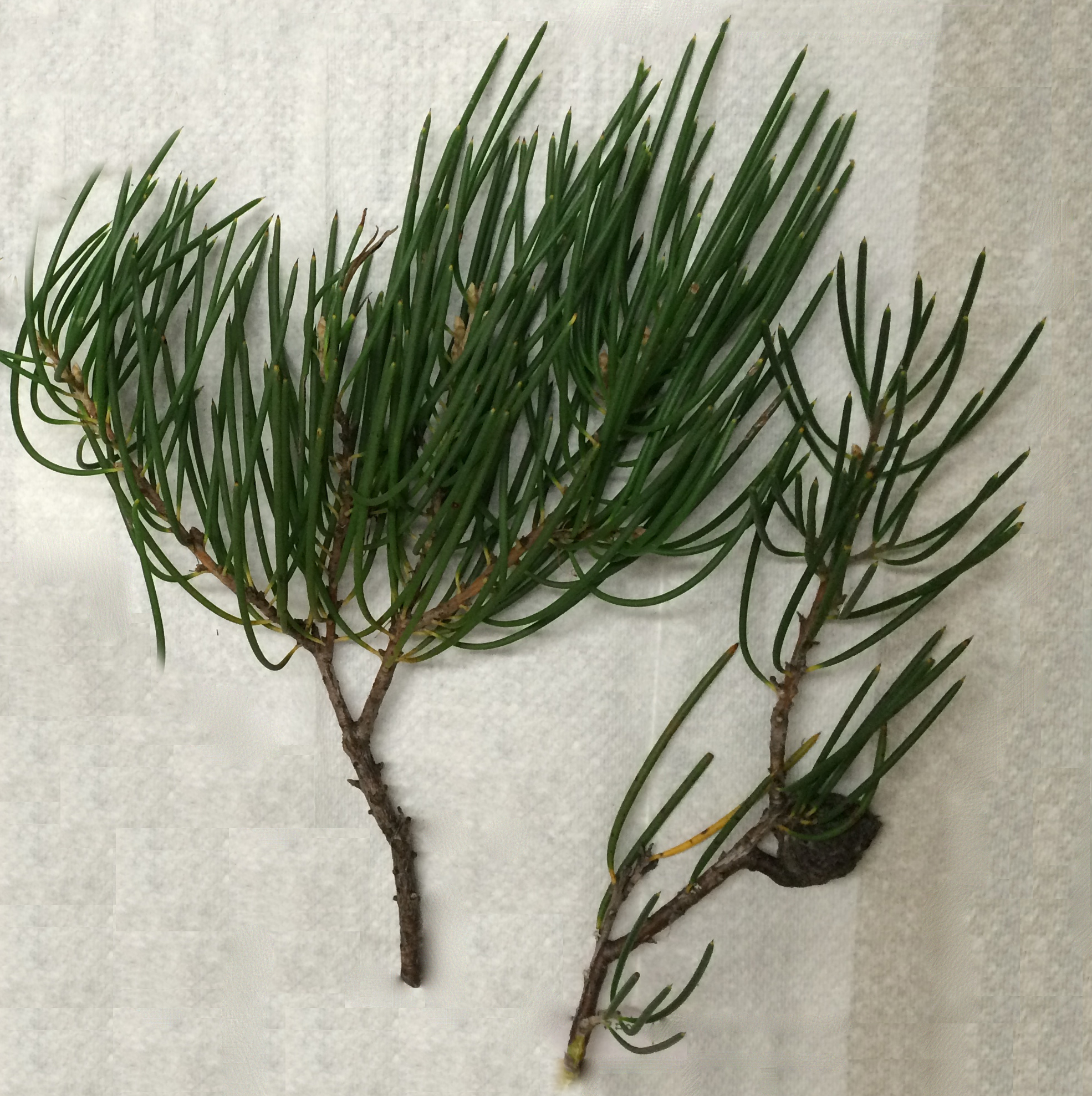

Scientific classification
- Kingdom: Plantae
- Clade: Tracheophytes
- Clade: Angiosperms
- Clade: Eudicots
- Order: Proteales
- Family: Proteaceae
- Genus: Hakea
- Species: H. lissosperma

Binomial name
- Hakea lissosperma R.Br.
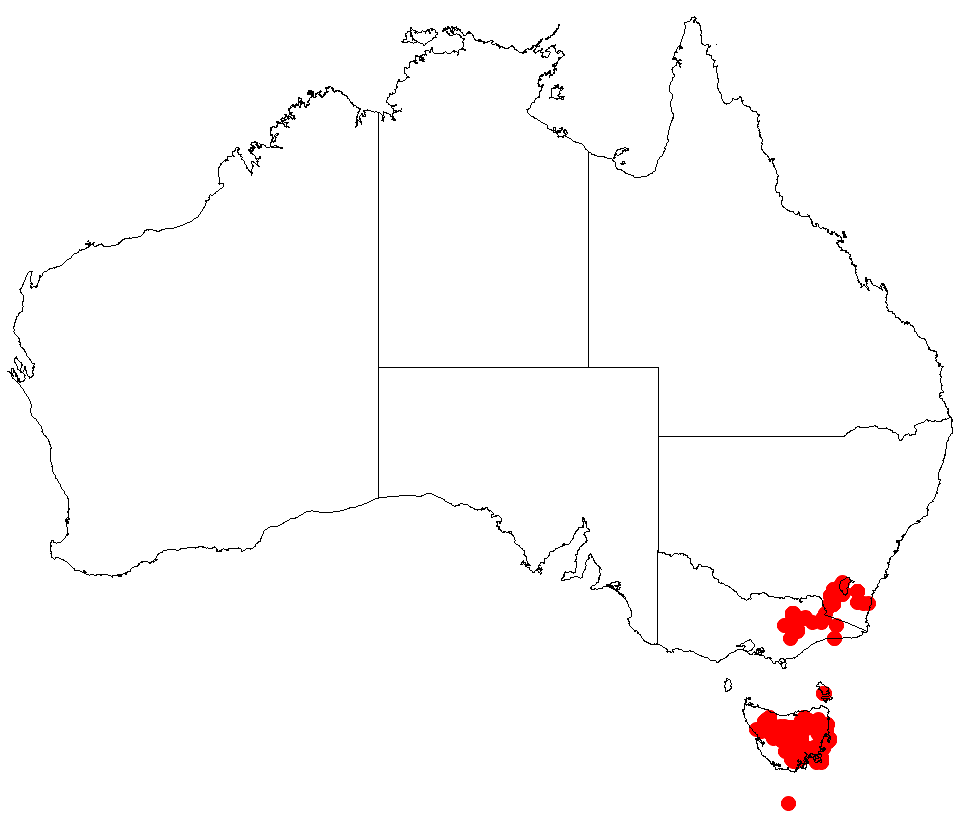
- Occurrence data from AVH

Synonyms
- Hakea acicularis var. lissosperma (R.Br.) Benth Fl. Austral; Hakea tenuifolia var. lissosperma (R.Br.) Domin Biblioth. Bot.; Hakea sericea var. lissosperma (R.Br.) Ewart Fl.Victoria

= Hakea lissosperma =

Mountain needlewood

Species of plant from south eastern Australia

Hakea lissosperma, commonly known as needle bush and mountain needlewood, is a species of Hakea native to parts of south eastern Australia.

== Description ==
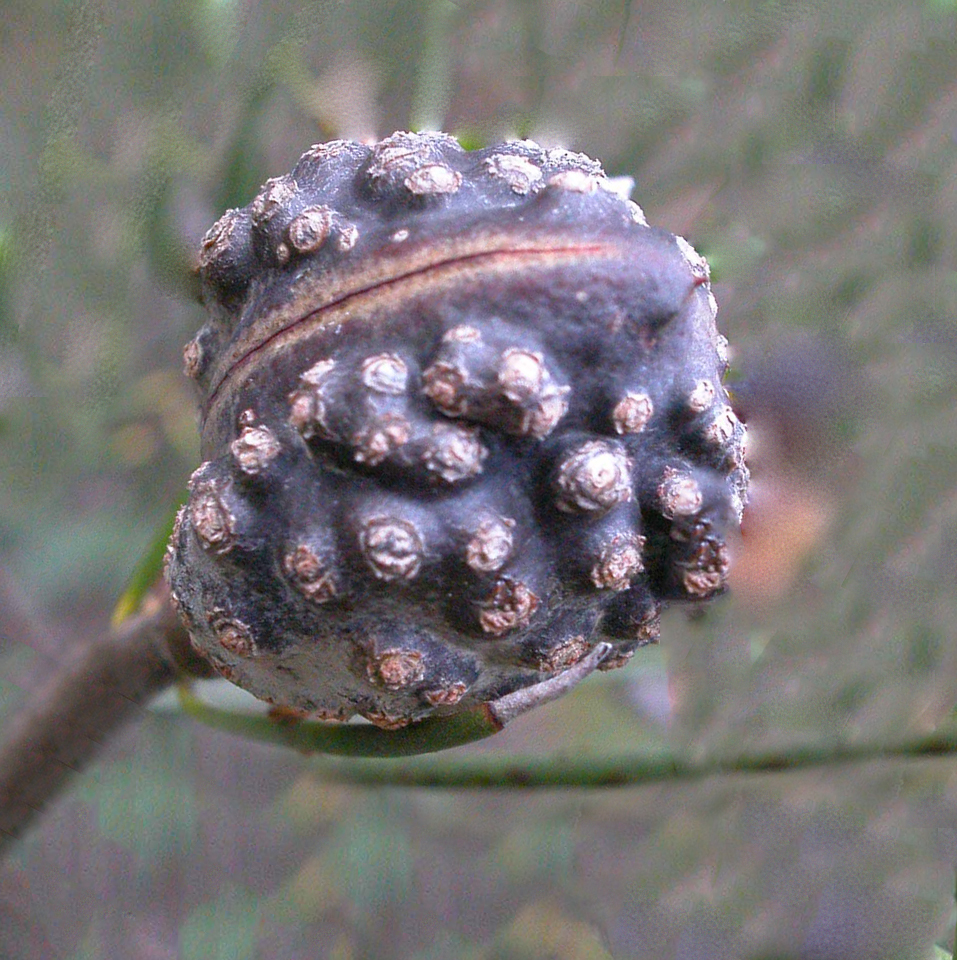
Fruit of Hakea lissosperma

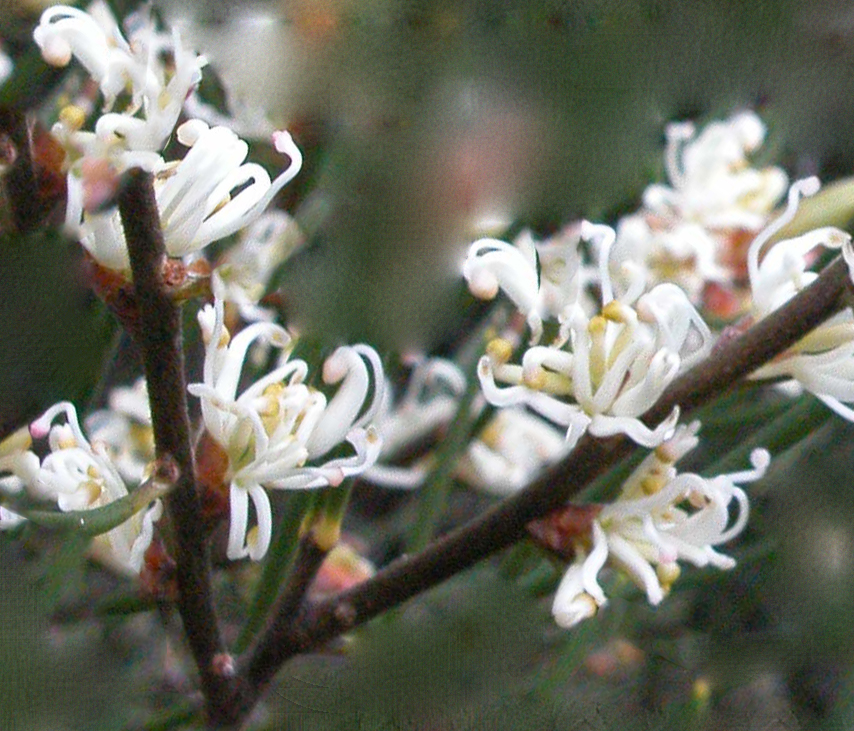
Flower of Hakea lissosperma

The mountain needlewood is a spreading shrub or small tree commonly with spiny leaves and dense clusters of white flowers, growing approximately from 2 to 6 metres (7 to 20 ft) in height. It is a low woody plant with several main stout branches. The flat evergreen leaves are terete, usually 6 to 10 centimetres (2.4 to 3.9 in) in length and 1.5 to 2 millimetres (0.059 to 0.079 in) wide. The leaf follicles are usually 20 to 30 mm (0.79 to 1.18 in) long and 15 to 20 mm (0.59 to 0.79 in) wide while the mature ones are about 2.3 to 2.7 cm (0.91 to 1.06 in) and 1.7 to 2 cm (0.67 to 0.79 in) wide and coarsely wrinkled or blistered.

=== Flowers and Regeneration ===
Flowers commonly form in late spring and early summer between October and December in alpine areas, earlier at lower altitudes. The flowers are white or cream in colour and clustered in leaf axils on stalks usually 4 to 6 mm (0.157 to 0.236 in) long. The perianth is usually glabrous and 5 to 6 mm (0.197 to 0.236 in) in length. The fruit that forms after flowering commonly becomes hard and brown or grey-brown when it is mature usually in the second year after flowering. Immature fruit will not ripen off the plant and fruit is usually held on the plant for several years. Seed is usually not occupying whole valve face. Each seed is usually 17 to 23 mm (0.669 to 0.906 in) long and 6.5 to 10.5 mm (0.256 to 0.413 in) wide. The seeds are wrinkled with a wing down one side only and dark blackish-brown in colour.

== Taxonomy ==
Hakea lissosperma was first formally described by Robert Brown in 1810 as part of the work On the natural order of plants called Proteaceae published in Transactions of the Linnean Society of London. The type specimen was collected in Tasmania on mountains between the Derwent and "Heron" rivers. The specific epithet (lissosperma) is derived from the Ancient Greek words lissos meaning "smooth" or "polished" and sperma meaning "seed".

== Distribution ==
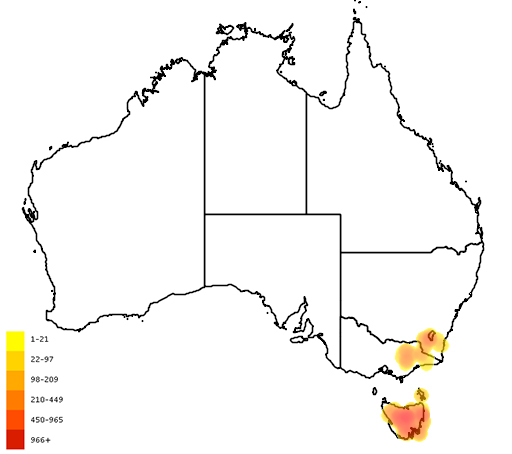
Distribution of Hakea lissosperma

H. lissosperma is found in Tasmania, Victoria, New South Wales and the Australian Capital Territory. In Tasmania the species is commonly found in the following areas: Break O'Day, Central Highlands, Circular Head, Derwent Valley, Dorset, Flinders Island, Glamorgan-Spring Bay, Hobart, Huon Valley, Kentish, Kingborough, Launceston, Meander Valley, Northern Midlands, Southern Midlands, Tasman, Waratah-Wynyard, West Coast. In Victoria it is found in the east parts including; East Gippsland, Fall Highlands, Victorian Alps and Snowy Mountains. In New South Wales it is found only in alpine areas in the south east surrounding the Australian Capital Territory.

== Habitat ==
The species is commonly found in wet Eucalypt forest and it is widespread especially on mountains to 1,200 metres (3,937 ft) and to sea level in areas of high rainfall. The tree is frost hardy and drought tolerant to cope with its habitat. It is also found in dry forest habitat at altitudes of 700 m (2,297 ft) in parts of Victoria It prefers a moist and shady site and grows well in fertile, loam soils but is phosphorus intolerant.

== Cultivation ==
This tree should only be planted in a sheltered location. Seeds can be collected any time of year but only from older fruit which is usually grey-brown in colour. The seeds must then be leached and the dry fruit will usually open in 2–3 weeks or place in an oven 80 to 100 °C (176 to 212 °F) for 30 minutes with the door partially open. Besides leaching, stratification can also be used. Once planted the germination time is approximately 6 months. The species is a favourite of birds due to the dense clusters of flowers and pungent rigid needle-shaped leaves which can be a shelter against predators. It is also resistant to wildlife browsing due to its unpalatability.
