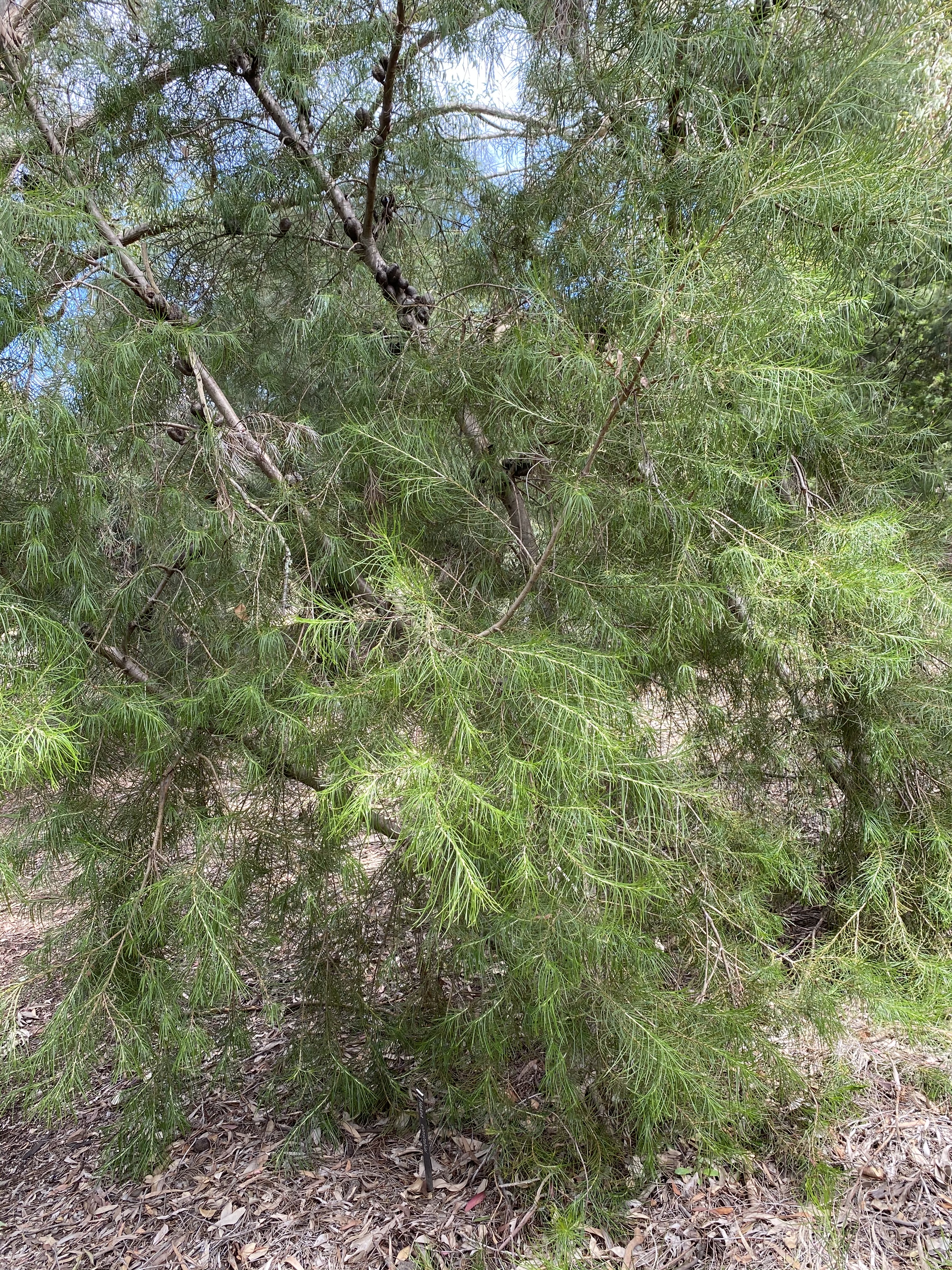

Scientific classification
- Kingdom: Plantae
- Clade: Tracheophytes
- Clade: Angiosperms
- Clade: Eudicots
- Order: Proteales
- Family: Proteaceae
- Genus: Hakea
- Species: H. constablei

Binomial name
- Hakea constablei L.A.S.Johnson
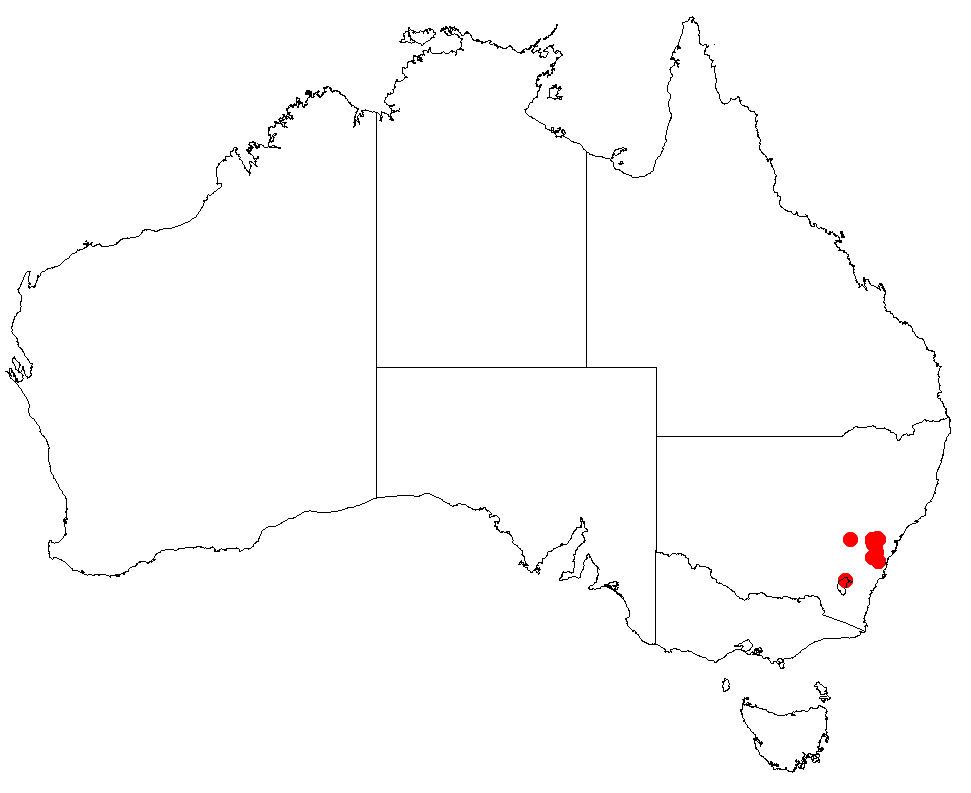
- Occurrence data from Australasian Virtual Herbarium

= Hakea constablei =

Species of shrub native to eastern Australia

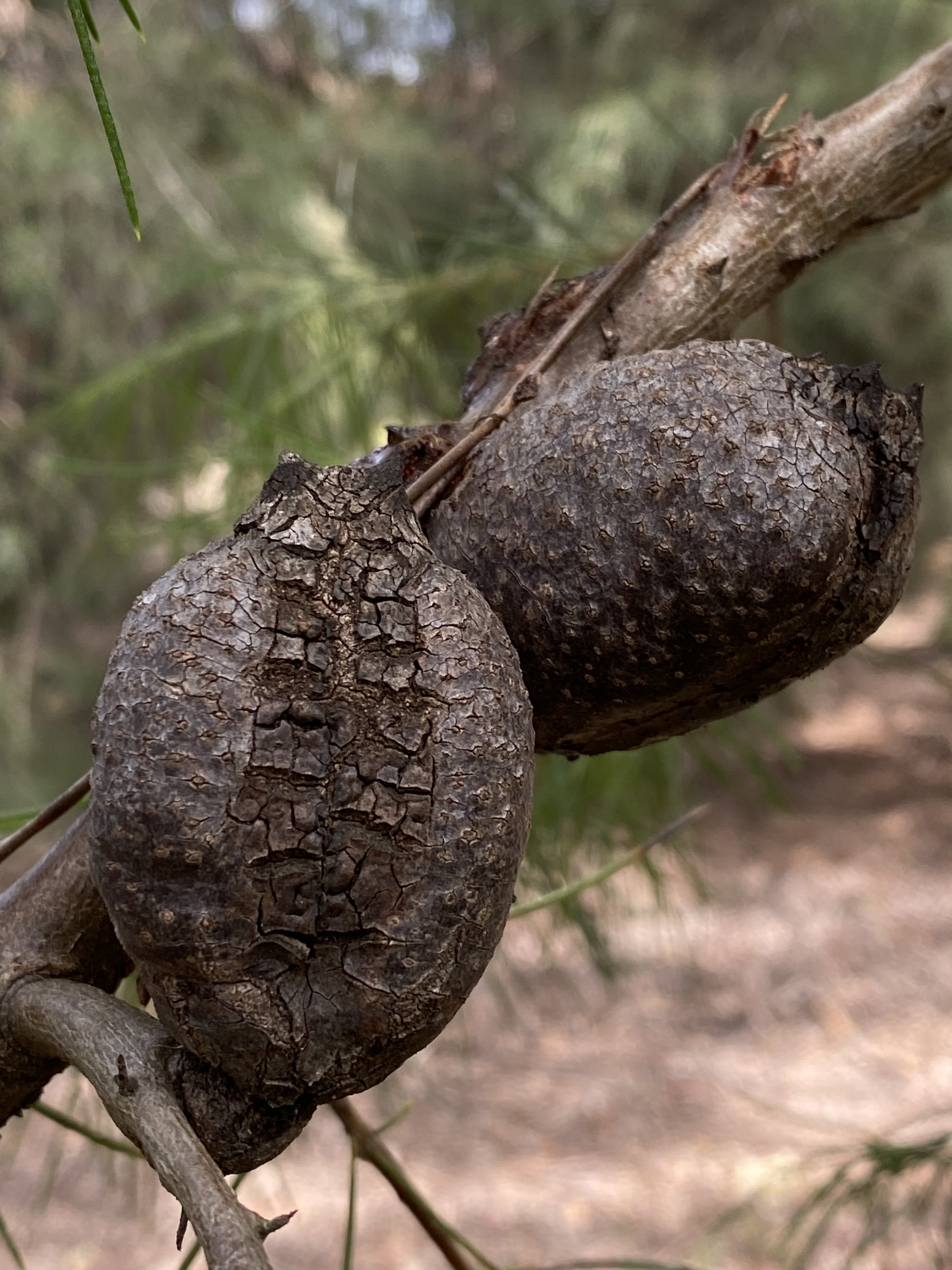
Fruit

Hakea constablei is a shrub in the Proteaceae family native to eastern Australia. A bushy shrub or small tree with a profusion of white or cream flowers in spring.

== Description ==
Hakea constablei is a compact rounded shrub to small tree growing to 1.8 to 6 metres (5.9 to 19.7 ft) high. The needle-shaped bright green pointed leaves are 3 to 11 centimetres (1 to 4 in) long and 1 to 1.6 millimetres (0.0 to 0.1 in) wide. New growth is hairy, branches are arching hanging loosely and despite the pointed leaves not particularly prickly. The bright green leaves are needle-shaped and about 10 cm (3.9 in) long. It produces cream-white flowers from September to November on the previous seasons stems. Each inflorescence is composed of 6 to 12 flowers with a cream white perianth that is 3–4.2 mm (0.12–0.17 in) long. The style about 10 mm (0.39 in) long with a cone shaped stigma. The large rounded fruit are 4.3 to 5.5 centimetres (1.69 to 2.17 in) long and 3 to 3.5 cm (1.18 to 1.38 in) wide. The dark grey surface is covered with warty protuberances, ending with horns 0.5 to 1.8 mm (0.020 to 0.071 in) long. The dark brown seed are 2.7 to 3.7 cm (1.06 to 1.46 in) long with a wing down one side.

== Taxonomy and naming ==
Hakea constablei was initially found in 1899 but the specimen was inadvertently stored with another Hakea. It was overlooked until 1950 when E.F. Constable collected the species near the Blue Mountains and brought it to the attention of botanists at the Sydney Herbarium. The species was first formally described by the botanist Lawrence Alexander Sidney Johnson in 1962 and published in Contributions from the New South Wales National Herbarium. The specific epithet honours Ernie Constable a former seed and plant collector for the Royal Botanic Gardens in Sydney. He collected mostly in New South Wales, including the type specimen for the species.

== Distribution and habitat ==
Hakea constablei is endemic to an area in the Blue Mountains and Wollondilly catchment in New South Wales where it is found among elevated sandstone outcrops as part of sclerophyll forest communities.

== Conservation status ==
Hakea constablei is considered rare, ROTAP conservation code 2RCa, Briggs, Leigh and Hartley 1996.
