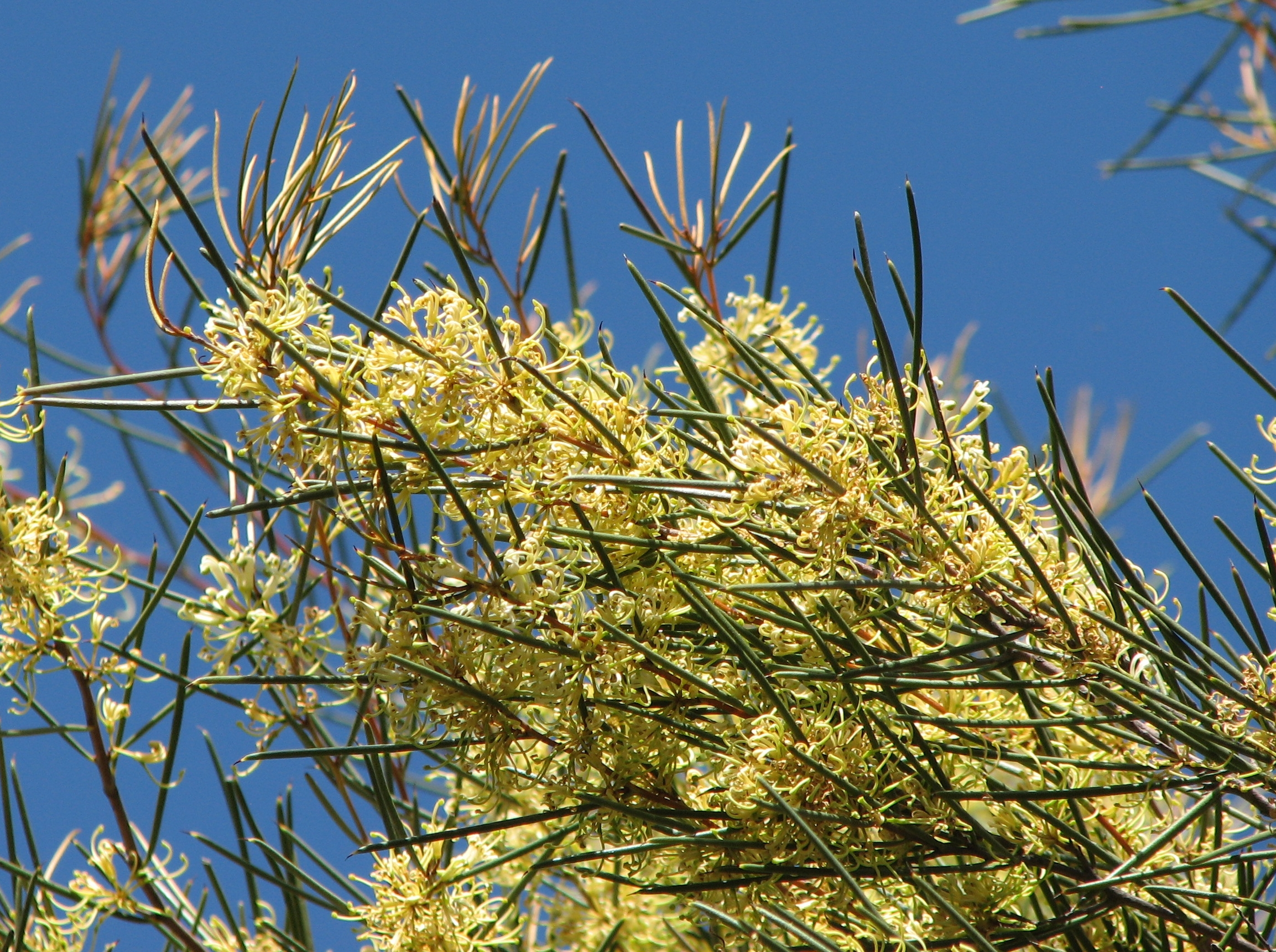

Scientific classification
- Kingdom: Plantae
- Clade: Embryophytes
- Clade: Tracheophytes
- Clade: Spermatophytes
- Clade: Angiosperms
- Clade: Eudicots
- Order: Proteales
- Family: Proteaceae
- Genus: Hakea
- Species: H. tephrosperma

Binomial name
- Hakea tephrosperma R.Br.

= Hakea tephrosperma =

Species of plant

Hakea tephrosperma, commonly known as hooked needlewood, is an Australian shrub or small tree species in the family Proteaceae. It has cream flowers, needle-shaped leaves and is one of the taller species in its genus, adaptable for dry to temperate locations.

== Description ==
Hakea tephrosperma is a large upright multi-stemmed shrub or small tree growing to 8 m (26 ft) high and forms a lignotuber. The smaller branches are rusty coloured with flat silky hairs or may be densely covered with short white, woolly, soft matted hairs. The needle-shaped leaves are smooth 3–8 cm (1–3 in) long, 1–1.8 mm (0.04–0.07 in) wide and ending in a small curved hook 0.8–2 mm (0.03–0.08 in) long. The inflorescence has a short red-brown stalk 1–3 mm (0.039–0.12 in) long, covered in fine soft hairs. The inflorescence consists of 6–22 flowers, each individual flower has a stalk 3.5–7 mm (0.1–0.3 in) long. The pedicel and perianth are white and red-brown with fine soft matted hairs. Racemes of cream flowers appear in the leaf axils between September and October. The egg-shaped fruit are mostly smooth 2–3 cm (0.8–1 in) long and 1.5–2 cm (0.59–0.79 in) wide, occasionally with small blister-like protuberances. The fruit ending with blunt conspicuous horns up to 2 mm (0.08 in) long.

== Taxonomy and naming ==
Hakea tephrosperma was first formally described in 1830 by botanist Robert Brown in Supplementum primum prodromi florae Novae Hollandiae. The specific epithet (tephrosperma) is derived from the Ancient Greek words tephros meaning "ash-coloured" and sperma meaning "seed" referring to the colour of the seed.

== Distribution and habitat ==
Hooked needlewood is a widespread species occurring in drier areas of Queensland, New South Wales, Victoria and South Australia. It grows in open spinifex and blue-bush (Maireana species) shrubland as an individual tree or in dense thickets on coarse soils. The hooked needlewood is an adaptable species for dry to temperate locations but rarely seen in cultivation.
