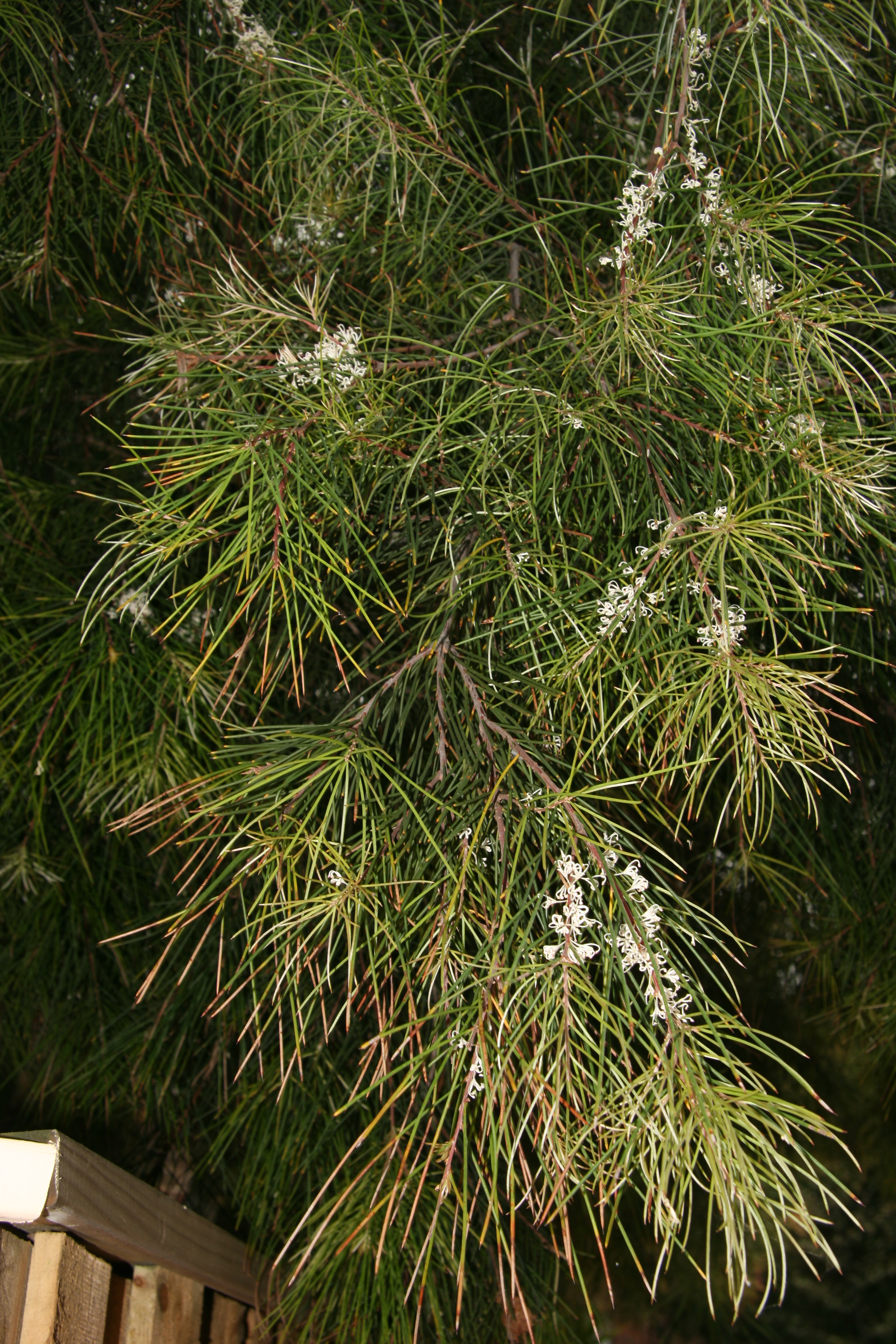

Scientific classification
- Kingdom: Plantae
- Clade: Tracheophytes
- Clade: Angiosperms
- Clade: Eudicots
- Order: Proteales
- Family: Proteaceae
- Genus: Hakea
- Species: H. macraeana

Binomial name
- Hakea macraeana F.Muell.
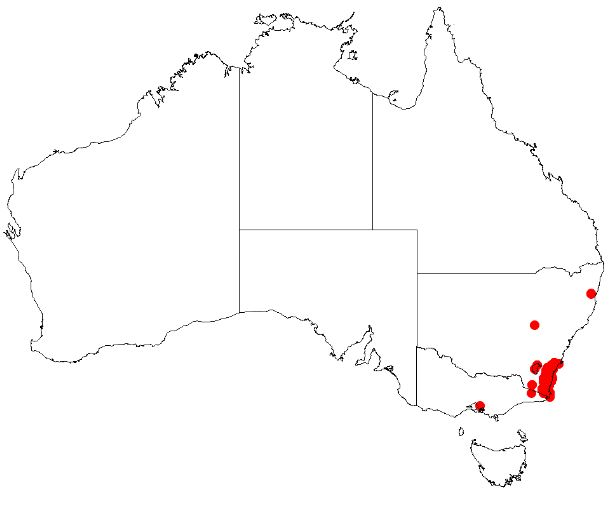
- Occurrence data from AVH

= Hakea macraeana =

Species of shrub native to eastern Australia

Hakea macraeana, commonly known as the willow needlewood or Macrae's hakea, is a species of shrub native to eastern Australia. The species was first formally described by botanist Ferdinand von Mueller in 1886 in the Australian Journal of Pharmacy. The species name honours one George Macrae, who aided the original collector William Baeuerlen.

Hakea macraeana grows as a shrub or small tree anywhere from 1 to 7.5 or 10 m (4–25 (35) ft) tall, and has drooping branches and needle-like leaves, which range from 4 to 15 centimetres (1.6 to 5.9 in) long, and are soft but tipped with a sharp point. The white or cream-white inflorescences appear along the stems from August to October, and are composed of two to six individual small flowers. Flowering is followed by the development of oval-shaped woody seed pods. Warty and brown, they are 2.8–4 centimetres (1.1–1.6 in) long and 1.8–2.4 centimetres (0.71–0.94 in) wide. Each contains two dark grey or dark brown seeds which are 2.2 to 2.7 millimetres (0.087 to 0.106 in) long and bear a membranous "wing".

The range is the south coast and southern tablelands of New South Wales to altitudes of 1,060 metres (3,480 ft). A population from Dorrigo in northern New South Wales has since been classified as a separate species H. ochroptera. Hakea macraeana is an understory plant of sclerophyll forest on rocky soils. The species' response to bushfire is unknown.

Rarely cultivated, the willow needlewood has potential as a screening plant. It adapts readily to cultivation and is tolerant of light or heavy soils. Faring better in climates of over 450 millimetres (18 in) annual rainfall, Hakea macraeana is tolerant of moderate frosts.
