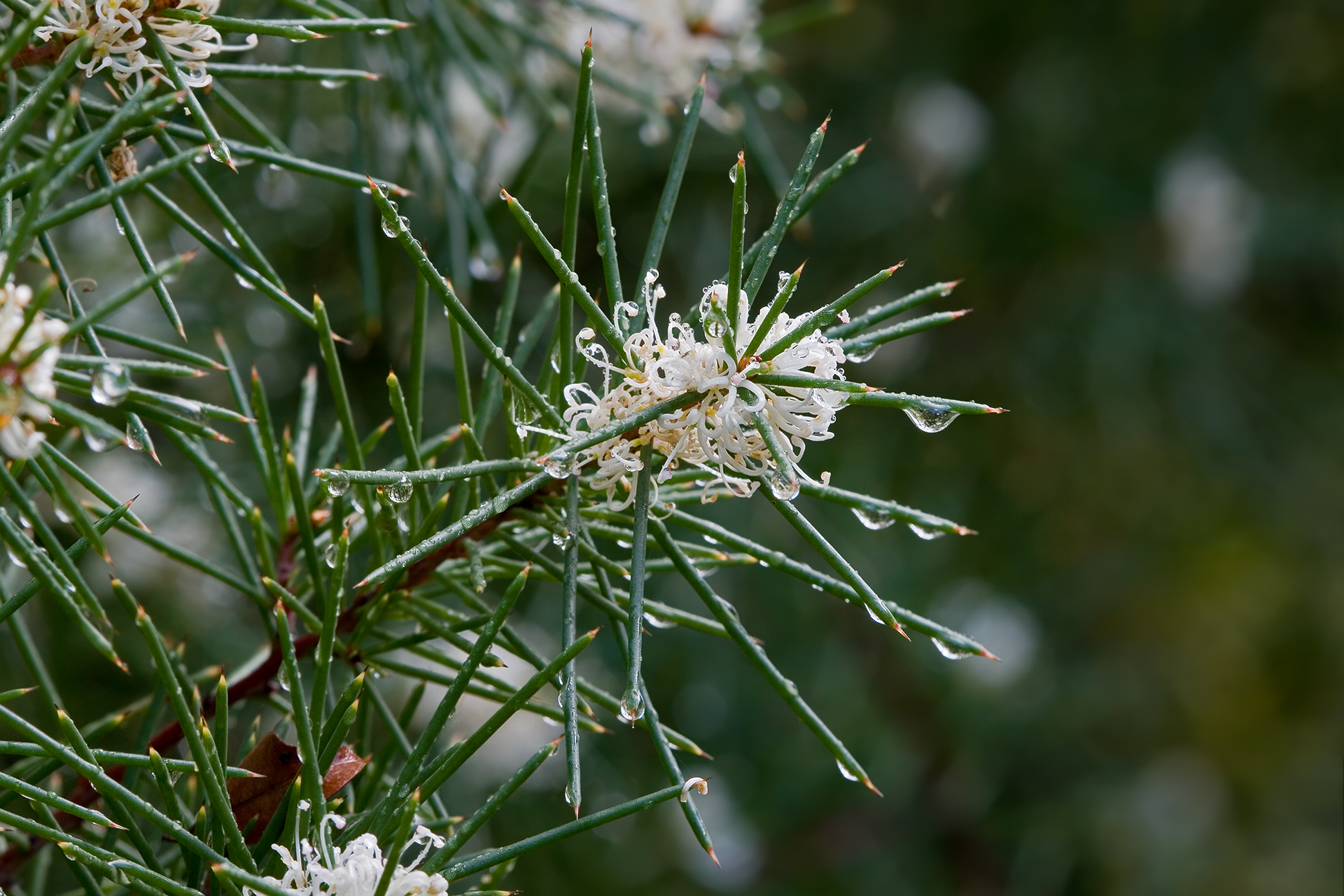
- Subspecies physocarpa

Conservation status
- Least Concern (IUCN 3.1)

Scientific classification
- Kingdom: Plantae
- Clade: Embryophytes
- Clade: Tracheophytes
- Clade: Spermatophytes
- Clade: Angiosperms
- Clade: Eudicots
- Order: Proteales
- Family: Proteaceae
- Genus: Hakea
- Species: H. decurrens

Binomial name
- Hakea decurrens R.Br.
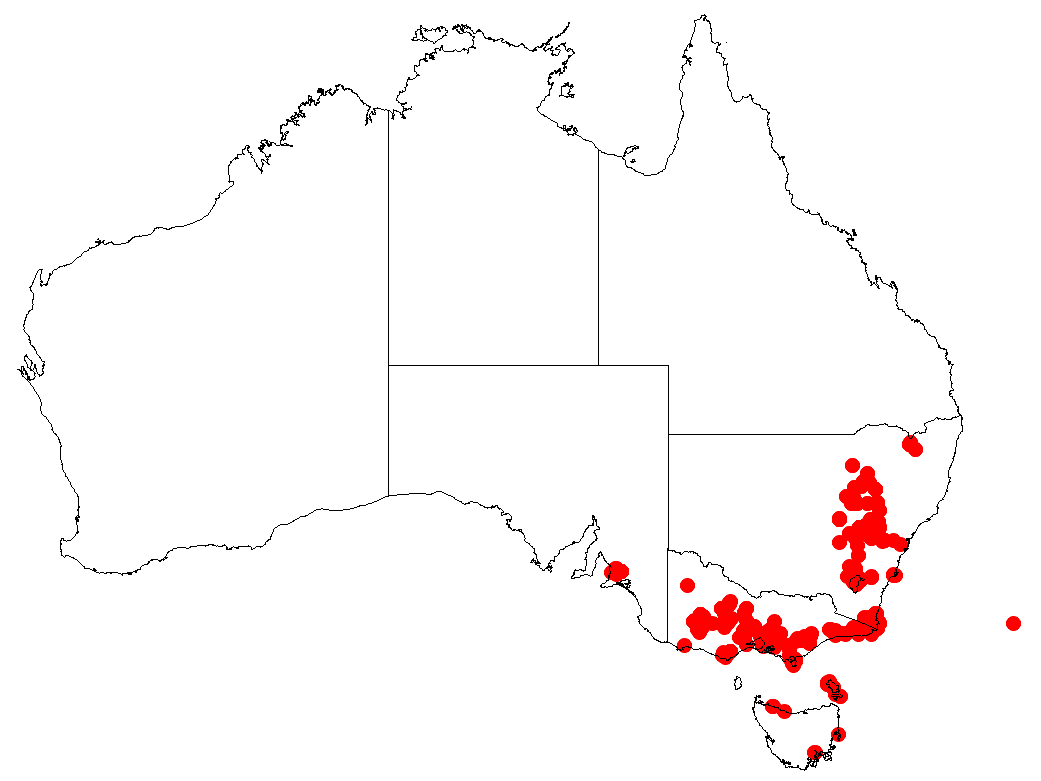
- Occurrence data from AVH

= Hakea decurrens =

Species of plant native to Australia

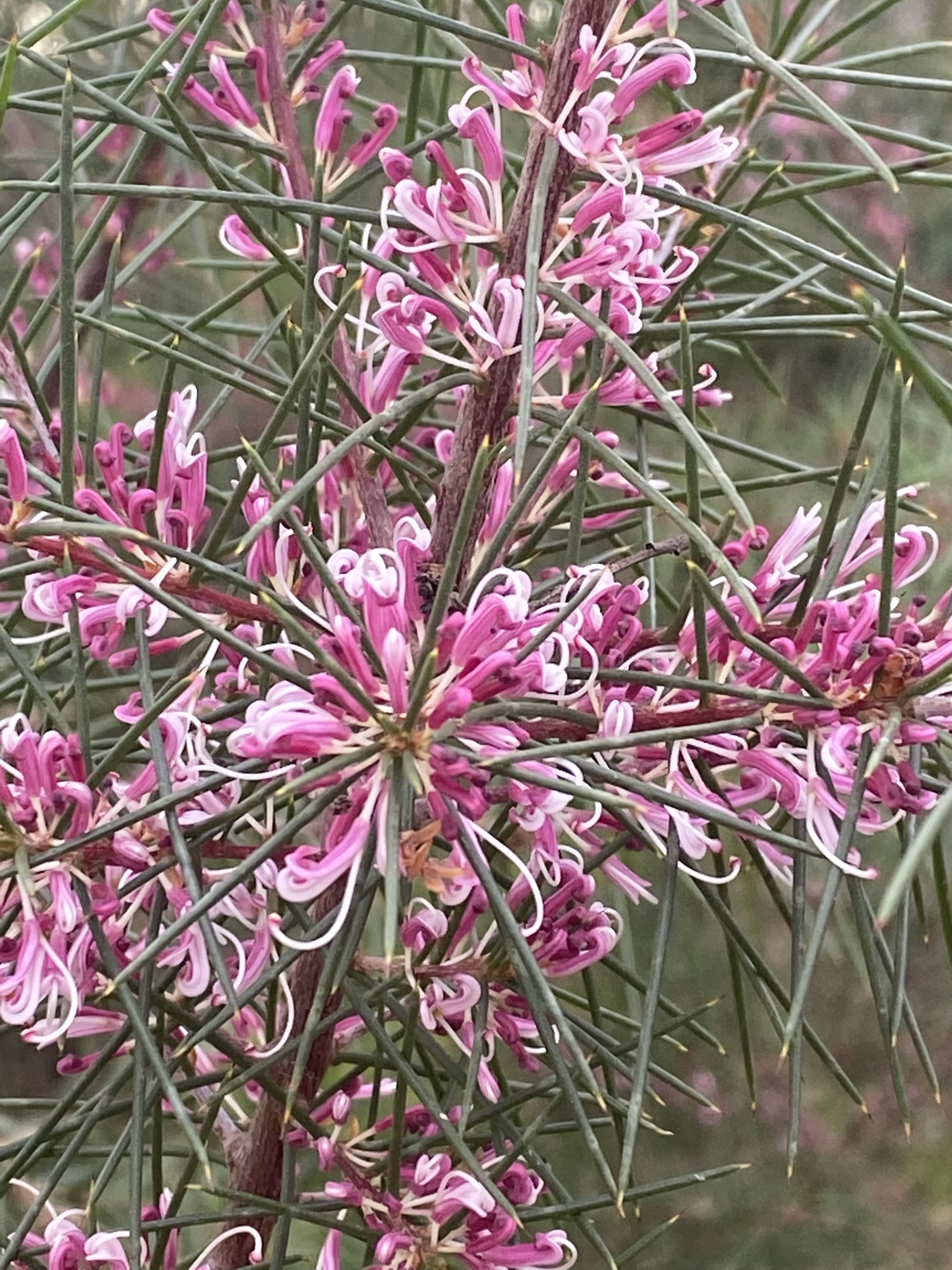
Pink form

Hakea decurrens, commonly known as bushy needlewood, is a species of shrub or small tree in the family Proteaceae.

== Description ==
Hakea decurrens is a semi-prostrate to erect scrambling bush or small tree 0.4–5 m (1–20 ft) tall. Smaller branches have short densely matted silky hairs, occasionally some quickly becoming smooth. Leaves are needle-shaped, widely spreading horizontally, are 1.5–8 cm (0.6–3 in) long and 0.7–1.6 mm (0.03–0.06 in) wide. The smooth leaves are grooved on the underside ending with a sharp point 1–3.5 mm (0.04–0.1 in) long. The inflorescence consists in 1–6 white or pink flowers on a short white or rusty slightly hairy or densely matted hairy short stalk. The hairs extending onto a 1.2–4.8 mm (0.047–0.19 in) long pedicel. The smooth perianth is 4.2–7.2 mm (0.17–0.28 in) long. The style is 8.5–12.2 mm (0.33–0.48 in) long. A profusion of flowers appear in leaf axils from May to September. The grey woody fruit are broadly egg-shaped, 1.8–3.5 cm (0.7–1 in) long and 1–3 cm (0.39–1.2 in) wide, covered in distinct warts ending in a prominent beak with two small horns.

== Taxonomy and naming ==
Hakea decurrens was first formally described in 1830 by Robert Brown in Supplementum primum prodromi florae Novae Hollandiae. The specific epithet (decurrens) is a Latin word, meaning "decurrent" or "prolonged below the point of insertion", referring to the insertion of the leaf on the stem.

In 1996, William Robert Barker described three subspecies of Hakea decurrens in the Journal of the Adelaide Botanic Gardens and the names are accepted by the Australian Plant Census.

- Hakea decurrens subsp. decurrens on younger branches has flattened hairs, quickly becoming smooth and the fruit 1–1.8 cm (0.39–0.71 in) wide;
- Hakea decurrens subsp. platytaenia has persistent raised hairs and fruit 2.6–3.5 cm (1.0–1.4 in) wide;
- Hakea decurrens subsp. physocarpa has flattened hairs, quickly lost. Fruit 1.3–2.5 cm (0.51–0.98 in) wide.

== Distribution and habitat ==
The species is native and widespread in New South Wales, Victoria and Tasmania in Australia. Additionally, it is naturalised in South Australia and Portugal.

The distribution of the three subspecies is as follows:

- H. decurrens subsp. decurrens, occurs on the western slopes and plains of the Great Dividing Range of New South Wales;
- H. decurrens subsp. platytaenia, occurs in exposed coastal heaths in southeastern New South Wales, eastern Victoria and the Bass Strait Islands.
- H. decurrens subsp. physocarpa, occurs in New South Wales, Victoria and the Bass Strait Islands. In Tasmania it is thought to be native to the north and naturalised in the south. It is also naturalised in the Mount Lofty Ranges in South Australia and Portugal.
