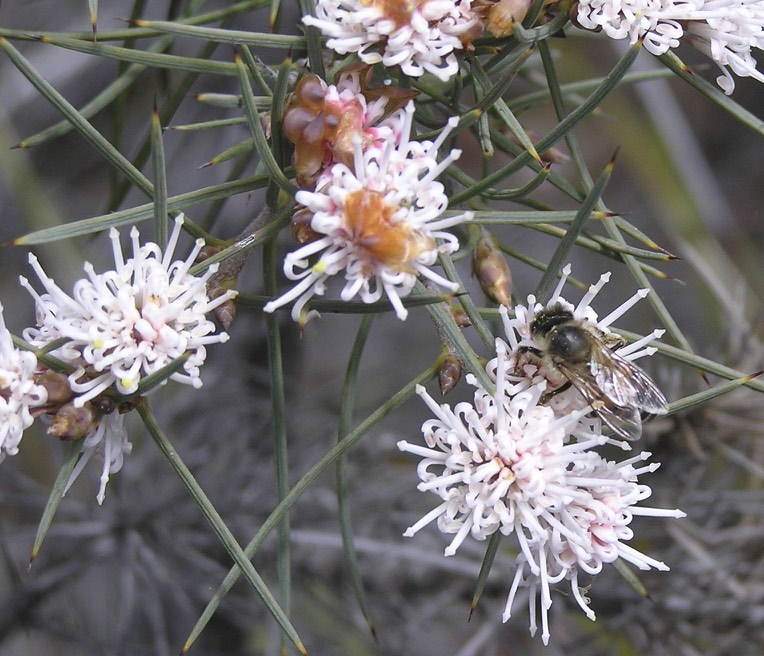
- Hakea gilbertii growing near Pingelly

Scientific classification
- Kingdom: Plantae
- Clade: Tracheophytes
- Clade: Angiosperms
- Clade: Eudicots
- Order: Proteales
- Family: Proteaceae
- Genus: Hakea
- Species: H. gilbertii

Binomial name
- Hakea gilbertii Kippist
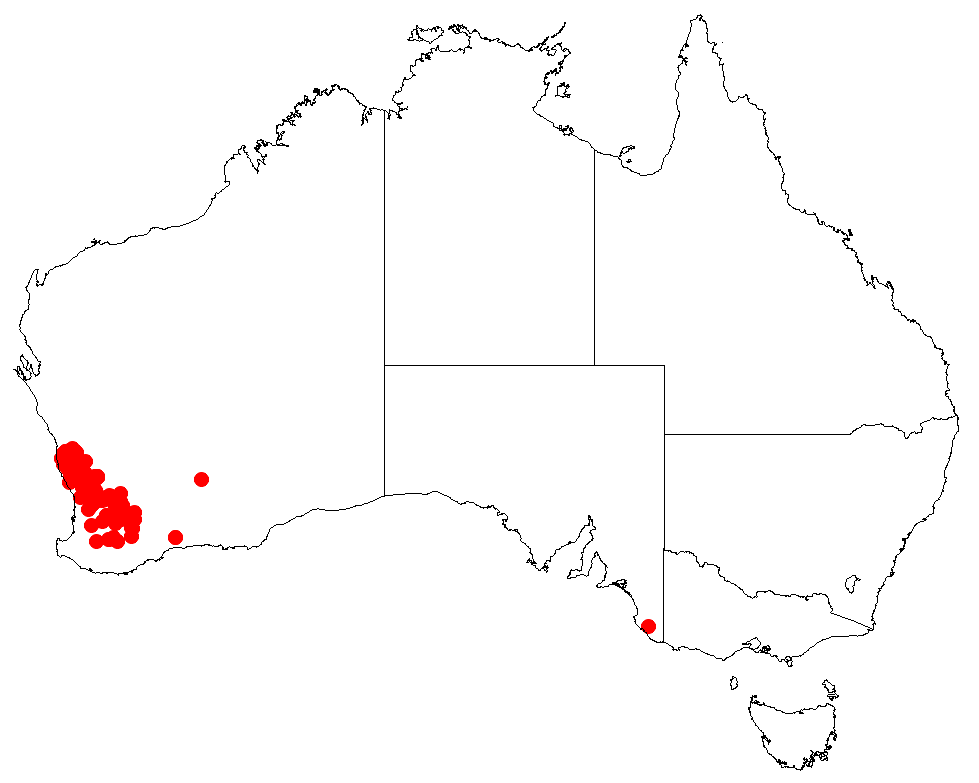
- Occurrence data from AVH

= Hakea gilbertii =

Species of shrub endemic to Western Australia

Hakea gilbertii is a shrub in the family Proteaceae and is endemic to an area in the Wheatbelt region of Western Australia. It is an upright, prickly shrub with greyish needle-shaped leaves and clusters of fragrant flowers from late winter to spring.

== Description ==
The erect, very prickly, densely branched shrub, typically grows to a height of 0.6 to 2 metres (2.0 to 6.6 ft) which short branchlets and does not form a lignotuber. It blooms from August to September and produces sweetly scented white-cream or red-pink flowers in large clusters in upper leaf axils. Grey-blue leaves are fine and terete 2–10 cm (0.8–4 in) long by 1 mm (0.04 in) wide ending in a very sharp point. The small fruit are smooth in between warty protuberances ending with a small backward pointed beak.

== Taxonomy and naming ==
Hakea gilbertii was first formally described in 1855 by English botanist Richard Kippist and the description was published in Hooker's Journal of Botany and Kew Garden Miscellany. This species was named after John Gilbert, the English naturalist and explorer.

== Distribution and habitat ==
This species grows from Eneabba through the central wheatbelt region of Western Australia south to Dumbleyung on sand, loam, clay and lateritic gravel in heath and scrubland. This species grows best in full sun where drainage is good. It is frost tolerant and moderately drought resistant. A good bird habitat due to its dense and prickly growth.

== Conservation status ==
Hakea gilbertii is classified as "not threatened" by the Western Australian Government.
