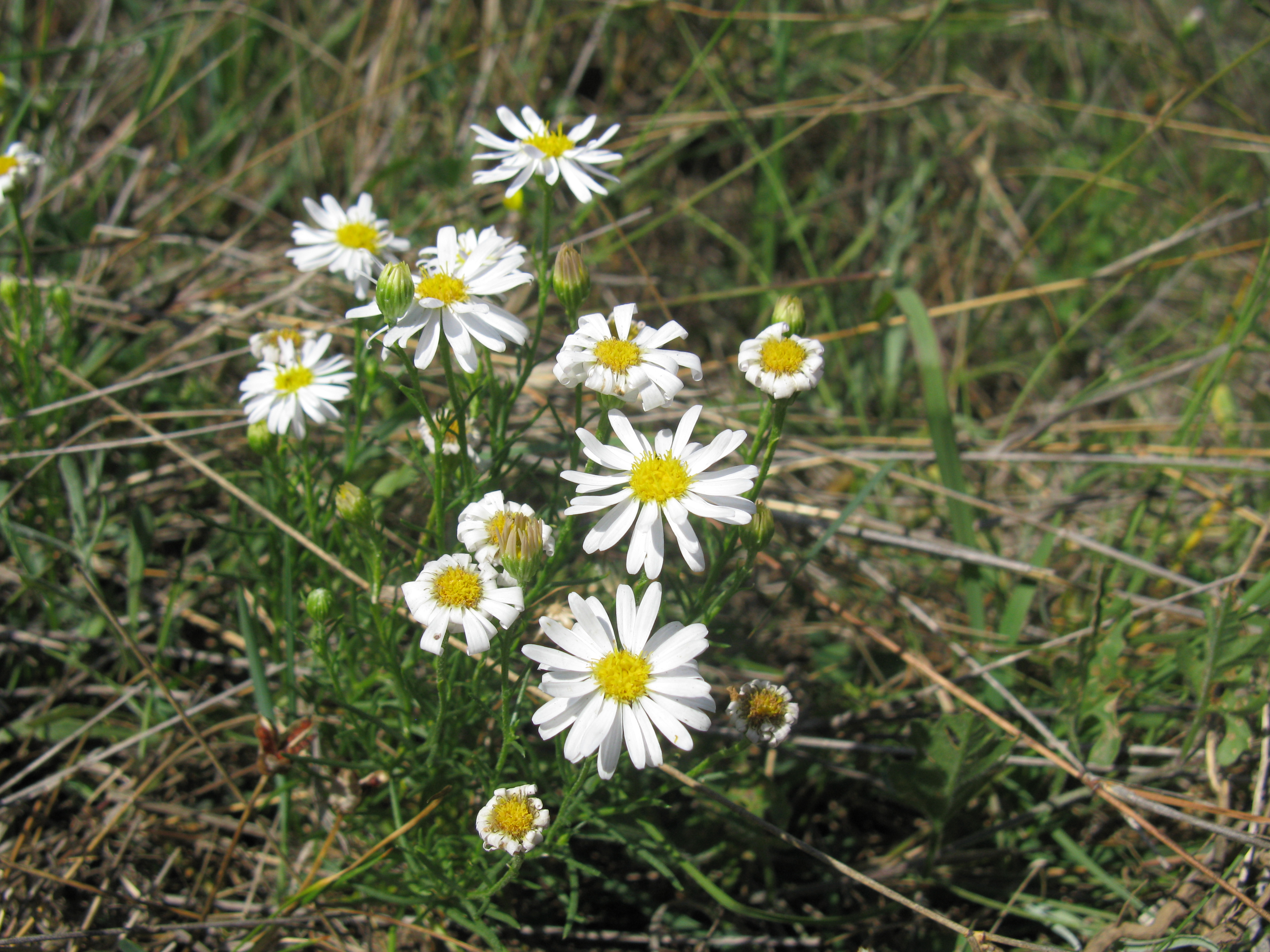
- Minuria leptophylla

Scientific classification
- Kingdom: Plantae
- Clade: Tracheophytes
- Clade: Angiosperms
- Clade: Eudicots
- Clade: Asterids
- Order: Asterales
- Family: Asteraceae
- Subfamily: Asteroideae
- Tribe: Astereae
- Subtribe: Brachyscominae
- Genus: Minuria; DC.

Synonyms
- Elachothamnos DC.; Eurybiopsis DC.; Minuriella Tate

= Minuria =

Genus of shrubs

Minuria is a genus of annuals, perennials and dwarf shrubs in the tribe Astereae within the family Asteraceae.

Species

All known species are endemic to Australia.

- Minuria annua (Tate) J.M.Black – annual minuria
- Minuria candollei (F.Muell.) F.Muell.
- Minuria cunninghamii (DC.) Benth. – bush minuria
- Minuria denticulata (DC.) Benth. – woolly minuria
- Minuria integerrima (DC.) Benth. – smooth minuria
- Minuria leptophylla DC. – minnie daisy
- Minuria macrocephala Lander & Barry
- Minuria macrorhiza (DC.) Lander
- Minuria multiseta P.S.Short
- Minuria rigida J.M.Black
- Minuria scoparia P.S.Short & J.R.Hosking
- Minuria tridens (D.A.Cooke) Lander

The monotypic genus Kippistia is sometimes included as M. suaedifolia (F.Muell.) F.Muell. ex Benth. – fleshy minuria
