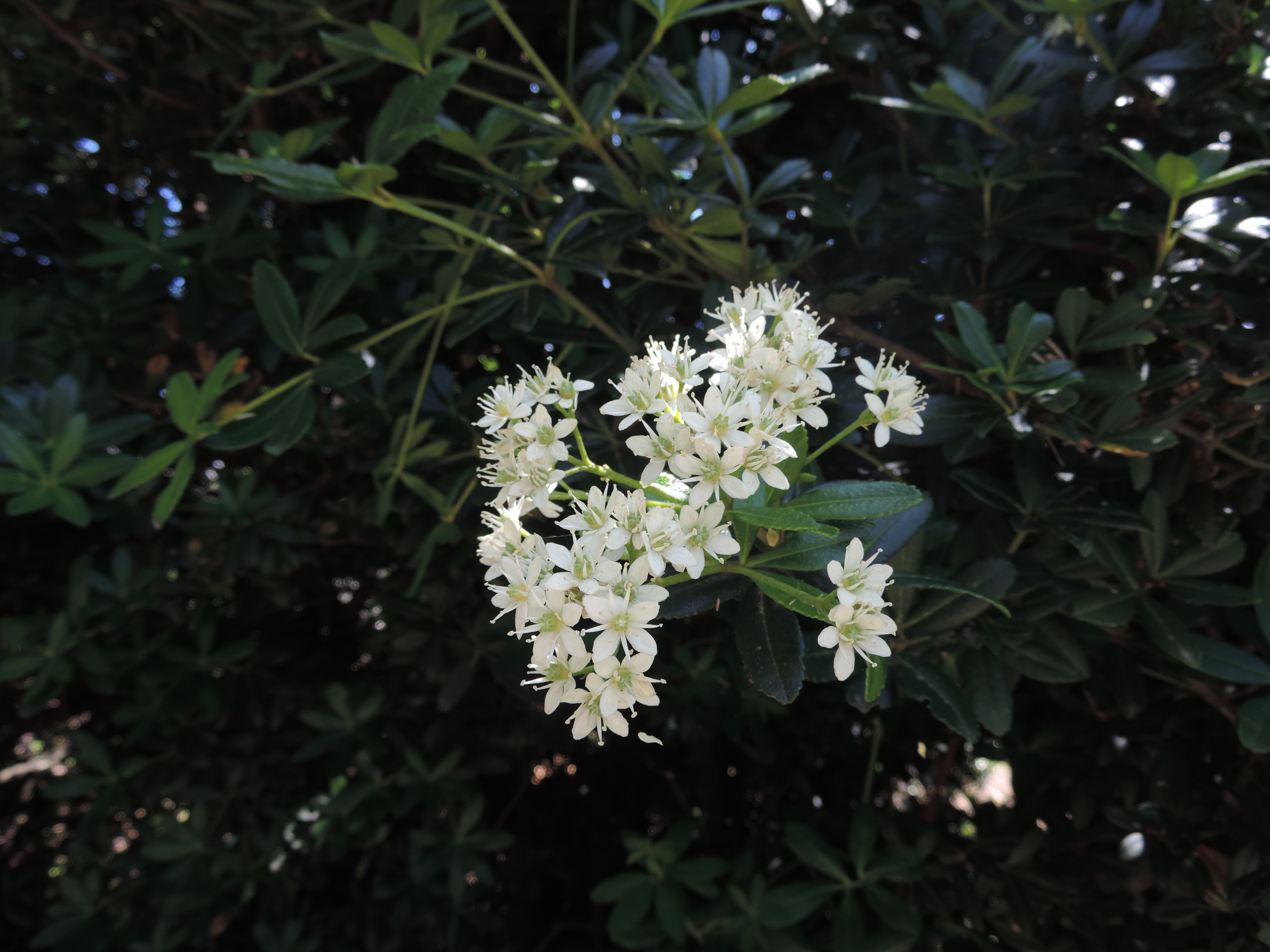
- Acradenia frankliniae in Dunedin Botanic Garden

Scientific classification
- Kingdom: Plantae
- Clade: Tracheophytes
- Clade: Angiosperms
- Clade: Eudicots
- Clade: Rosids
- Order: Sapindales
- Family: Rutaceae
- Genus: Acradenia
- Species: A. frankliniae

Binomial name
- Acradenia frankliniae Kippist

Synonyms
- Acradenia franklinii Curtis orth. var.; Acradenia zierioides Kippist nom. inval., pro syn.; Zieria frankliniae Kippist nom. inval., pro syn.

= Acradenia frankliniae =

Whitey wood

Species of flowering plant

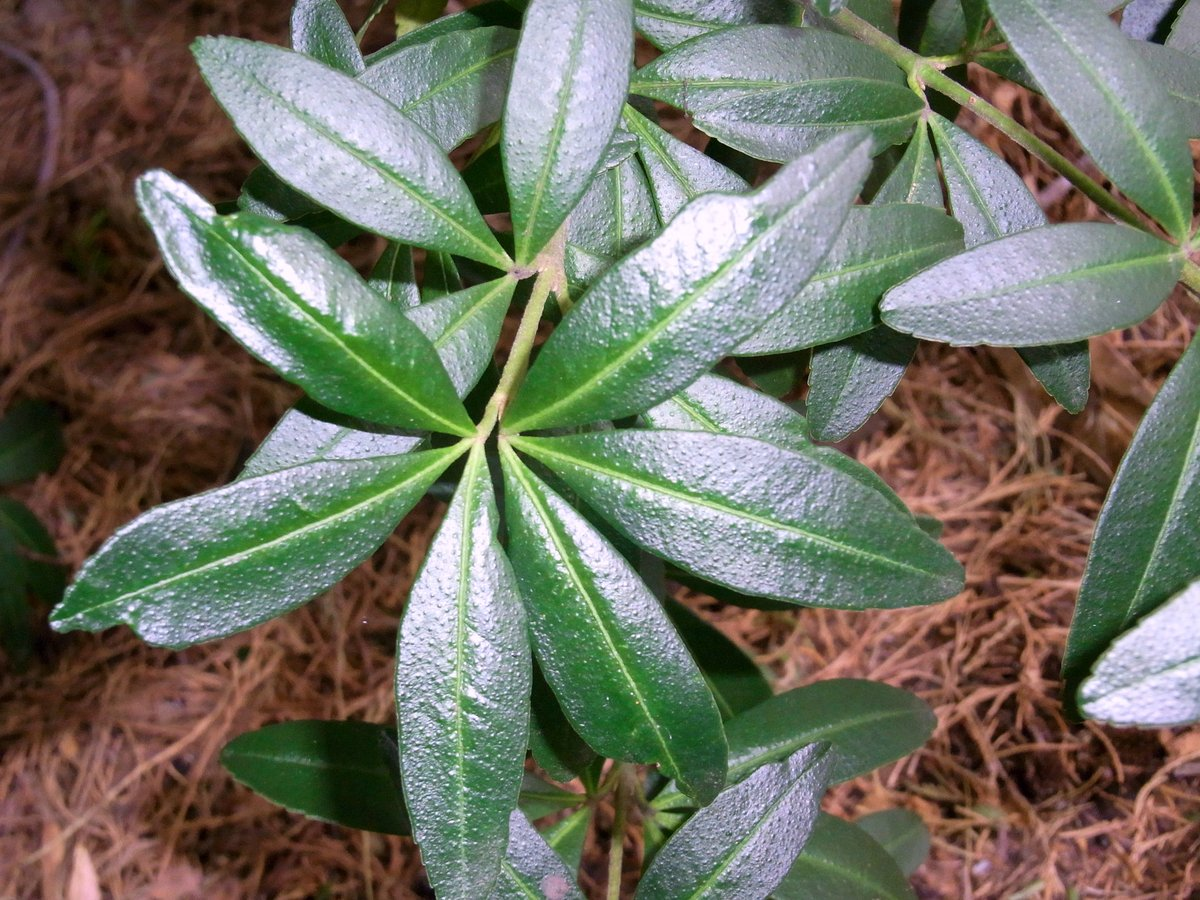
In Hobart showing trifoliate leaves

Acradenia frankliniae , commonly known as whitey wood or whity wood, is a species of shrub or small tree that is endemic to Tasmania. It has glandular-warty branchlets, trifoliate leaves with narrow elliptic to lance-shaped leaflets, and panicles of white flowers in leaf axils and on the ends of branchlets.

== Description ==
Acradenia frankliniae is a shrub or tree that grows to a height of about 7 m (23 ft) and has hairy, glandular-warty branchlets. The leaves are trifoliate, the leaflets narrow elliptic to lance-shaped with the narrower end towards the base, sometimes wavy near the tip and have prominent glands. The leaves are 20–60 mm (0.79–2.36 in) long and 5–20 mm (0.20–0.79 in) wide on a petiole 3–8 mm (0.12–0.31 in) long. The flowers are arranged in panicles, in leaf axils and on the ends of branchlets, and are 20–50 mm (0.79–1.97 in) long. The petals are white or creamy white, 4.5–6 mm (0.18–0.24 in) long with a few soft hairs on the back. Flowering occurs from November to February and mature fruits have been recorded from February to May.

== Taxonomy ==
Acradenia frankliniae was first formally described in 1853 by Richard Kippist in the Proceedings of the Linnean Society of London. The specific epithet (frankiniae) honours "Lady Franklin".

== Distribution and habitat ==
Whitey wood grows in rainforest in western Tasmania from the Pieman River south to the Gordon River, from sea level to an altitude of 200 m (660 ft).
