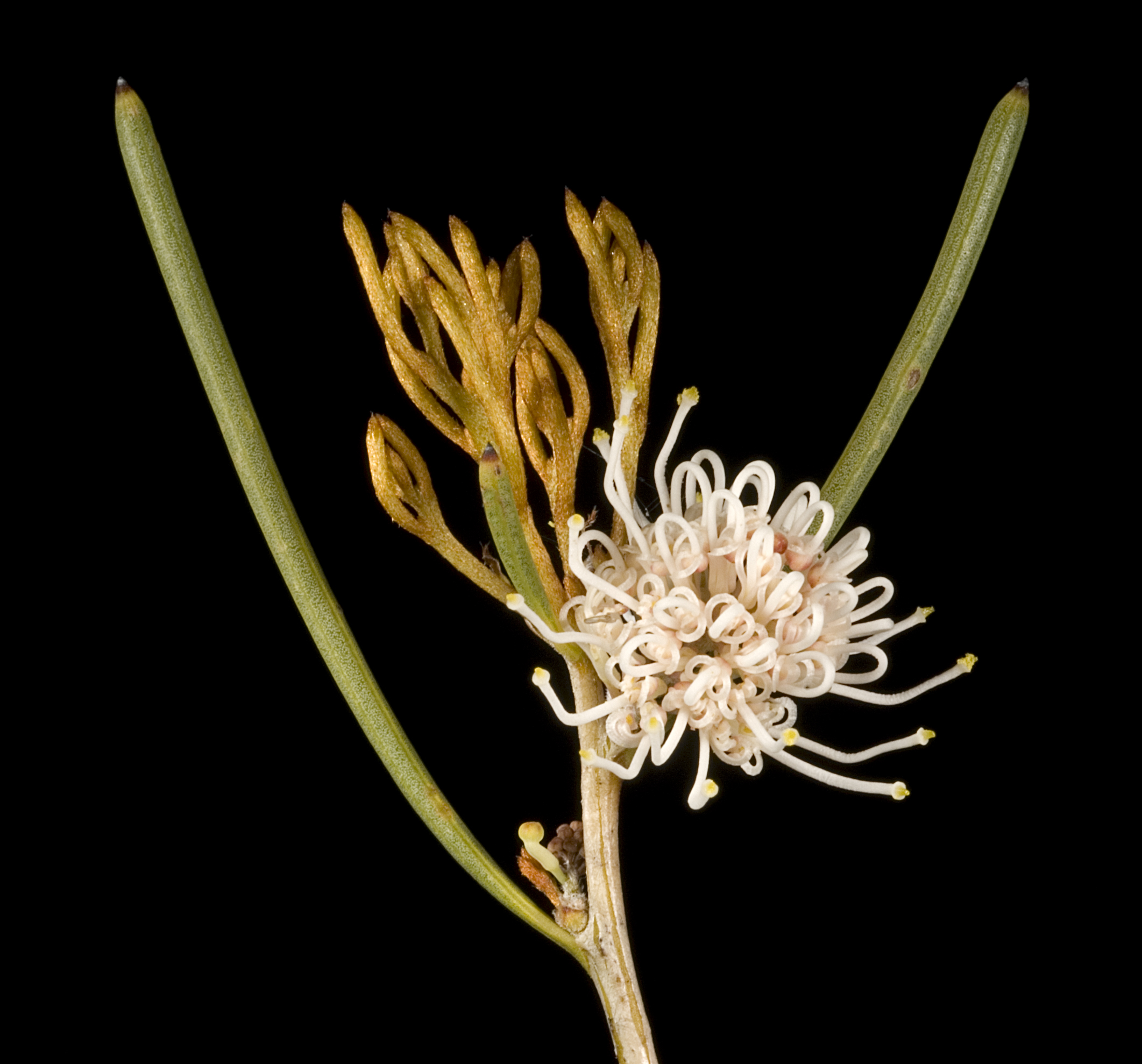

Scientific classification
- Kingdom: Plantae
- Clade: Tracheophytes
- Clade: Angiosperms
- Clade: Eudicots
- Order: Proteales
- Family: Proteaceae
- Genus: Hakea
- Species: H. meisneriana

Binomial name
- Hakea meisneriana Kippist
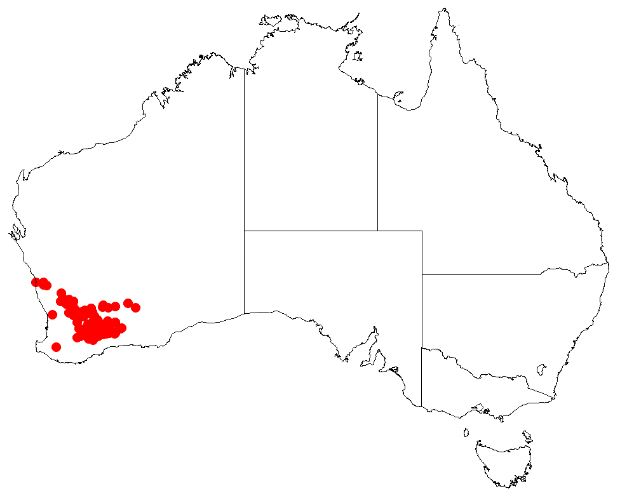
- Occurrence data from AVH

= Hakea meisneriana =

Species of shrub endemic to Western Australia

Hakea meisneriana is a shrub in the family Proteaceae and is endemic to Western Australia. It has small, nectar rich, creamy white flowers in clusters in the upper branches from August to November.

== Description ==
Hakea meisneriana is an erect open shrub with a broom-like appearance that typically grows to a height of 1 to 3 metres (3 to 10 ft) with smooth grey bark at flowering and ascending branches. The sage green terete leaves are rigid and may be up to 3–14 cm (1–6 in) long with 10 small grooves longitudinally along the leaf and ending with a sharp point. The smooth leaves are 1–1.5 mm (0.039–0.059 in) in diameter and hexagonal in cross-section. The inflorescence is a single cluster of 36–44 white or cream flowers in clusters in the upper leaf axils of branchlets. The pedicel is smooth, perianth cream-white and the pistils 8–10.5 mm (0.31–0.41 in) long. Flowering occurs from August to November. The small, slightly curved ovoid fruit are in groups of 1–4 on a thick stem, 0.9–1.9 cm (0.35–0.75 in) long, 0.6–1.2 cm (0.24–0.47 in) wide and tapering gradually to a beak with an easily broken point.

== Taxonomy and naming ==
Hakea meisneriana was first formally described by Richard Kippist in 1855 and the description was published in Hooker's Journal of Botany and Kew Garden Miscellany. Named in honour of Swiss botanist Carl Meissner who described many Hakea species.

== Distribution and habitat ==
It is endemic to an area in the Wheatbelt and Goldfields-Esperance region of Western Australia from Dalwallinu to Coolgardie and south to Dumbleyung and Norseman where it is found on sandplains growing in sandy, loamy and gravelly soils often above or around laterite.

== Conservation status ==
Hakea meisneriana is classified as "not threatened" by the Western Australian Government Department of Parks and Wildlife.
