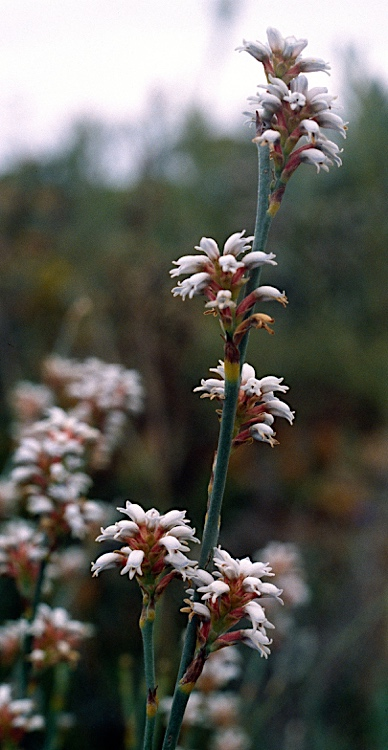
- Near Lake King

Scientific classification
- Kingdom: Plantae
- Clade: Tracheophytes
- Clade: Angiosperms
- Clade: Eudicots
- Order: Proteales
- Family: Proteaceae
- Genus: Conospermum
- Species: C. ephedroides

Binomial name
- Conospermum ephedroides Kippist ex Meisn.

= Conospermum ephedroides =

Species of shrub native to Australia

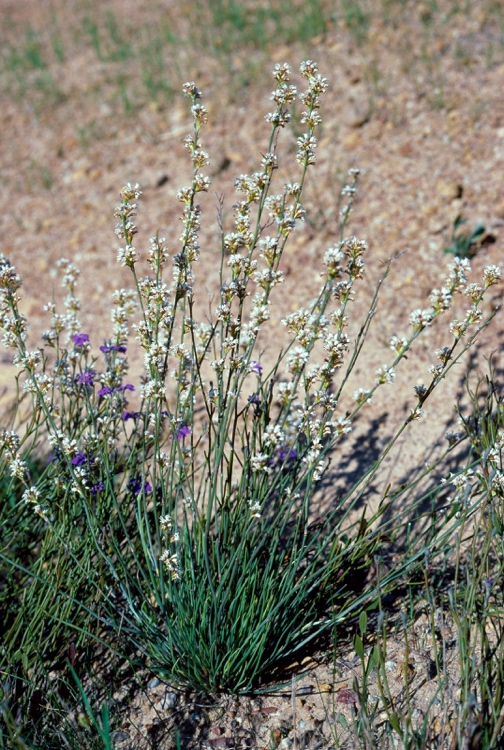
Habit near Corrigin

Conospermum ephedroides is a species of flowering plant in the family Proteaceae and is endemic to the south-west of Western Australia. It is a tufted shrub with many stems, a few cylindrical leaves at the base of the plant, and sessile spikes of glabrous white, pale pink or blue, tube-shaped flowers and reddish-brown to orange nuts.

== Description ==
Conospermum ephedroides is a tufted shrub that typically grows up to 0.3–1 m (1 ft 0 in – 3 ft 3 in) tall and has many stems. There are a few cylindrical leaves 40–180 mm (1.6–7.1 in) long and 0.6–1 mm (0.024–0.039 in) wide at the base of the plant. The flowers are arranged in sessile spikes along leafless branches with egg-shaped, bluish-green bracteoles 2.5–4.5 mm (0.098–0.177 in) long and 1.5–3 mm (0.059–0.118 in) wide. The perianth is glabrous, white, pale pink or blue, forming a tube 2.2–4.5 mm (0.087–0.177 in) long. The upper lip is egg-shaped, 3.0–4.5 mm (0.12–0.18 in) long and 1.2–2.0 mm (0.047–0.079 in) wide, the lower lip joined for 1.0–1.6 mm (0.039–0.063 in) with lobes 2–3 mm (0.079–0.118 in) long. Flowering occurs from August to October, and the fruit is a reddish-brown to orange nut 1.5–2.0 mm (0.059–0.079 in) long and 1.4–1.8 mm (0.055–0.071 in) wide.

== Taxonomy ==
Conospermum ephedroides was first formally described in 1855 by Carl Meissner in Hooker's Journal of Botany and Kew Garden Miscellany, from an unpublished description by Richard Kippist. The specific epithet (ephedroides) means 'Ephedra-like'.

== Distribution and habitat ==
This species of Conospermum grows in sand, lateritic loam and gravel between Wongan Hills and Newdegate in the Avon Wheatbelt, Jarrah Forest and Mallee bioregions of south-western Western Australia.

== Conservation status ==
This species of Conospermum is listed as "not threatened" by the Government of Western Australia Department of Biodiversity, Conservation and Attractions.
