= Leioproctus recurvatus =

Scientific classification
- Kingdom: Animalia
- Phylum: Arthropoda
- Clade: Pancrustacea
- Class: Insecta
- Order: Hymenoptera
- Family: Colletidae
- Genus: Leioproctus
- Species: L. recurvatus

Binomial name
- Leioproctus recurvatus Batley, 2025

Species of bee

Leioproctus recurvatus, or Leioproctus (Euryglossidia) recurvatus, is a species of bee in the family Colletidae and subfamily Colletinae. It is endemic to Australia. It was described by entomologist Michael Batley in 2025.

== Etymology ==
The specific epithet recurvatus (Latin: "bent backwards") is an anatomical reference to the mid basitibia of the male.

== Description ==
The female body length is 5 mm, the male 5 mm. Integumental colouration is mainly black. The hair is white to brown.

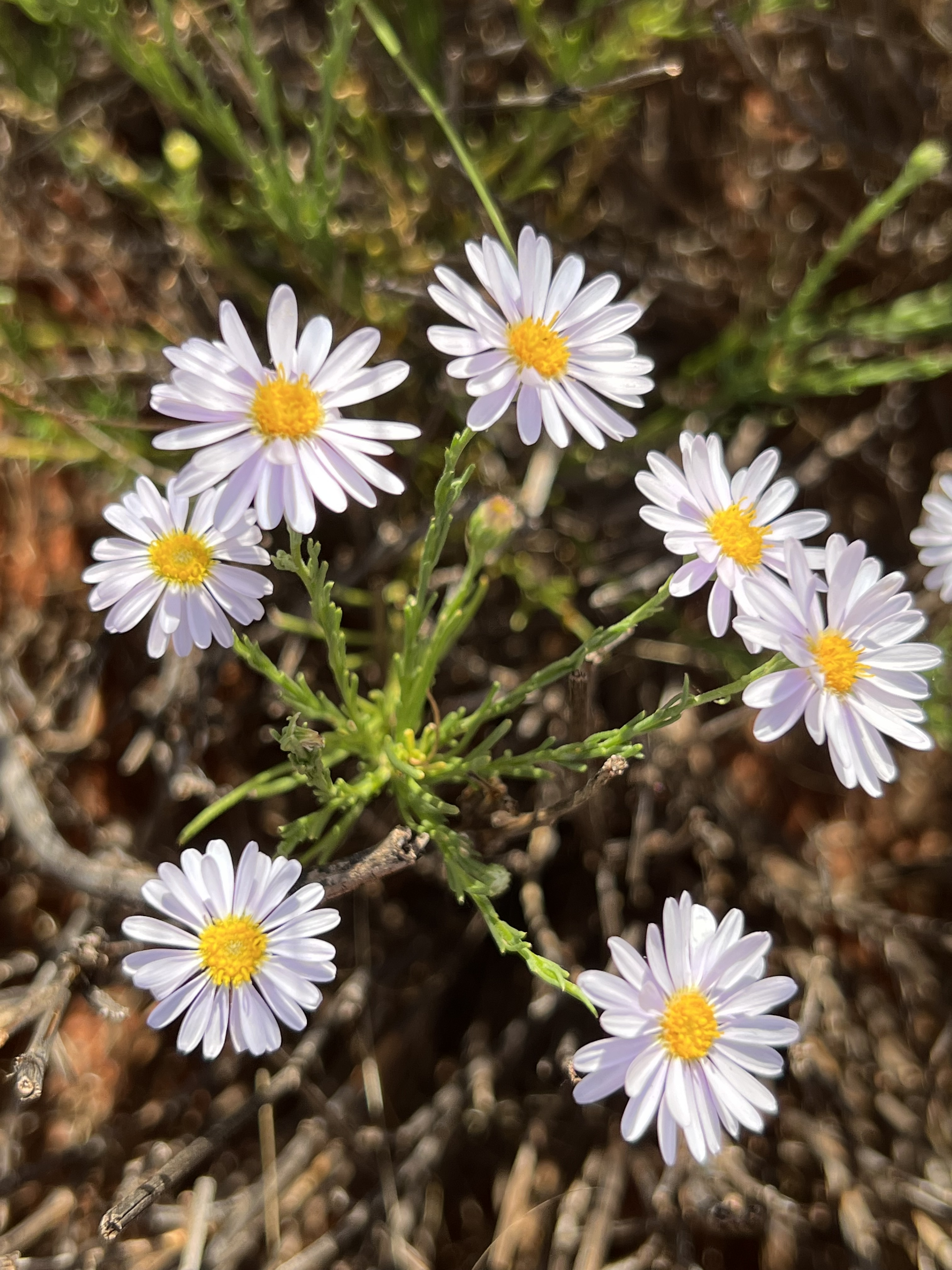
Flowers of Minuria leptophylla (minnie daisy), a forage plant of the bees

== Distribution and habitat ==
The species occurs in western New South Wales. The type locality is 2 km south of Mount Hope.

== Behaviour ==
The adults are flying mellivores. Flowering plants visited by the bees include Minuria leptophylla.
