= Hakea kippistiana =

Scientific classification
- Kingdom: Plantae
- Clade: Tracheophytes
- Clade: Angiosperms
- Clade: Eudicots
- Order: Proteales
- Family: Proteaceae
- Genus: Hakea
- Species: H. kippistiana

Binomial name
- Hakea kippistiana Meisn.
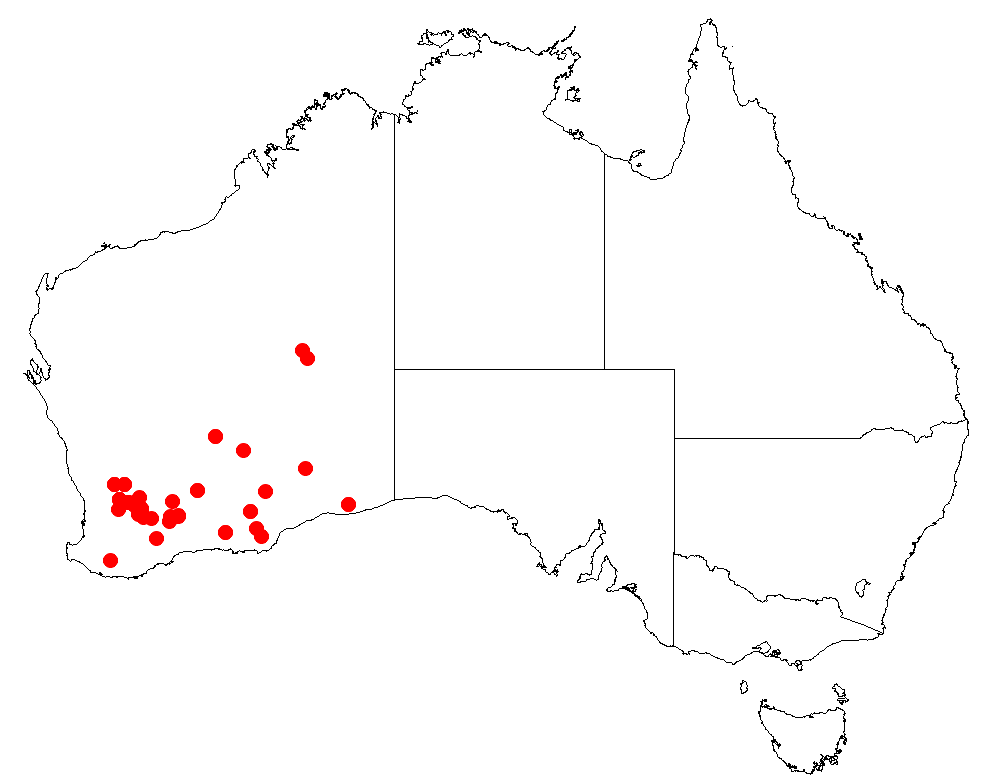
- Occurrence data from AVH

Species of shrub endemic to Western Australia

Hakea kippistiana is a shrub in the family Proteaceae and endemic to Western Australia. It is a dense prickly shrub with sharp needle-shaped leaves with fragrant white, cream or pink flowers from November to February.

== Description ==
Hakea kippistiana is a woody shrub or small tree with spreading branches growing to a height of 1 to 5 metres (3 to 16 ft) and forms a lignotuber. The branchlets are covered in white and rust coloured flattened hairs but quickly become smooth except at the leaf base. The dark green needle-shaped leaves are 2.5 to 7.5 centimetres (1.0 to 3.0 in) long and 1 to 1.5 millimetres (0.039 to 0.059 in) wide, ending with a hook at the apex. Flowering occurs from November to February and the flowers are strongly fragrant, white, cream or pink and arranged in groups of between 8 and 26. The groups are on a rachis 3–6.5 mm (0.12–0.26 in) long and covered with rust-coloured hairs. The rachis has thickly matted hairs or more or less raised short silky rusty coloured hairs, occasionally white hairs. The pedicels are 2.5–3 mm (0.098–0.118 in) long and scantily covered with mostly white flattened soft silky hairs. The perianth is 2.5–3 mm (0.098–0.118 in) long and pistil 7–7.5 mm (0.28–0.30 in) long. The smooth grey to black egg-shaped fruit are 19 to 23 mm (0.75 to 0.91 in) long and 7 to 13 mm (0.276 to 0.512 in) wide with a wide longish beak and short eroded horns. The light brown to grey-yellow seeds have a single wing down one side.

== Taxonomy and naming ==
The species was first formally described by the botanist Carl Meissner in 1855 in New Proteaceae of Australia as part of William Jackson Hooker's work Hooker's Journal of Botany and Kew Garden Miscellany. The specific epithet honours Richard Kippist, who was once the librarian of the Linnean Society and was particularly interested in Australian plants.

== Distribution and habitat ==
Hakea kippistiana is endemic to many scattered areas in the Wheatbelt and Goldfields–Esperance regions of Western Australia where it grows in red sandy soils around laterite.
