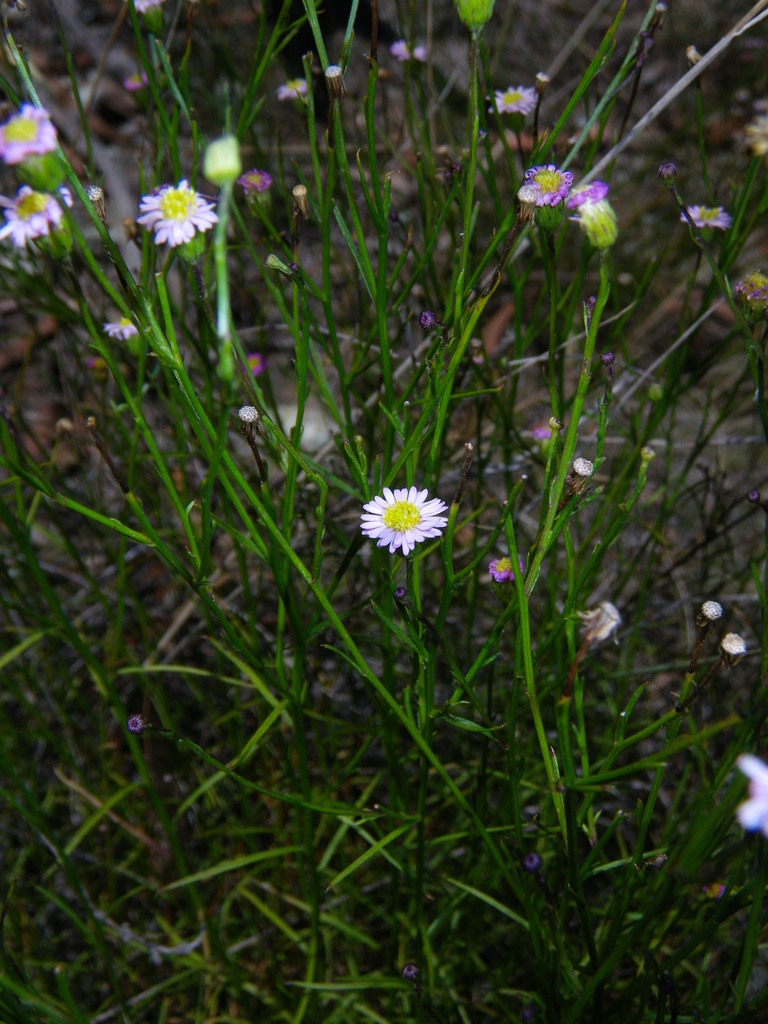

Scientific classification
- Kingdom: Plantae
- Clade: Tracheophytes
- Clade: Angiosperms
- Clade: Eudicots
- Clade: Asterids
- Order: Asterales
- Family: Asteraceae
- Genus: Minuria
- Species: M. scoparia

Binomial name
- Minuria scoparia P.S.Short & Hosking

= Minuria scoparia =

Species of herb

Minuria scoparia is a flowering plant in the family Asteraceae. It is a small stiff, broom-like, perennial herb with white flowers, which are seen most of the year. It is endemic to Australia and found only on the north-western slopes of New South Wales.

== Taxonomy and naming ==
Minuria scoparia was first formally described in 2000 by Philip Sydney Short and John Robert Hosking. The species epithet, scoparia, derives from the Latin scopa, meaning a slender twig and by extension broom and hence describes the plant as "broom-like".
