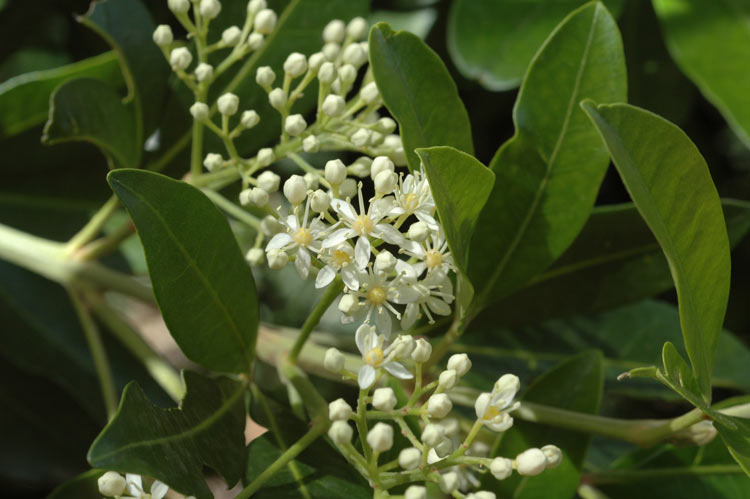
- Acradenia euodiiformis in the ANBG

Scientific classification
- Kingdom: Plantae
- Clade: Tracheophytes
- Clade: Angiosperms
- Clade: Eudicots
- Clade: Rosids
- Order: Sapindales
- Family: Rutaceae
- Subfamily: Zanthoxyloideae
- Genus: Acradenia; Kippist

Species
- Acradenia euodiiformis (F.Muell.) T.G.Hartley; Acradenia frankliniae Milligan ex Kippist

Synonyms
- Luerssenidendron Domin

= Acradenia =

Genus of flowering plants

Acradenia is a genus of two species of tree or shrub in the family Rutaceae and is endemic to Australia. These plants have leaves that are trifoliate, arranged in opposite pairs and flowers that have five sepals, five petals and usually ten stamens of unequal lengths.

== Description ==
Plants in the genus Acradenia are evergreen trees, sometimes shrubs with trifoliate leaves arranged in opposite pairs and lacking domatia. The flowers are arranged in panicles in leaf axils or on the ends of branchlets. The flowers are bisexual usually with five (rarely six) sepals and petals. The sepals are 1–1.5 mm (0.039–0.059 in) long, joined at the base and remain attached to the fruit. The petals overlap at the base and there are twice as many stamens as petals, usually alternating in length. There are usually five carpels in each ovary and two ovules in each locule. The fruit has up to five follicles joined at the base, each follicle with a single, smooth brown seed about 5 mm (0.20 in) long.

== Taxonomy ==
The genus Acradenia was first formally described in 1853 by Richard Kippist in the Proceedings of the Linnean Society of London and the first species described was A. frankliniae.

The closest relative to Acradenia is Crossosperma from New Caledonia.

=== Species ===
- Acradenia euodiiformis (F.Muell.) T.G.Hartley - yellow satinheart, bonewood (N.S.W., Qld.)
- Acradenia frankliniae Milligan ex Kippist - whitey wood, wirewood (Tas.).
