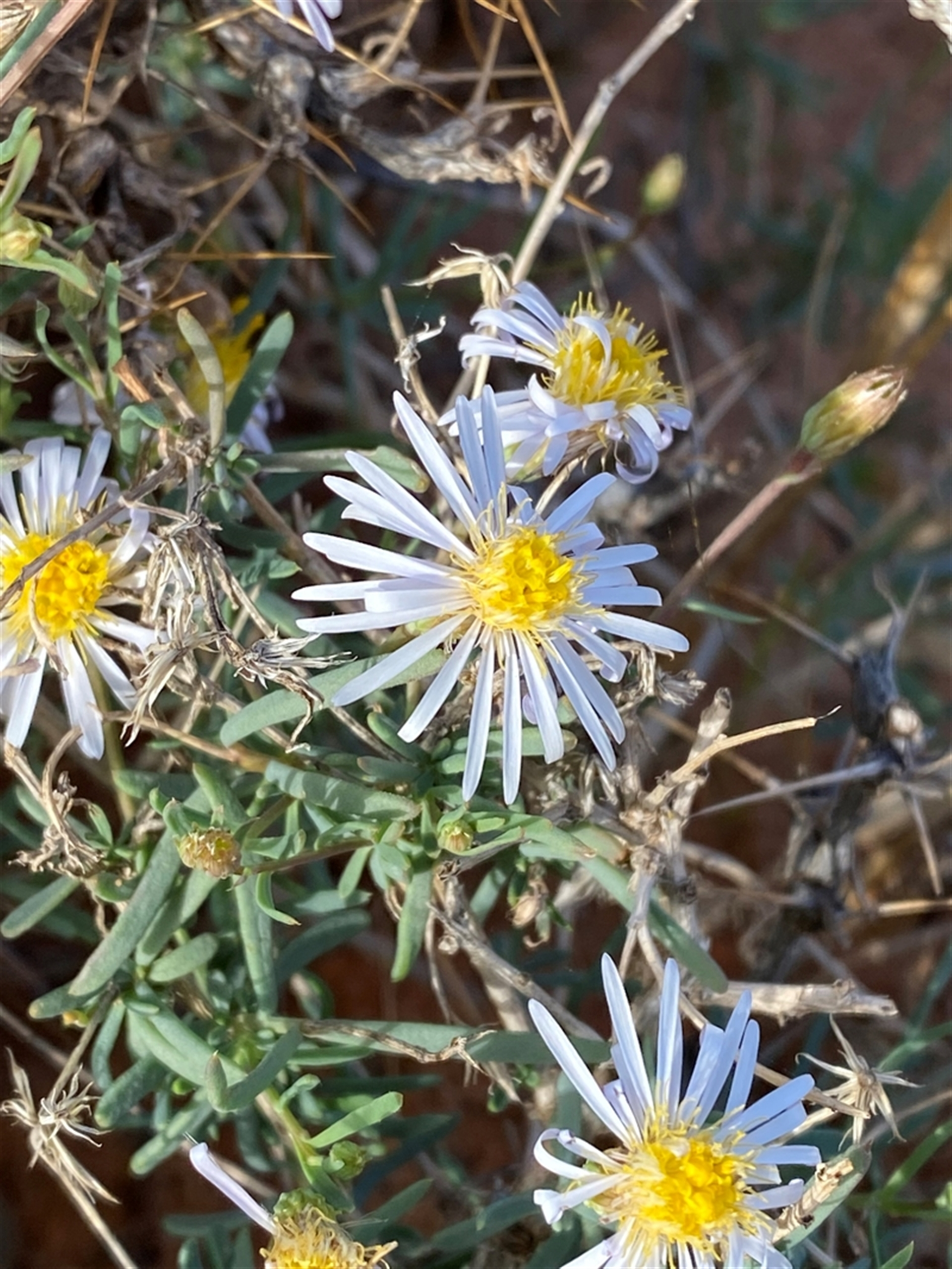

Scientific classification
- Kingdom: Plantae
- Clade: Tracheophytes
- Clade: Angiosperms
- Clade: Eudicots
- Clade: Asterids
- Order: Asterales
- Family: Asteraceae
- Genus: Minuria
- Species: M. cunninghamii

Binomial name
- Minuria cunninghamii (DC.) Benth.

= Minuria cunninghamii =

Bush minuria

Species of herb

Minuria cunninghamii commonly known as bush minuria, is a flowering plant in the family Asteraceae and grows on mainland Australia. It is a perennial shrub with white daisy-like flowers and a yellow centre.

== Description ==
Minuria cunninghamii is a perennial, spreading shrub to 1 m (3 ft 3 in) high, thin stems mostly smooth or with occasional simple hairs and woody at the base. Leaves are usually alternate, dark green, narrowly lance-shaped, 4 cm (1.6 in) long and 1–3 mm (0.039–0.118 in) wide. The solitary daisy-like flowers may be white, pink or mauve with a yellow centre and borne at the end of stems, inner bracts narrow lance-shaped, 2–8 mm (0.079–0.315 in) long, 0.5–0.8 mm (0.020–0.031 in) wide, outer bracts shorter, sometimes with sparse hairs and pointed. Flowering occurs from late summer to spring and the fruit is dry, one-seeded and bristly.

== Taxonomy and naming ==
This species was first described in 1836 by Augustin Pyramus de Candolle who gave it the name Edlachothamnos cunninghamii and the description published in Prodromus Systematis Naturalis Regni Vegetabilis. In 1867 George Bentham changed the name to Minuria cunninghamii and published the change in Flora Australiensis. The specific epithet (cunninghamii) is in honour of Allan Cunningham.

== Distribution and habitat ==
Bush minuria grows on sandy and clay soils, flood plains, sand dunes and shrubland in New South Wales, Victoria, Queensland, Western Australia, South Australia and the Northern Territory.
