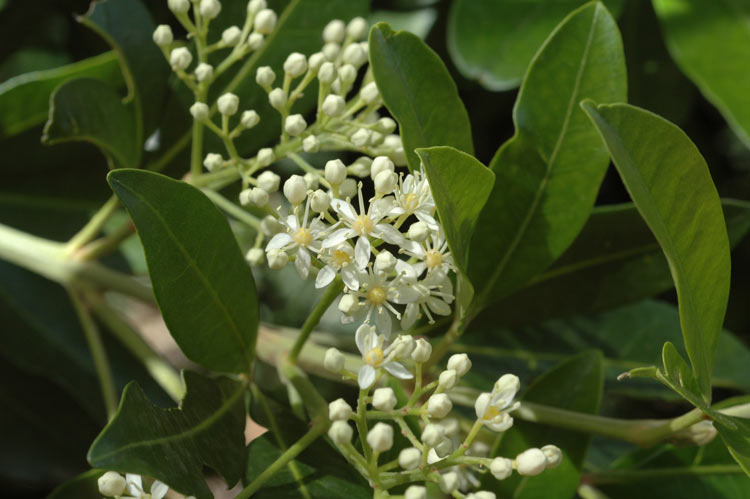
- In Australian National Botanic Gardens

Scientific classification
- Kingdom: Plantae
- Clade: Tracheophytes
- Clade: Angiosperms
- Clade: Eudicots
- Clade: Rosids
- Order: Sapindales
- Family: Rutaceae
- Genus: Acradenia
- Species: A. euodiiformis

Binomial name
- Acradenia euodiiformis (T.Hartley) F.Muell.

Synonyms
- Acradenia euodiformis K.A.W.Williams orth. var.; Bosistoa euodiiformis F.Muell.; Bosistoa evodiiformis F.Muell. orth. var.; Luerssenidendron monostylis Domin

= Acradenia euodiiformis =

Yellow satinheart

Species of tree

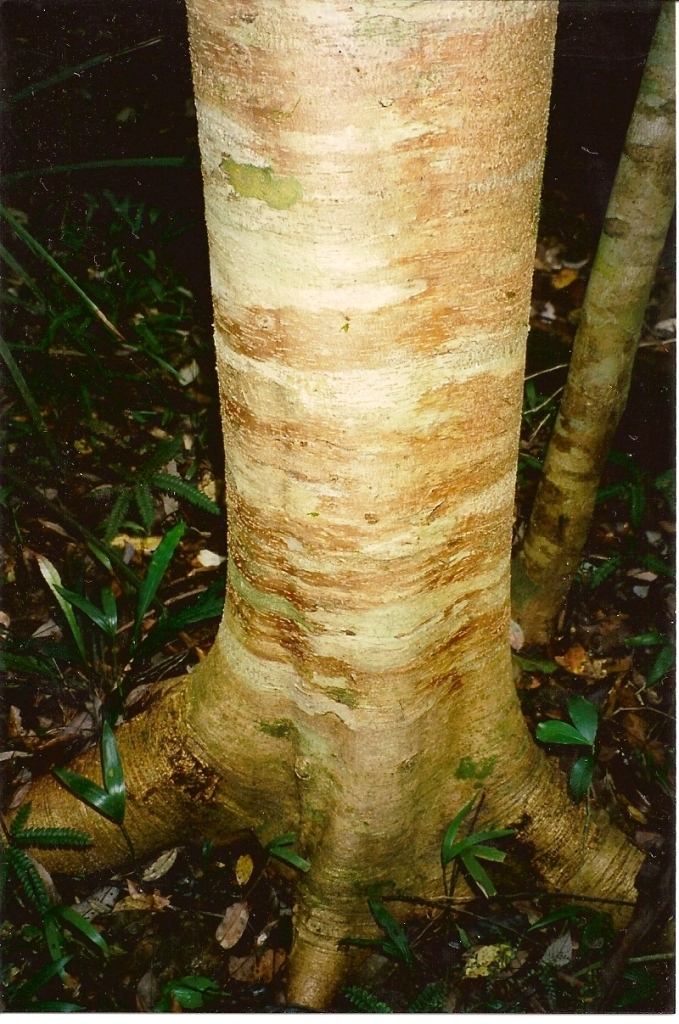
Trunk in Coorabakh National Park

Acradenia euodiiformis, commonly known as yellow satinheart or bonewood, is a species of tree that is endemic to eastern Australia. It has mostly trifoliate leaves, the leaflets narrow elliptic to lance-shaped, with prominent oil glands, and panicles of white flowers. It grows in and near rainforest.

== Description ==
Acradenia euodiiformis is a tree that typically grows to a height of 12–30 m (39–98 ft) with stems up to 60 cm (24 in) in diameter. The trunk is usually irregular in shape, rarely cylindrical, sometimes with several stems. The bark is creamy, usually smooth, somewhat corky with vertical lines of pustules. The outer surface of live bark is in patterns of red and cream. The leaves are arranged in opposite pairs and are trifoliate (occasionally with two or five leaflets), the leaflets mostly 50–180 mm (2–7 in) long and 15–50 mm (0.6–2 in) wide, the leaf on a petiole 20–70 mm (0.8–3 in) long and the leaflets on petiolules 3–10 mm (0.1–0.4 in) long. The leaflets are glabrous and have prominent, large oil glands. The flowers are arranged in panicles 60–210 mm (2–8 in) long, the sepals 1–1.5 mm (0.04–0.06 in) long and hairy, the petals white or cream-coloured, 3.5–5.5 mm (0.1–0.2 in) long with woolly hairs. Flowers appear from September to January, followed by fruit that mature in January and are follicles 6–8 mm (0.2–0.3 in) long and ribbed.

== Taxonomy ==
Yellow satinheart was first formally described in 1875 by Ferdinand von Mueller in Fragmenta phytographiae Australiae. Mueller gave it the name Bosistoa euodiiformis from specimens collected near the Clarence River by Mary Anne Wilcox. In 1977, Thomas Gordon Hartley changed the name to Acradenia euodiiformis in the Journal of the Arnold Arboretum.

== Distribution and habitat ==
Acrodenia euodiiformis grows in and on the margins of rainforest and is found naturally from the McPherson Range in south-eastern Queensland to the Hunter River in New South Wales at altitudes of 60–1,200 m (200–3,940 ft). It is often seen in rainforests as an understorey tree, particularly on poorer sedimentary soils and along creeks, but sometimes on the more fertile basaltic soils and at relatively high altitudes.
