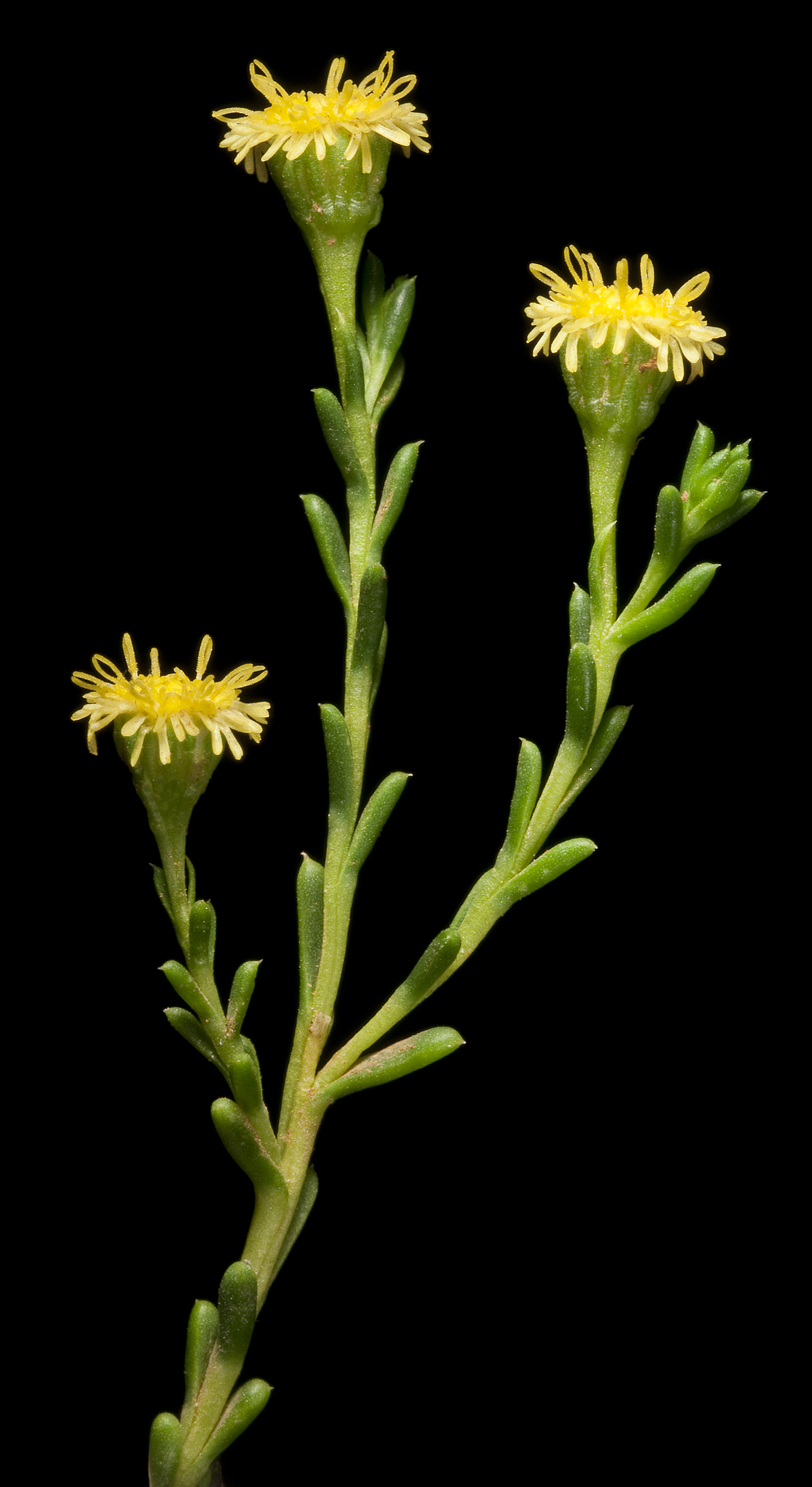

Scientific classification
- Kingdom: Plantae
- Clade: Tracheophytes
- Clade: Angiosperms
- Clade: Eudicots
- Clade: Asterids
- Order: Asterales
- Family: Asteraceae
- Subfamily: Asteroideae
- Tribe: Astereae
- Subtribe: Brachyscominae
- Genus: Kippistia; F.Muell. 1858 not Miers 1872 (Celastraceae)
- Species: K. suaedifolia

Binomial name
- Kippistia suaedifolia F.Muell.
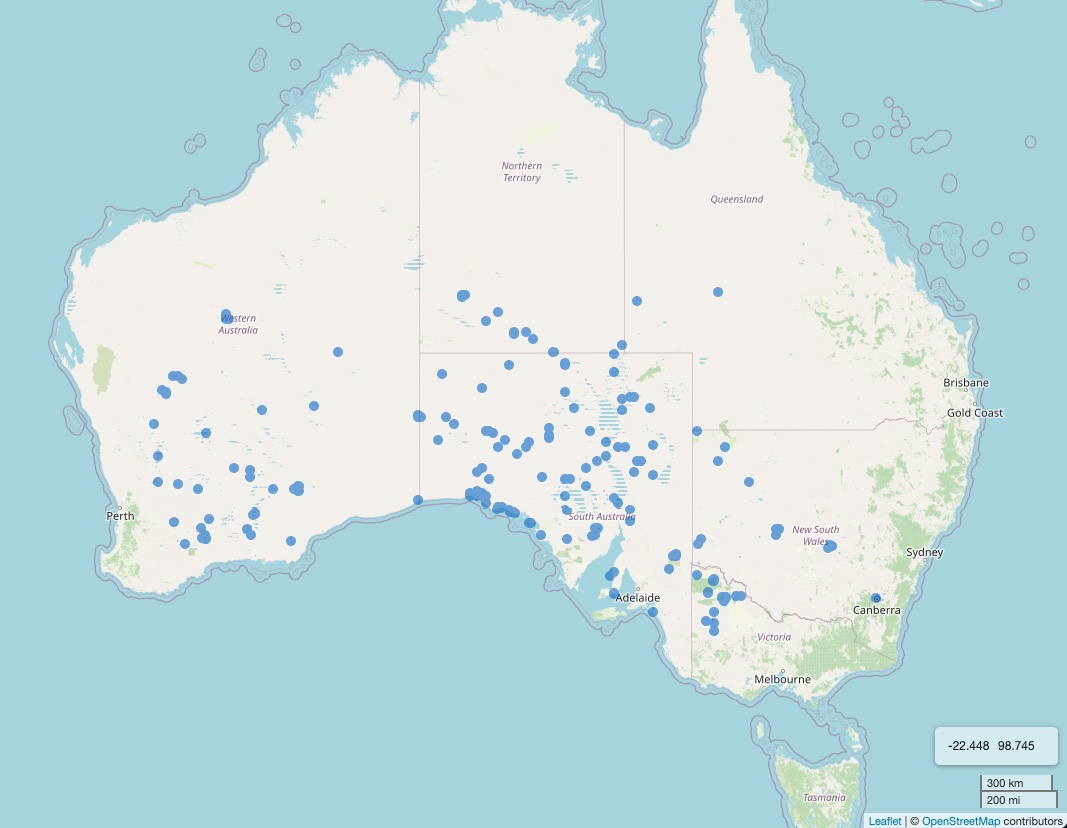
- Map showing the distribution of Kippistia suaedifolia across the Australian continent (Atlas of Living Australia, 2023).

Synonyms
- Minuria suaedifolia (F.Muell.) Bailey; Theropogon suaedifolia (F.Muell.) Kuntze

= Kippistia =

Genus of flowering plants

Kippistia is a genus of flowering plants in the family Asteraceae. The name commemorates Richard Kippist, librarian to the Linnean Society.

There is only one known species, Kippistia suaedifolia, native to Australia. It is found in every state and territory in the country except Tasmania.

== Description ==
Kippistia suaedifolia is small shrub growing to 60 cm (24 in). It is dense with many wiry branches. Leaves are succulent and without hair, from 0.2 to 2.5 cm (0.079 to 0.984 in) long, straight and sometimes cylindrical with a curved point at the tip. The single yellow bell-shaped flowers at the ends of stems, as other daisy flowers, are made up of disc florets and ray florets. The achenes or fruit of the ray florets have hairs at the base, those of the disc florets do not.

== Taxonomy ==
Although Kippistia is currently considered a monotypic taxon, in 1872, John Miers used the same name to describe some South American plants in the Celastraceae. Miers was aware that Ferdinand von Mueller had already applied the name to some very different Australian plants. Therefore, Miers' names needed to be changed:

- Kippistia cognata Miers - Cheiloclinium cognatum (Miers) A.C.Sm.
- Kippistia diffusiflora Miers - Cheiloclinium diffusiflorum (Miers) A.C.Sm.
- Kippistia organensis Miers - Cheiloclinium serratum (Cambess.) A.C.Sm.
- Kippistia serrata (Cambess.) Miers - Cheiloclinium serratum (Cambess.) A.C.Sm.

== Distribution ==
The species is widespread across South Australia and Inland in Western Australia from central regions to the South. In Victoria north from Dimboola and chiefly to the West of Salt Lake. In the Northern Territory south of Alice Springs and to the south and west of Mount Windsor Station in Queensland. In New South Wales to the West and North-West of Weelah Forest (Condobolan area). There are also several records near Conoble in the Ivanhoe Distsrict.

== Ecology ==
Kippistia suaedifolia flowers from August to November and is usually fairly abundant in the populations where it is found. The species is generally found around salt lakes and in depressions on gypsum and on gypsum outcrops. K. suaedifolia is thought to be an obligate Gypsophile, favouring sites with high purity of gypsum deposits over sites where the quality of the gypsum is considered poor.

== Uses ==
Essential oils distilled from K. suaedifolia are perillyl acetate and limonene. Perillyl acetate is used in food flavouring and the perfume industry. Limonene is also used as flavouring and in the perfume industry. It is also used in cosmetics
