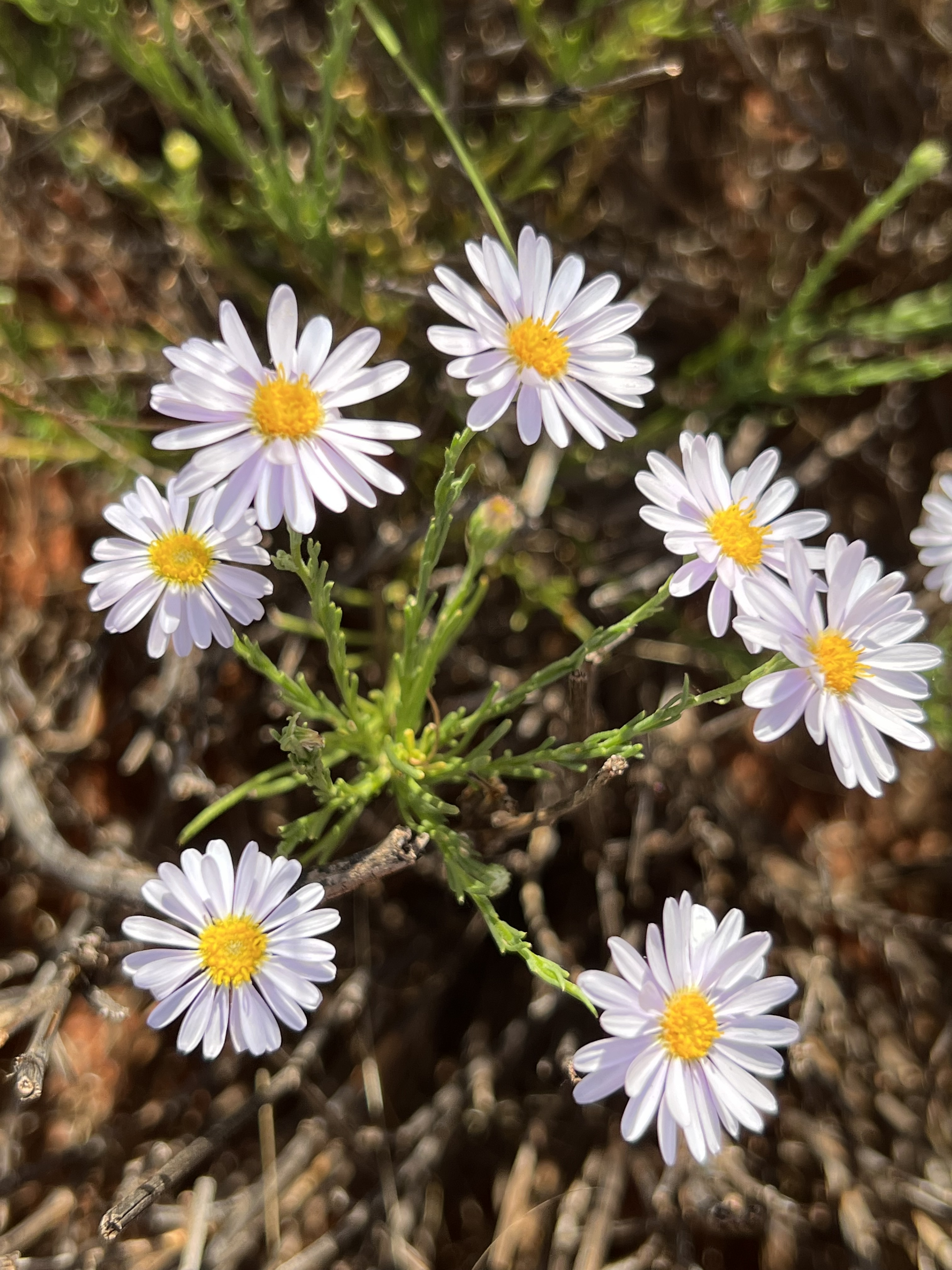

Scientific classification
- Kingdom: Plantae
- Clade: Embryophytes
- Clade: Tracheophytes
- Clade: Spermatophytes
- Clade: Angiosperms
- Clade: Eudicots
- Clade: Asterids
- Order: Asterales
- Family: Asteraceae
- Genus: Minuria
- Species: M. leptophylla

Binomial name
- Minuria leptophylla DC.

= Minuria leptophylla =

Species of plant

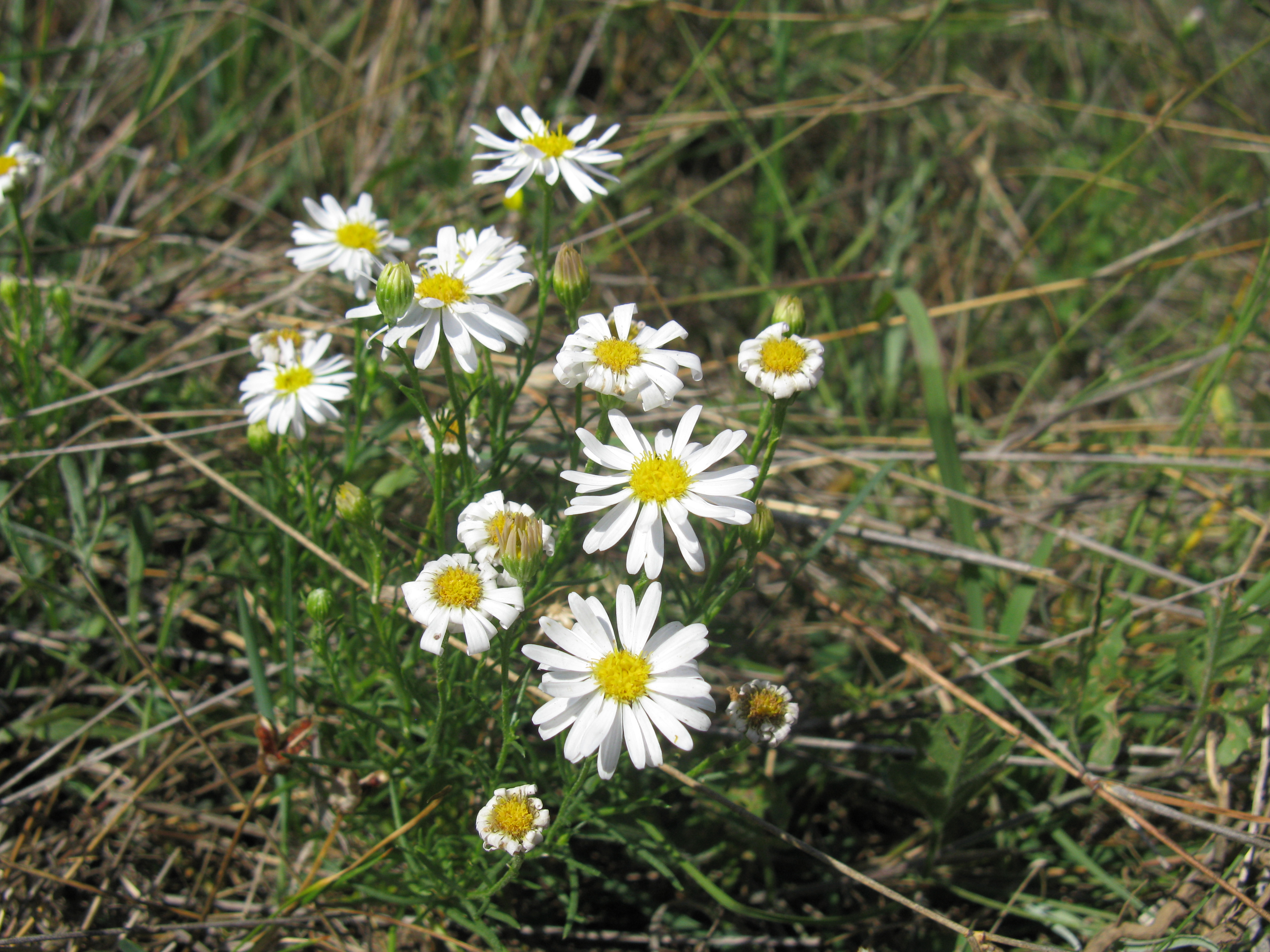
M. leptophylla growing in its natural habitat

Minuria leptophylla, commonly known as minnie daisy, is a species of flowering plant in the family Asteraceae endemic to mainland Australia. It is a perennial herb with white to pale lilac daisy-like flower heads and occurs throughout arid and semi-arid inland regions of Australia. The species grows in woodland, shrubland, grassland and mallee vegetation communities on a variety of soil types and is widely distributed across the Australian mainland.

Minuria leptophylla is the type species of the Australian genus Minuria, a group of daisies primarily associated with inland arid environments. The species was first formally described by the Swiss botanist Augustin Pyramus de Candolle in 1836 and has since been the subject of taxonomic revisions and phylogenetic studies examining relationships within the tribe Astereae.

The species is characterised by its narrow linear leaves, solitary flower heads, white to pale lilac ray florets and distinctive cypselas bearing pappus bristles that aid seed dispersal. It is adapted to the dry conditions of inland Australia and is commonly found on loamy and clay-based soils. Although widespread, populations have declined in some regions, particularly in parts of Victoria where agricultural development and clearing of native vegetation have reduced suitable habitat.

== Description ==
Minuria leptophylla is a perennial herb typically growing to 20–50 cm (7.9–19.7 in) high and branching near the base. The species commonly exhibits a decumbent to ascending growth habit, although erect forms occasionally occur. Plants are generally sparsely hairy when young, with stems becoming progressively smoother as they mature.

The stems and peduncles are sparsely covered with simple hairs and eventually become glabrous with age. Leaves are narrow, linear and entire, measuring approximately 5–40 mm (0.20–1.57 in) long and 0.5–1 mm (0.020–0.039 in) wide. The leaf surfaces range from sparsely pubescent to almost hairless, while the apex is acute and the margins remain smooth along their entire length. The narrow leaves are characteristic of many inland Australian daisies and are well suited to the dry environments in which the species commonly occurs.

Flower heads are borne singly at the ends of branches and are characteristic of members of the daisy family, Asteraceae. Each flower head consists of white to pale lilac ray florets surrounding numerous central disc florets. The ligules of the ray florets are approximately 4–9 mm (0.16–0.35 in) long, while the disc florets possess glabrous corolla tubes measuring 2.8–4 mm (0.11–0.16 in) in length. Flowering has been recorded throughout the year across parts of the species' range, although flowering is most commonly observed during winter and spring.

The involucre is composed of several rows of bracts, with the inner bracts narrowly obovate and possessing broad membranous margins. The outer bracts are generally smaller and narrower than the inner bracts. These structures protect the developing florets before flowering and are important diagnostic features used in the identification of species within the genus.

The fruit is a small dry cypsela containing a single seed. Ray cypselas are obovate and densely silky-pubescent, whereas disc cypselas are linear and glabrous. Numerous pappus bristles are attached to the cypselas and assist in seed dispersal, most likely by wind. Chromosome counts of the species have recorded a haploid chromosome number of n = 9, a characteristic used in taxonomic studies of the genus.

== Taxonomy and naming ==
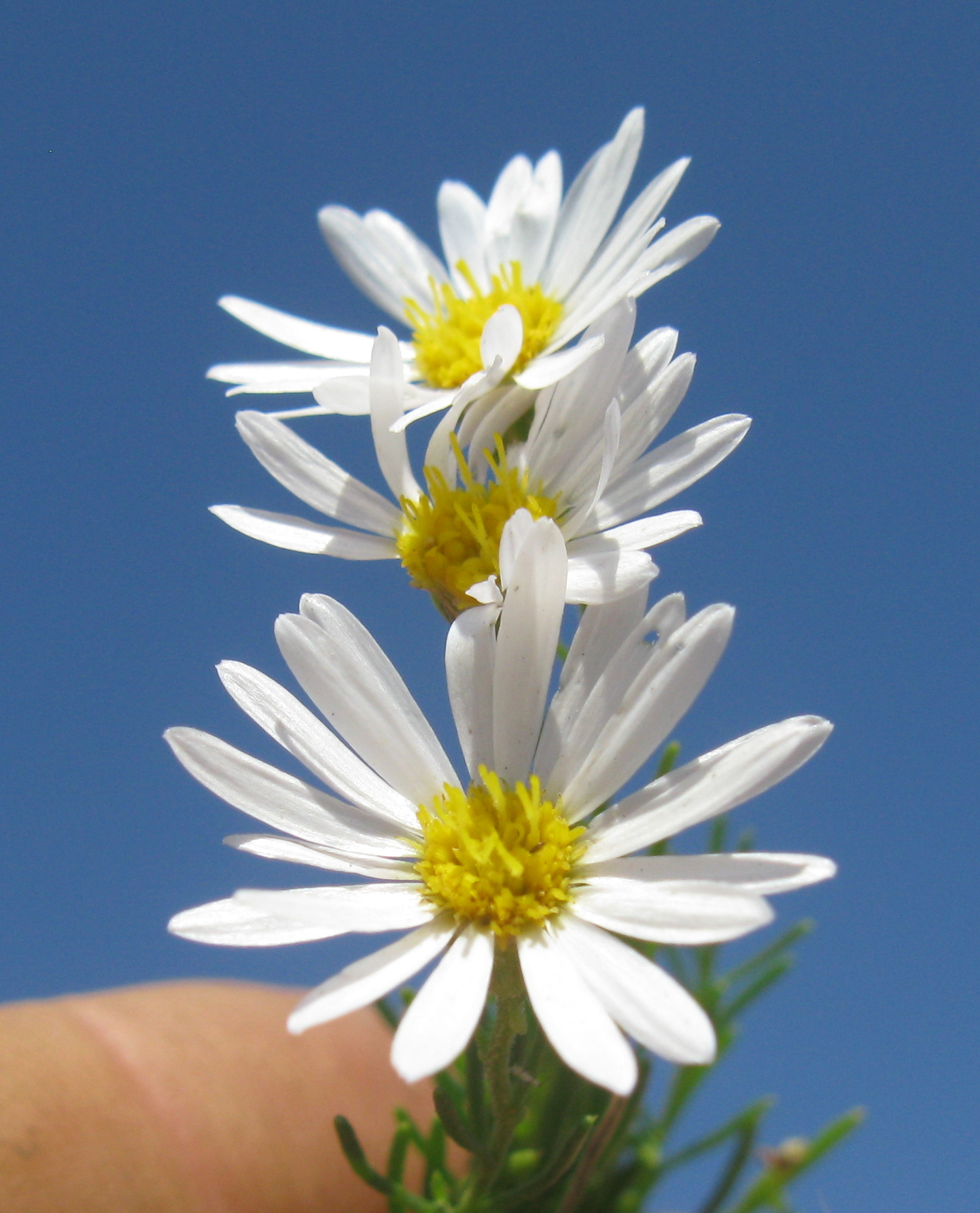
M. leptophylla - white flower heads

Minuria leptophylla was first formally described in 1836 by the Swiss botanist Augustin Pyramus de Candolle in Volume 5 of Prodromus Systematis Naturalis Regni Vegetabilis, a major nineteenth-century work that sought to classify all known plant species. The species remains the accepted name recognised by the Australian Plant Census and the Australian Plant Name Index. The genus Minuria belongs to the tribe Astereae within the family Asteraceae, one of the largest families of flowering plants. Species within the genus are predominantly Australian and are most commonly associated with arid and semi-arid inland environments. M. leptophylla is recognised as the type species of the genus, meaning it serves as the principal reference species upon which the name and diagnostic characteristics of Minuria are based.

The specific epithet leptophylla is derived from the Greek words leptos, meaning "slender" or "thin", and phyllon, meaning "leaf". The name refers to the species' narrow linear leaves, a characteristic feature that distinguishes it from many other members of the daisy family and reflects its adaptation to dry inland environments.

A major revision of the genus was undertaken by Lander and Barry in 1980, who reviewed species boundaries, morphology and cytology across Minuria. Their study confirmed the distinct status of M. leptophylla and provided detailed descriptions of its floral structures, fruit characteristics and chromosome number. The revision also highlighted the importance of cypsela morphology, pappus structure and reproductive characters in distinguishing species within the genus.

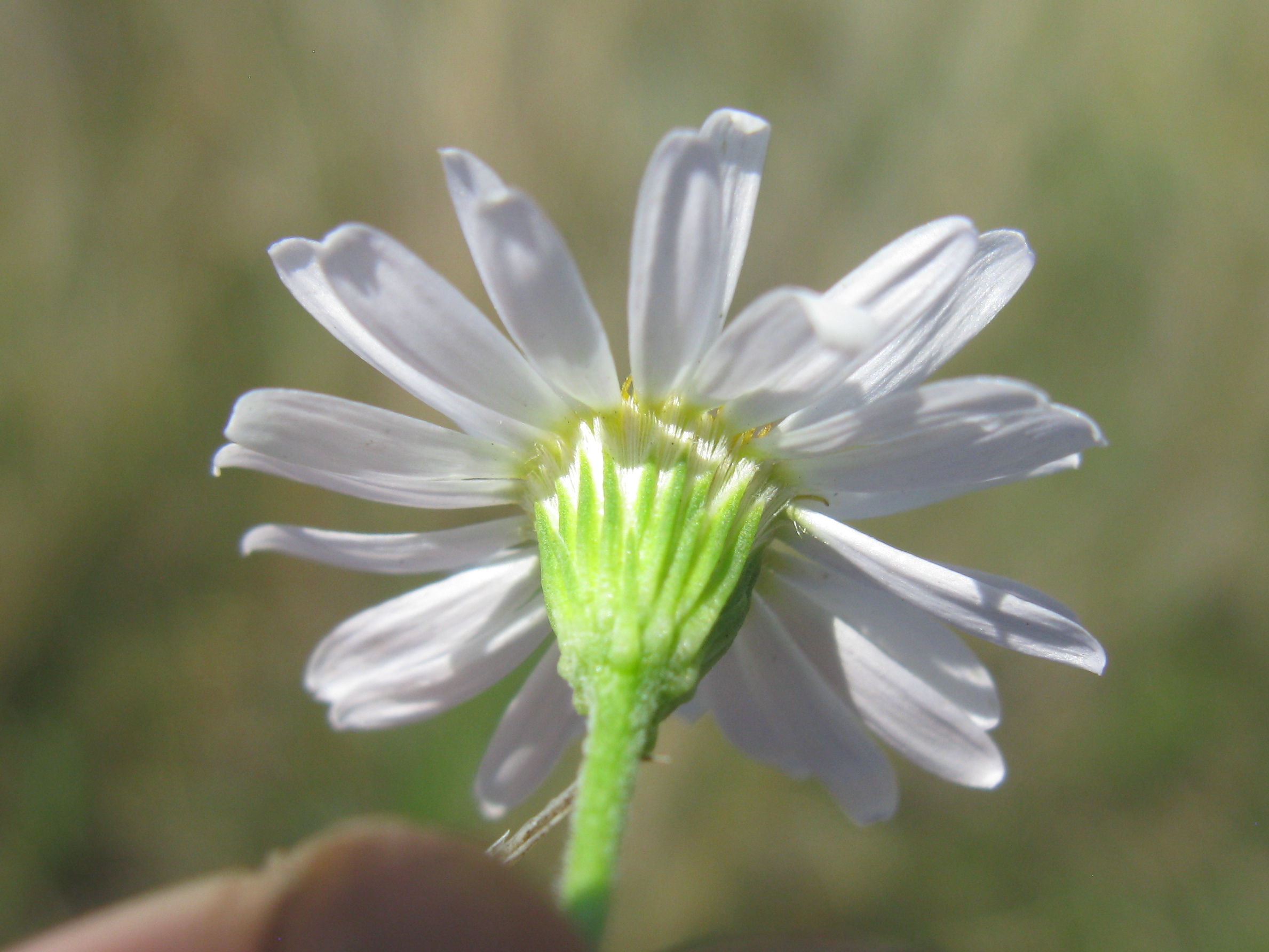
Flower head of M. leptophylla showing white ray florets surrounding yellow disc florets

More recent molecular and phylogenetic studies have improved understanding of relationships within the tribe Astereae. Research by Short and colleagues demonstrated that Australian members of the Astereae form several distinct evolutionary lineages and provided new insights into relationships among species historically placed within Minuria and related genera. These studies support the view that the Australian daisy flora has undergone extensive diversification in response to the continent's changing climates and increasing aridity over millions of years.

The taxonomic history of M. leptophylla reflects broader developments in Australian botany, from nineteenth-century morphological classification to modern phylogenetic approaches that combine molecular, morphological and biogeographical evidence to better understand species relationships and evolution within the Asteraceae.

== Distribution and habitat ==
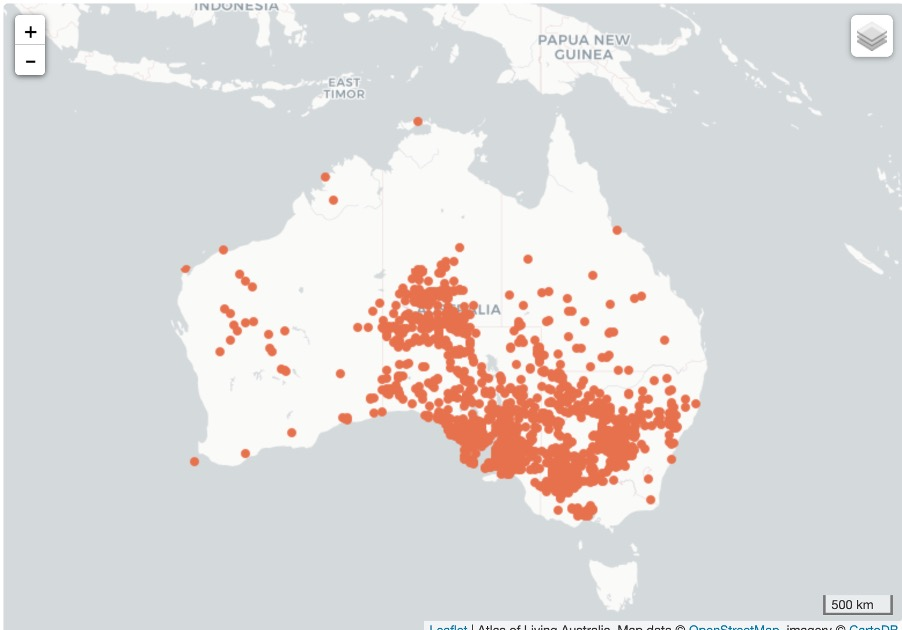
Distribution records of M. leptophylla across mainland Australia based on Atlas of Living Australia occurrence data

Minuria leptophylla is widely distributed across mainland Australia and has been recorded in all Australian states except Tasmania. The species occurs throughout much of inland Australia, particularly within arid and semi-arid regions where it forms part of diverse native plant communities adapted to low and variable rainfall.

In New South Wales, the species occurs west of the Great Dividing Range and has been recorded across a broad range of inland bioregions. Herbarium records indicate that it is widespread throughout central and western parts of the state, occurring from woodland and shrubland communities to more open grassland habitats. Similar distributions have been documented in Victoria, South Australia, Western Australia, Queensland and the Northern Territory.

The species occupies a variety of vegetation types including low shrublands, sclerophyll woodlands, open forests, native grasslands and mallee communities. It is commonly associated with open habitats where competition from taller vegetation is limited and where periodic disturbance may create opportunities for recruitment and establishment.

Minuria leptophylla grows on a wide range of soil types including loams, sandy loams and light clay soils. The species appears tolerant of relatively infertile soils and is well adapted to the environmental conditions characteristic of inland Australia, including seasonal drought, high temperatures and irregular rainfall patterns.

Within Victoria, the species was historically more common in grassland communities between Melbourne and Geelong. However, extensive agricultural development and land clearing have resulted in the loss and fragmentation of many native grassland habitats, leading to local declines in abundance. Despite these regional reductions, M. leptophylla remains widespread across much of its Australian range and continues to occur in numerous inland vegetation communities.

The broad distribution of M. leptophylla reflects its ecological adaptability and ability to persist across a range of environmental conditions. Its occurrence in multiple vegetation types and across diverse climatic zones demonstrates the resilience of many Australian inland daisy species and their capacity to occupy habitats ranging from semi-arid shrublands to temperate woodland ecosystems.

== Ecology ==
Minuria leptophylla is a perennial species adapted to the arid and semi-arid environments of inland Australia. Its growth form and narrow leaves are considered advantageous in regions characterised by seasonal drought, high summer temperatures and irregular rainfall. The reduced leaf surface area may assist in limiting water loss, a common adaptation among many inland Australian plant species.

Flowering has been recorded throughout the year, although it is most commonly observed during winter and spring when environmental conditions are favourable for growth and reproduction. The conspicuous white to pale lilac ray florets surrounding the central disc florets are likely to attract a variety of insect pollinators, as is typical of many members of the family Asteraceae.

Following pollination, the species produces dry fruits known as cypselas, each containing a single seed. The cypselas possess numerous pappus bristles that facilitate dispersal by wind, enabling seeds to be transported away from the parent plant and increasing opportunities for colonisation of suitable habitat. Wind dispersal is particularly advantageous in open inland landscapes where vegetation cover is often sparse.

The species occurs within a variety of woodland, shrubland and grassland communities and contributes to the diversity of native ground-layer vegetation across much of inland Australia. As a perennial herb, M. leptophylla can persist through unfavourable periods and respond rapidly to rainfall events, an important characteristic for plants inhabiting environments where climatic conditions can be highly variable from year to year.

Like many native daisies, M. leptophylla forms part of the ecological fabric of inland ecosystems by providing floral resources for insects and contributing to plant community diversity. Its broad distribution and adaptability demonstrate the resilience of many Australian arid-zone species to environmental variability and disturbance.

== Phytochemistry ==
Phytochemical investigations of M. leptophylla have identified a range of secondary metabolites characteristic of members of the family Asteraceae. These compounds include flavonoids and sesquiterpene derivatives, which are commonly found in many daisy species and may play important roles in plant defence, environmental adaptation and interactions with herbivores and microorganisms.

Jakupovic and colleagues examined the chemical constituents of several Australian members of the Astereae and found that M. leptophylla possessed distinctive chemical profiles that could assist in understanding relationships among species and genera within the tribe. Such studies have contributed to the field of chemotaxonomy, which uses naturally occurring chemical compounds as an additional source of evidence in plant classification.

The chemical composition of M. leptophylla supports morphological and taxonomic studies that place the species within a distinct Australian lineage of the Astereae. Although the ecological functions of many of these compounds remain poorly understood, secondary metabolites are thought to contribute to protection against herbivory, environmental stress and pathogen attack.

Phytochemical research continues to complement traditional taxonomic approaches by providing additional information on evolutionary relationships and species differentiation within the diverse Australian daisy flora.

== Conservation and threats ==
Although M. leptophylla remains widespread across much of mainland Australia, populations have declined in some regions as a result of habitat loss and land-use change. In Victoria, the species was formerly more common in native grasslands between Melbourne and Geelong, but extensive agricultural development and urban expansion have resulted in the clearing and fragmentation of many of these habitats.

The conversion of native vegetation to cropping, grazing and urban land uses has reduced the extent of suitable habitat available for many grassland and woodland plant species. Habitat fragmentation can also isolate populations, potentially reducing opportunities for dispersal and genetic exchange between populations. These pressures have affected numerous native herbs and daisies associated with south-eastern Australian grasslands.

Despite these localised declines, M. leptophylla remains broadly distributed across inland Australia and occurs in a variety of woodland, shrubland and grassland communities. Its wide geographic range and ecological adaptability have contributed to its continued persistence across much of its natural distribution. Ongoing conservation of native vegetation remnants and the protection of intact grassland and woodland ecosystems are likely to benefit the long-term persistence of the species and the diverse plant communities in which it occurs.
