= Richard Kippist =

English botanist and librarian (1812–1882)

Richard Kippist (11 June 1812 – 14 January 1882) was an English botanist and librarian.

== Life ==
Kippist was born in Stoke Newington, London, on 11 June 1812. He worked as a clerk in the office of Joseph Woods, F.L.S., architect, with whom he shared an interest in botany. He was employed by the Linnean Society from 1830, holding the position of librarian from 1842 to 1881. His special interest was Australian flora, and he advised George Bentham, Ferdinand von Mueller and others on this subject.

His published works include "On Jansonia, a new genus of Leguminosae from Western Australia" and "On Acradenia, a new genus of Diosmae" in the Transactions of the society, describing the genera Jansonia (Gastrolobium) and Acradenia. He assisted with the editing of Wood's The Tourists Flora, published in 1830. His important papers include one on the discovery of spiral cells in the seeds of the family Acanthaceae. Kippist was a founding member of The Microscopical Society of London and associate of the Royal Botanical Society, Regent's Park.

Kippist died in Chelsea, London, on 14 January 1882, notices of his life appeared Proceedings of the society. The names of the genus Kippistia and species Banksia kippistiana and Hakea kippistiana commemorate his contribution to Australian botany.
