= Corkwood =

Corkwood is a common name of a number of plants:

- Ackama paniculosa, a soft barked corkwood from Australia in the coachwood family
- Annona glabra, found in the West Indies
- Commiphora angolensis (sand corkwood), a shrub mainly in Angola and Namibia
- Commiphora saxicola (rock corkwood), a shrub endemic to Namibia
- Duboisia, a genus with species in Australia
- Endiandra sieberi, a corkwood from Australia in the laurel family
- Entelea arborescens, found in New Zealand
- Erythrina vespertilio (grey corkwood), Australia
- Hakea divaricata, found in Australia
- Hakea ivoryi, Australia
- Hakea suberea, Australia
- Leitneria floridana, southeastern North America
- Melicope, a genus with species in Australia
- Musanga cecropioides (African corkwood), Africa
- Sesbania grandiflora, southeast Asia and northern Australia, with edible flowers
- Stillingia aquatica, woody shrub that grows in the southeastern United States
