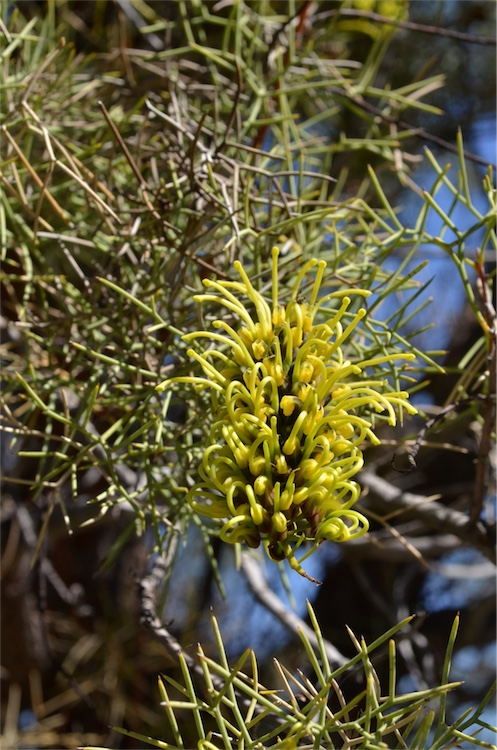
- Hakea divaricata near Alice Springs

Scientific classification
- Kingdom: Plantae
- Clade: Tracheophytes
- Clade: Angiosperms
- Clade: Eudicots
- Order: Proteales
- Family: Proteaceae
- Genus: Hakea
- Species: H. divaricata

Binomial name
- Hakea divaricata L.A.S.Johnson
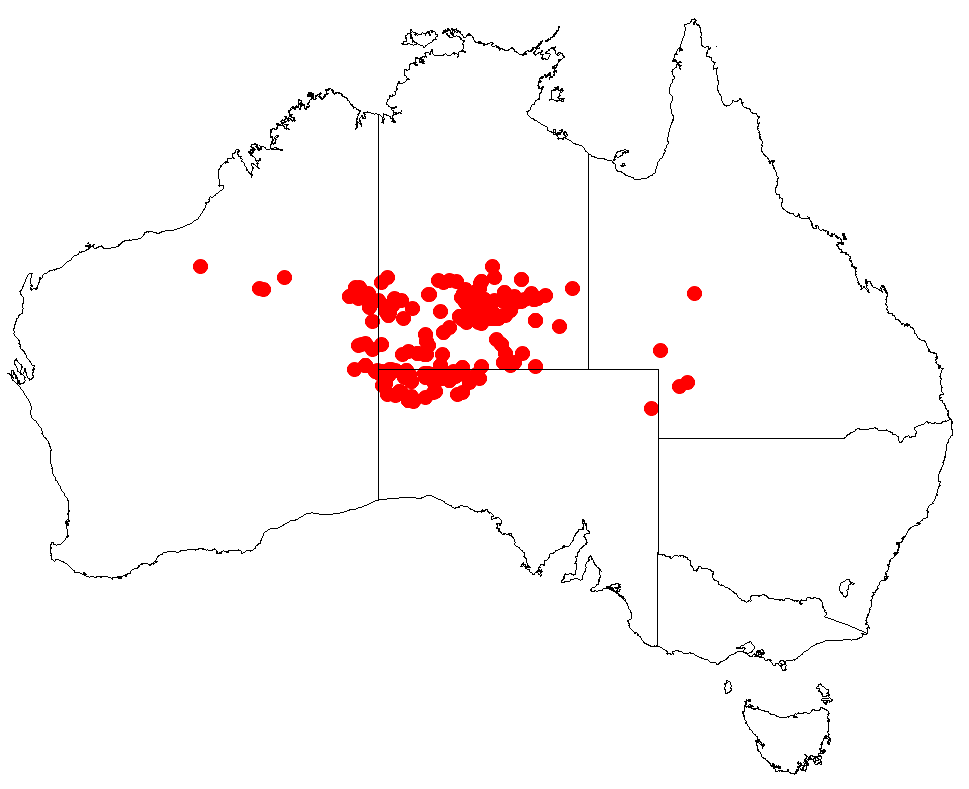
- Occurrence data from AVH

= Hakea divaricata =

Needlewood

Species of plant native to central Australia

Hakea divaricata, commonly known as needlewood, corkbark tree or fork-leaved corkwood, is a tree or shrub in the family Proteaceae native to an area in central Australia. A slow growing species with up to 120 showy cream to greenish-yellow flowers in long racemes from June to November.

The Alyawarr peoples know the plant as ntywey-arrengk, the Eastern Arrernte as untyeye and the Western Arrernteas ntyweye. The Kaytetye know it as ntyarleyarle or ntyeye, the Pintupi Luritja as piruwa, the Pitjantjatjara as piruwa or ularama and the Warlpiri as kumpalpa, piriwa or yarrkampi.

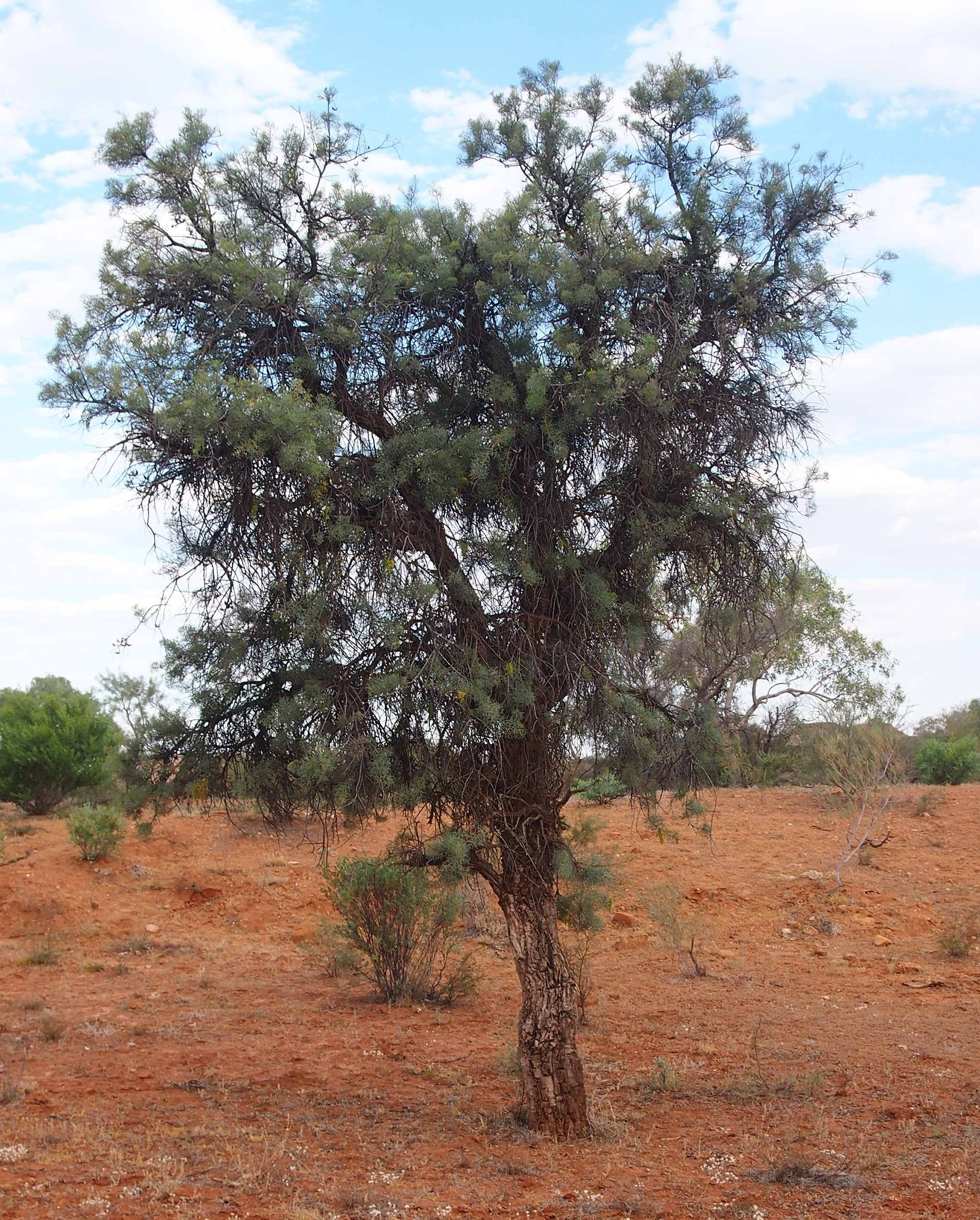
Hakea divaricata habit

== Description ==
Hakea divaricata is lignotuberous upright shrub or tree typically growing to 2 to 7 metres (6.6 to 23.0 ft) high with a dark coloured corky furrowed trunk. Smaller branches are red and smooth, on occasion sparsely or densely covered in soft short hairs. The prickly compound leaves are rigid, arranged alternately and are 7 to 20 centimetres (2.8 to 7.9 in) long and 0.8 to 2.3 millimetres (0.03 to 0.09 in) wide ending a sharp point. They are thinly covered with soft hairs quickly becoming smooth. Most leaves divide from a needle-shaped leaf stem 2.5–9 cm (0.98–3.5 in) long into segments 0.3–12 cm (0.12–4.7 in) long and 0.8–2.3 mm (0.031–0.091 in) wide. The inflorescence is on a stem 5–14 cm (2.0–5.5 in) long and consists of 65-120 cream, greenish-yellow or bright yellow flowers each on a stalk 4 to 10 millimetres (0.2 to 0.4 in) long. The stems are covered in white or dark brown hairs, rarely smooth. The hairy perianth is 5.5 to 9 millimetres (0.22 to 0.35 in) long. The style is more or less straight or slightly recurved and 21–26 mm (0.83–1.0 in) long. The fruit are oblong to egg-shaped 2.3 to 4 cm (0.91 to 1.57 in) long with a long tapering beak sometimes curved. The seeds inside take up much of the valve and have a wing halfway down one side.

== Taxonomy ==
Hakea divaricata was first formally described by the botanist Lawrence Alexander Sidney Johnson in 1962 and published in Contributions from the New South Wales National Herbarium. The species was often thought to be Hakea eyreana. Synonyms include; Hakea intermedia, Hakea ivoryi and Hakea ivoryi var. glabrescens. Hakea divaricata belongs to the corkwood group which are often found in drier areas of Australia. Other members include Hakea chordophylla, Hakea ednieana, Hakea eyreana, Hakea fraseri, Hakea ivoryi and Hakea pulvinifera. The specific epithet (divaricata) is derived from the Latin word divaricatus meaning "spread apart", referring to the spreading of the segments of the leaves.

== Distribution and habitat ==
The needlewood hakea is mostly found in the south of the Northern Territory, the Pilbara and northern Goldfields of Western Australia, south west Queensland and the Far North of South Australia. It is found on red sand plains, around bases of hills and rockholes, on dune swales and along watercourses and grows well in sandy soils around sandstone or limestone. It is often part of open woodland communities, especially mulga woodlands, and chenopod rich plains.

== Uses in horticulture ==
Hakea divaricata is planted as an ornamental or street tree and is particularly suited to arid areas as it is both frost and drought tolerant. The needlewood hakea is able to resprout epicormically from the lignotuber following fire. Indigenous Australian peoples have used the plant as a food source especially the fruit flesh, the roots are used as a water source. The gum can be extracted from the tree and the wood used to make weapons, implements and traps. They also extracted honey from the flowers or soaked the flowers in water to produce a sweet drink.
