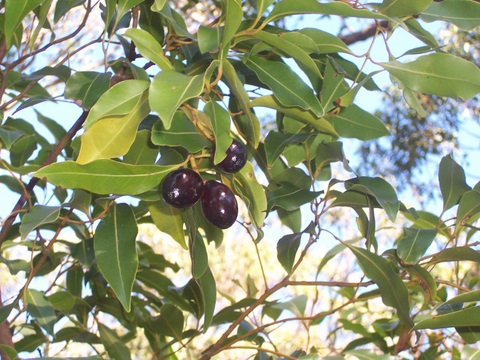
- Corkwood growing at Wyrrabalong National Park, Australia

Conservation status
- Least Concern (IUCN 3.1)

Scientific classification
- Kingdom: Plantae
- Clade: Tracheophytes
- Clade: Angiosperms
- Clade: Magnoliids
- Order: Laurales
- Family: Lauraceae
- Genus: Endiandra
- Species: E. sieberi

Binomial name
- Endiandra sieberi Nees

= Endiandra sieberi =

Species of tree

Endiandra sieberi, known as the corkwood is a rainforest tree growing in eastern Australia.

== Habitat ==
A common tree on lowland and some mountain rainforests. Very common on sand in littoral rainforests. The corky bark assists in protection from fire. It grows from Kioloa (35° S) near Batemans Bay in southern New South Wales to the islands of Moreton Bay (27° S), in south eastern Queensland. Common names include corkwood, hard corkwood, corkwood laurel and pink corkwood.

== Description ==
Endiandra sieberi is a medium-sized tree to 30 metres tall and 90 cm in trunk diameter.

=== Bark, trunk and leaves ===
The bark is a fawnish grey, relatively soft and corky. Large trees sometimes shortly flanged but not buttressed at the base. The trunk is straight and cylindrical.

Leaves are alternate, simple and entire. 5 to 8 cm long, drawn out to a blunt point. Mid-green on the leaf top, but paler green beneath. Leaf stalks 5 to 10 mm.

Midrib raised slightly on the upper surface but flattened beneath. Net veins clearly seen as in Cryptocarya microneura. Mid rib colour is creamy yellow.

=== Flowers, fruit and germination ===
Flowers appear from June to October, being cream or yellow in panicles.

The fruit is an egg shaped drupe. Black and shiny, 2 to 3.5 cm long. The single seed is ovate and pointed 25 to 30 mm long. Fruit eaten by rainforest birds including the white-headed pigeon and topknot pigeon. Fruit ripe from March to October.

Like most Australian laurel fruit, removal of the fleshy aril is advised to assist seed germination. Roots and shoots usually appear within three to twelve months, with a germination rate of around 20 percent.

== Timber and uses ==
Timber is light coloured, hard and close grained. In colonial times, the bark proved an unsuccessful cork substitute, compared with cork from the cork oak.

== Gallery ==
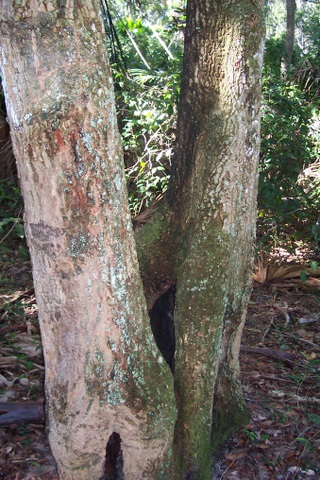
Corkwood growing at Wyrrabalong National Park, Australia

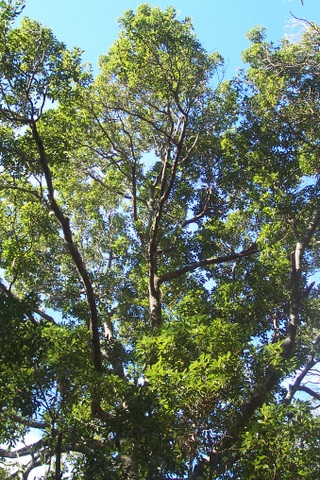
Corkwood growing at Wyrrabalong National Park

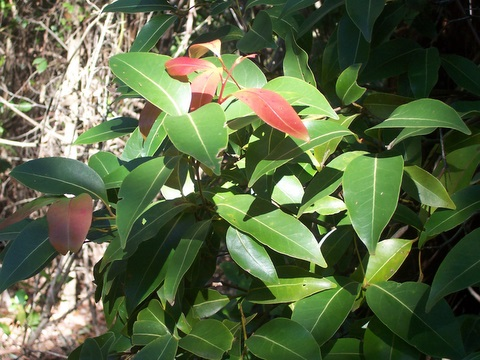
new red Corkwood leaves growing at Wyrrabalong National Park

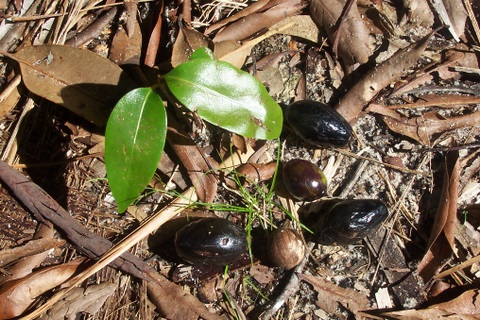
Corkwood seedling & fruit at Wyrrabalong National Park

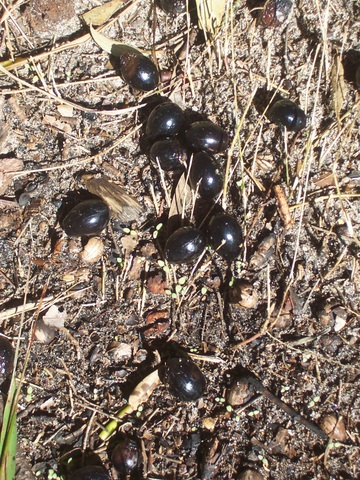
fallen Corkwood fruit on sand, Wyrrabalong National Park

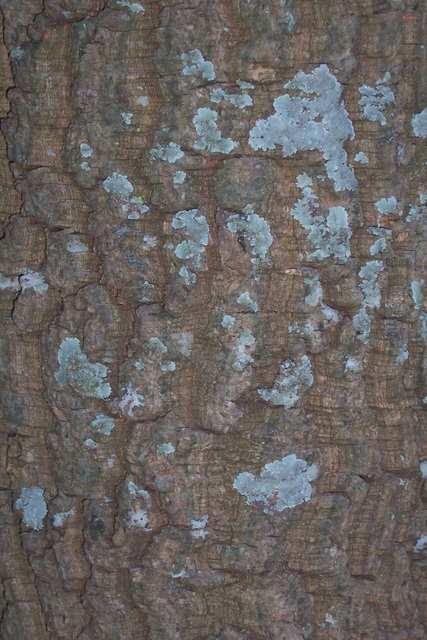
Corkwood bark, growing at Chatswood West

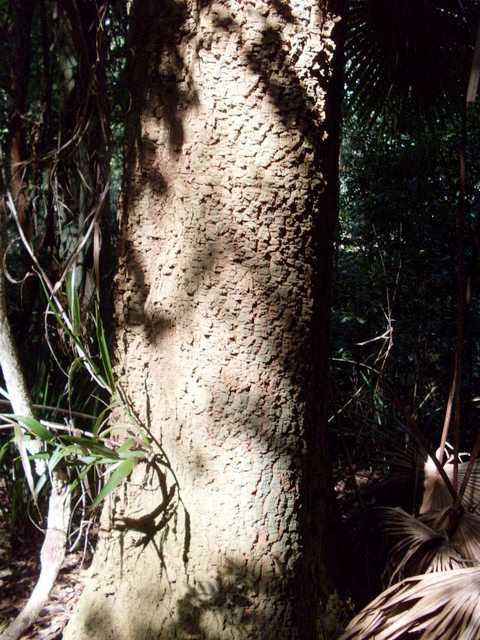
30 metre tall Corkwood growing by the Hacking River, Australia

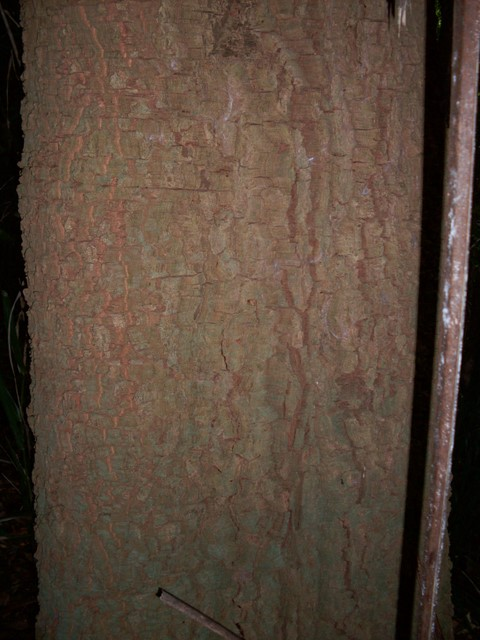
30 metre tall Corkwood growing by the Hacking River, Australia

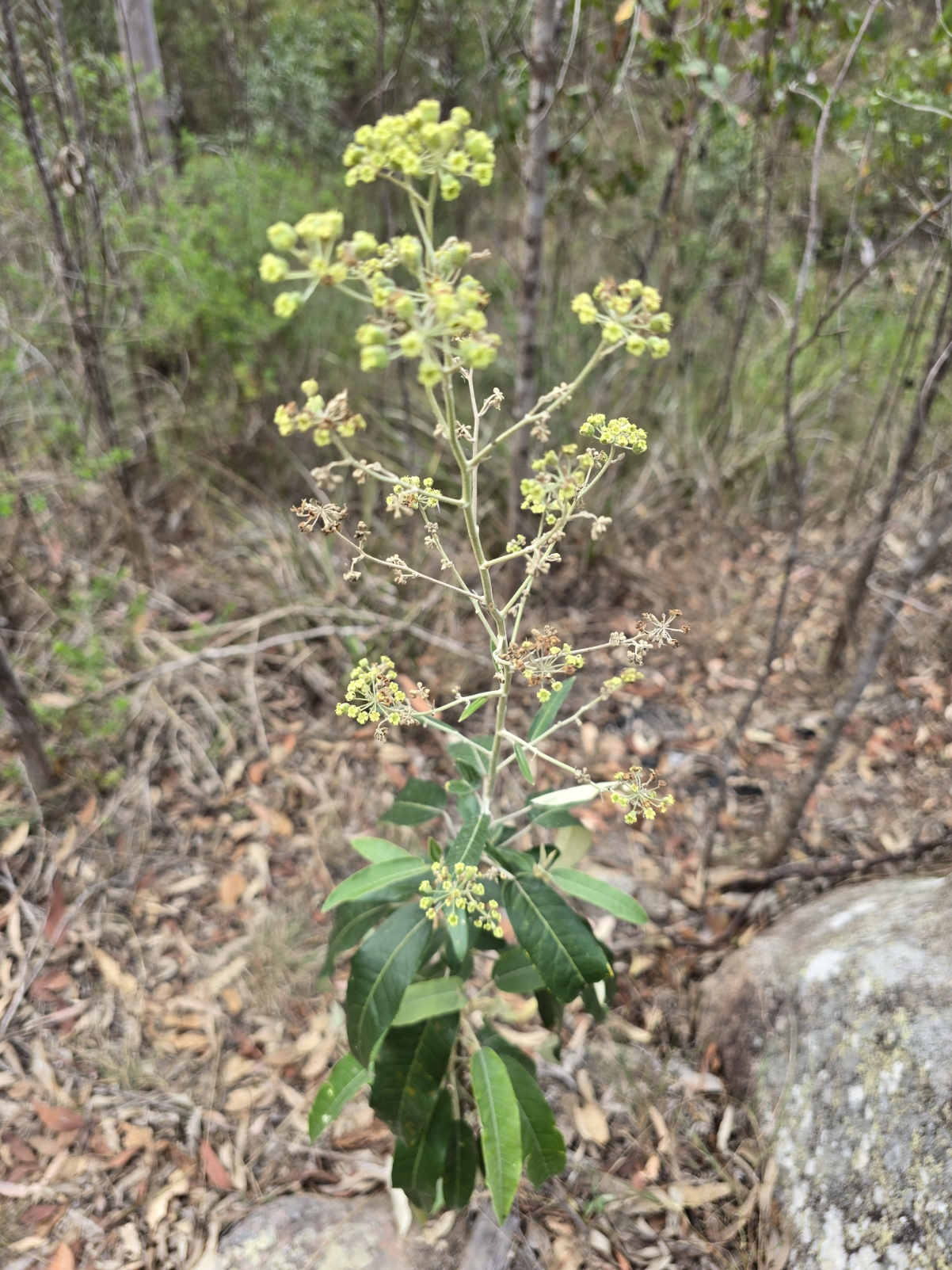
Flower panicles of Endiandra sieberi at Crows Nest National Park, Queensland
