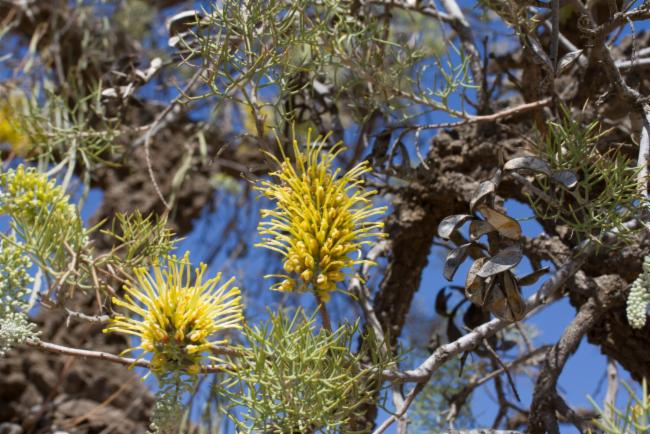

Scientific classification
- Kingdom: Plantae
- Clade: Tracheophytes
- Clade: Angiosperms
- Clade: Eudicots
- Order: Proteales
- Family: Proteaceae
- Genus: Hakea
- Species: H. eyreana

Binomial name
- Hakea eyreana (S.Moore) McGill.
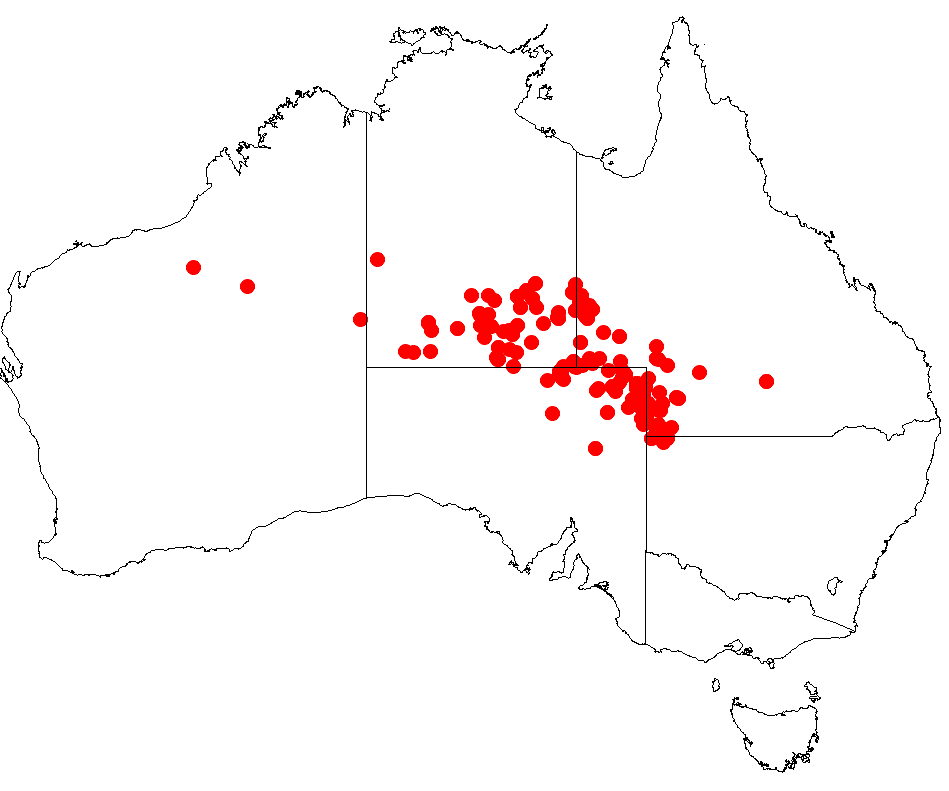
- Occurrence data from AVH

= Hakea eyreana =

Species of tree endemic to inland Australia

Hakea eyreana, commonly known as straggly corkbark, is a tree in the family Proteaceae and is endemic to arid parts of inland Australia. It has needle-shaped leaves, greenish-yellow flowers and oblong to egg-shaped fruit.

== Description ==
The bushy to slender tree typically grows to a height of 2 to 7 metres (7 to 23 ft). The tree is able to resprout from the base and has densely white-haired branchlets. The compound and terete leaves have a length of 1.5 to 9.5 centimetres (0.6 to 3.7 in). It blooms from May to November and produces greenish-yellow flowers. The axillary inflorescences contain 35 to 105 greenish to yellow flowers. The glabrous woody fruits that form following flowering have an oblong to ovate shape and are 2.5 to 4.2 cm (1.0 to 1.7 in) in length with a long beak. The seeds within take up most of valve and have a wing that goes half way along one side.

== Taxonomy ==
The species was first formally identified by the botanist Donald McGillivray in 1975 as part of the work Australian Proteaceae: New taxa and notes as published in the journal Telopea. The name is commonly misapplied to Hakea divaricata. The specific epithet is taken from the area in which the type specimen was collected near Lake Eyre which in turn is named in honour of the explorer Edward John Eyre.

== Distribution ==
The tree is endemic to an area in the Simpson Desert and Channel Country in outback South Australia, New South Wales, Queensland and the Northern Territory where it is found on sand dunes, sand plains, swales and gibber flats growing in sandy or stony soils.

== Uses ==
The flowers contain a large amount of nectar, to the extent where it can be sipped from a straw. The nectar is also mixed with water to make a sweet drink.
