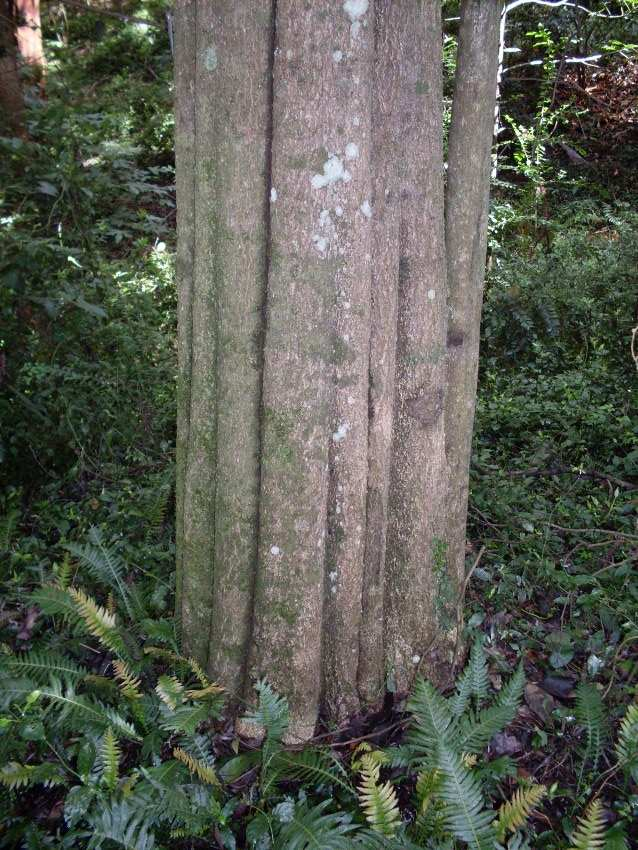
- Fluted trunk

Conservation status
- Least Concern (IUCN 3.1)

Scientific classification
- Kingdom: Plantae
- Clade: Tracheophytes
- Clade: Angiosperms
- Clade: Magnoliids
- Order: Laurales
- Family: Lauraceae
- Genus: Cryptocarya
- Species: C. microneura

Binomial name
- Cryptocarya microneura Meisn.

= Cryptocarya microneura =

Species of tree

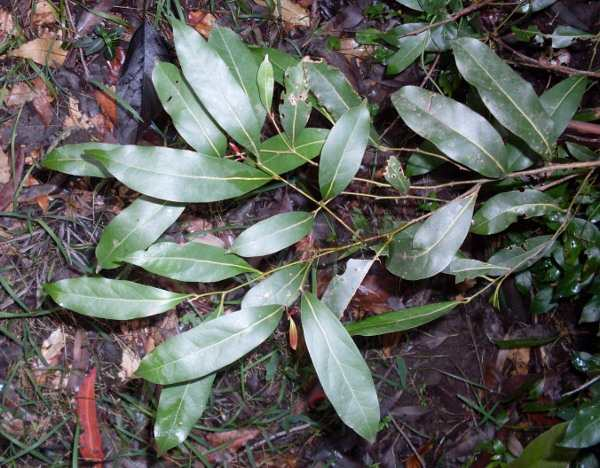
Leaves

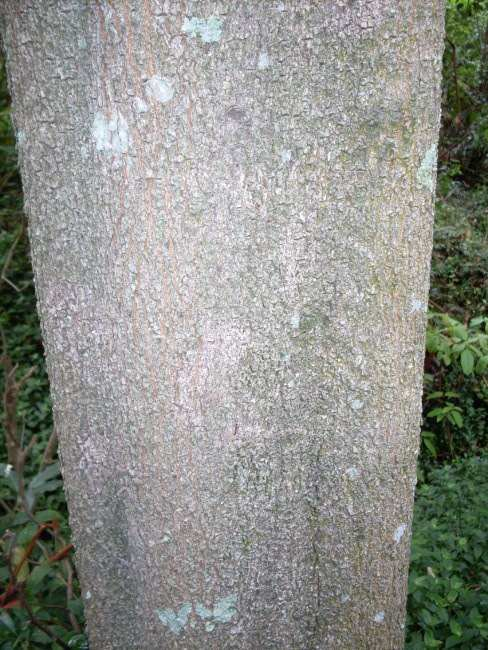
Bark

Cryptocarya microneura, commonly known as murrogun, murrogun laurel or brown jack, is a species of flowering plant in the laurel family and is endemic to eastern Australia. It is a rainforest tree with lance-shaped to elliptic leaves, the flowers cream-coloured and tube-shaped but not perfumed, and the fruit a spherical to elliptic black drupe.

== Description ==
Cryptocarya microneura, is a tree that typically grows to a height of 15 m (49 ft), sometimes to 25 m (82 ft), its stems not buttressed. Its leaves are lance-shaped to elliptic, 62–115 mm (2.4–4.5 in) long and 20–45 mm (0.79–1.77 in) wide on a petiole 5–11 mm (0.20–0.43 in) long. The leaves are green and more or less glaucous on the lower surface. The flowers are cream-coloured and arranged in panicles sometimes longer than the leaves, sometimes shorter than the leaves. The outer tepals are 1.4–1.7 mm (0.055–0.067 in) long, the inner tepals 1.5–1.9 mm (0.059–0.075 in) long. The outer anthers 0.7–0.8 mm (0.028–0.031 in) long and 0.5–0.6 mm (0.020–0.024 in) wide, the inner anthers 0.6–0.8 mm (0.024–0.031 in) long and 0.3–0.5 mm (0.012–0.020 in) wide. Flowering occurs from September to November, and the fruit is a spherical to elliptic black drupe 12–14 mm (0.47–0.55 in) long and 10–14 mm (0.39–0.55 in) wide.

== Taxonomy ==
Cryptocarya microneura was first formally described in 1864 by Carl Meissner in de Candolle's Prodromus Systematis Naturalis Regni Vegetabilis. The specific epithet (microneura) means 'small-nerved'.

== Distribution and habitat ==
This species of Cryptocarya grows in rainforest and wet forest from sea level to 600 m (2,000 ft) elevation from Gympie in Queensland to Tuross Heads in New South Wales.
