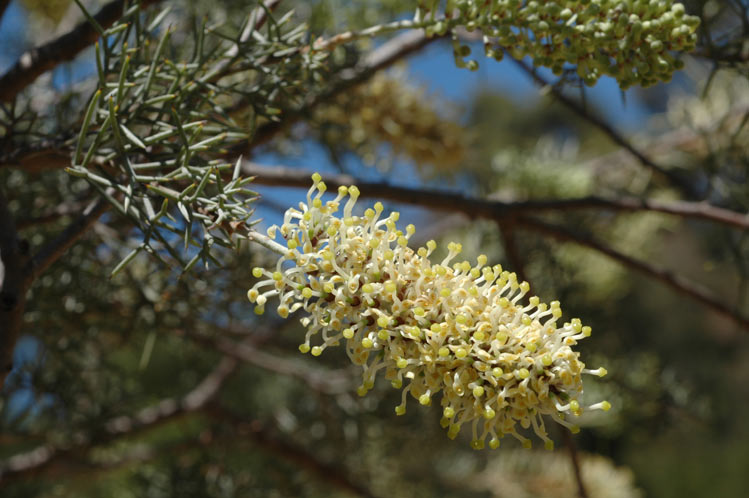

Scientific classification
- Kingdom: Plantae
- Clade: Tracheophytes
- Clade: Angiosperms
- Clade: Eudicots
- Order: Proteales
- Family: Proteaceae
- Genus: Hakea
- Species: H. ednieana

Binomial name
- Hakea ednieana Tate
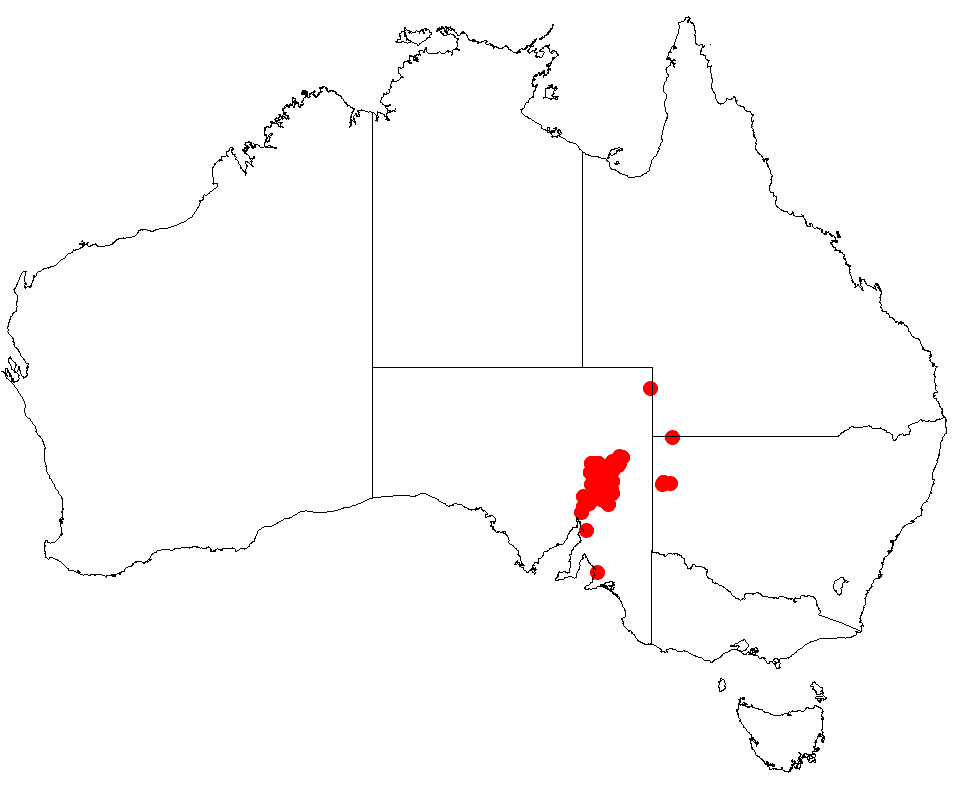
- Occurrence data from AVH

= Hakea ednieana =

Flinders Range hakea

Species of shrub native to central Australia

Hakea ednieana commonly known as Flinders Range hakea or yandena, is a flowering plant in the Proteaceae family native to arid parts of central Australia. It has corky bark, grey-green spiky leaves and white, cream or yellow flowers.

== Description ==
Hakea ednieana is a multi-stemmed shrub or small tree typically growing to a height of 2 to 5 metres (6.6 to 16.4 ft) with brown furrowed bark and white hairy smaller branches. The needle-shaped leaves are 2 to 7 centimetres (0.79 to 2.76 in) long and 0.7 to 1.8 millimetres (0.028 to 0.071 in) wide with short soft white hairs. The leaves are on a base 0.6–4 cm (0.24–1.6 in) long then spread or turn upward and divide into 1–14 final segments 0.1–3.6 cm (0.039–1.4 in) long and 0.7–1.8 mm (0.028–0.071 in) wide. The inflorescence consists of 35–100 cream-white flowers on a stalk with white soft hairs that is 20–75 mm (0.79–3.0 in) long. The pedicel is 3–9 mm (0.12–0.35 in) long with soft white hairs. The perianth has a slight bend, white soft hairs and 2–5 mm (0.079–0.20 in) long. The straight style is 8.5–11 mm (0.33–0.43 in) long. It produces white flowers from September to December. The red brown woody fruit are 2 to 3.4 centimetres (0.79 to 1.34 in) long and 7 to 11 millimetres (0.276 to 0.433 in) wide. The fruit are in clusters, occasionally with soft hairs or smooth, ending with a long beak and inconspicuous horns. The fruit seeds occupy much of the valve and are 19 to 26 mm (0.75 to 1.02 in) in length and 6 to 10 mm (0.236 to 0.394 in) wide with a wing that goes partially down one side.

== Taxonomy and naming ==
Hakea ednieana was first formally described by Ralph Tate in 1885 and published in Transactions, proceedings and report, Royal Society of South Australia. The specific epithet (ednieana) honours John Ednie Brown, who was once the Conservator of Forests in South Australia.

== Distribution and habitat ==
Flinders Range hakea is endemic to an area in western New South Wales and the Flinders Ranges and Far North of South Australia. The plant is often situated on and around rocky cliff faces and along water courses in stony or sandy soils. It is common in South Australia but rare in New South Wales.
