= Hakea ivoryi =

Scientific classification
- Kingdom: Plantae
- Clade: Tracheophytes
- Clade: Angiosperms
- Clade: Eudicots
- Order: Proteales
- Family: Proteaceae
- Genus: Hakea
- Species: H. ivoryi

Binomial name
- Hakea ivoryi F.M.Bailey
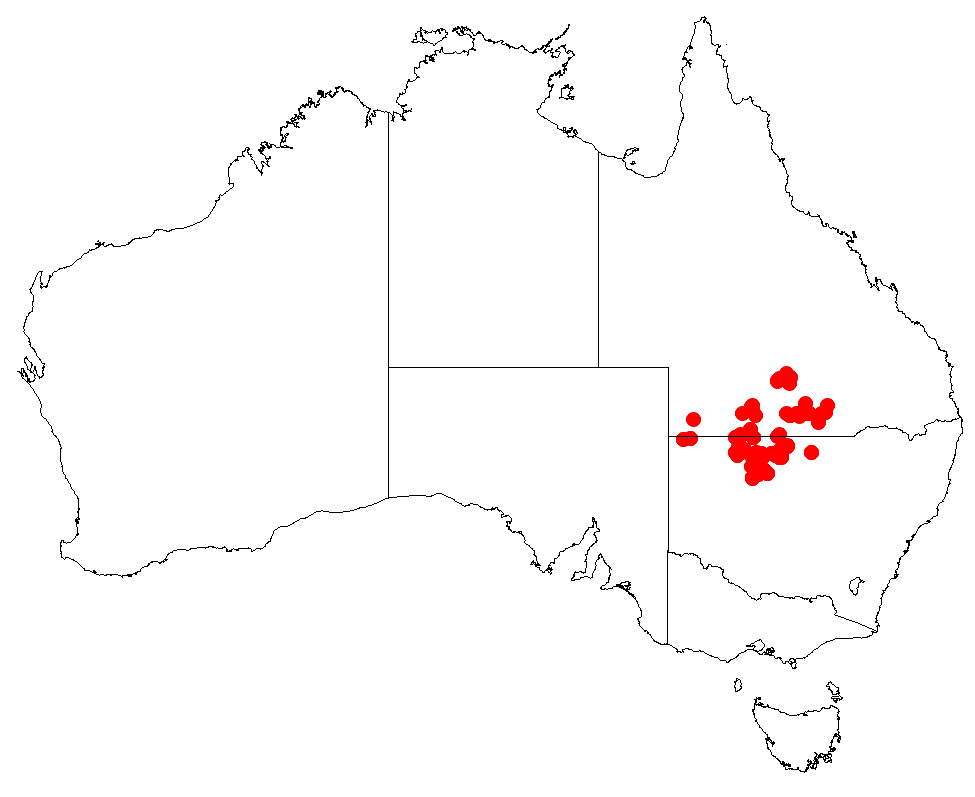
- Occurrence data from AVH

Species of flowering plant

Hakea ivoryi, commonly known as Ivory's hakea, corkwood or the corkbark tree, is a shrub or small tree in the family Proteaceae and is endemic to an area in the South West region of Queensland and the north west of New South Wales.

== Description ==
Hakea ivoryi is shrub or small tree typically grows to a height of 2 to 12 metres (7 to 39 ft) with white flat silky hairs becoming smooth along branchlets and forms a lignotuber. It has simple needle-like leaves 3 to 18 centimetres (1 to 7 in) long with silky hairs becoming hairless with age. Young trees often have highly divided segmented leaves. The bark is brown, rough and corky. The inflorescence consists of 20–50 white-cream flowers on a short stem and appear in leaf axils from October to January. The fruit are smooth, egg-shaped 25–35 mm (0.98–1.4 in) long and 10–15 mm (0.4–0.6 in) wide ending with a short beak.

== Taxonomy and naming ==
Hakea ivoryi was first formally described by Frederick Manson Bailey in 1901 as part of the work The Queensland Flora and the description was published in The Queensland Flora. Hakea ivoryi was named after William Ivory who collected specimens for Frederick Bailey.

== Distribution and habitat ==
Scattered or growing in small groups on sand plains or loam in open arid woodland in the Bourke-Wanaaring districts and south-western Queensland.
