= Lachryphagy =

Consumption of tears

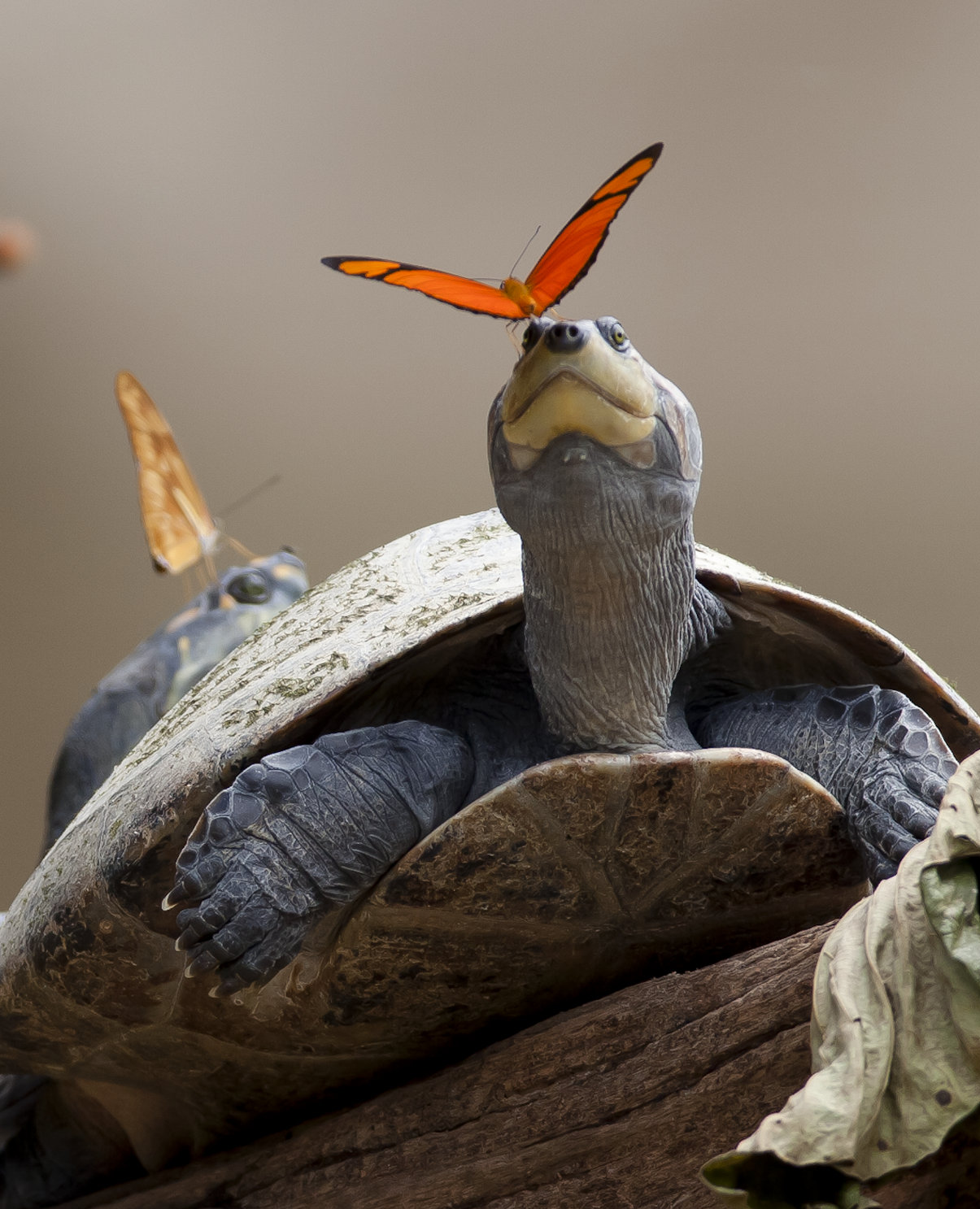
Two Julia Butterflies (Dryas iulia) drinking tears from turtles in Ecuador.

Lachryphagy is the practice of feeding on tears and other eye secretions. Certain bees, butterflies, and flies have been observed feeding on the tears of reptiles, birds, and mammals, including humans. Lachryphagous insects gather nutrients, especially sodium and proteins, from the tears. Lachryphagous feeding can be unbothersome or painful, with some feeding insects damaging the eye and introducing pathogens to the host. Lachryphagy has been studied as a form of parasitism, commensalism, and puddling.

It is best known as a behavior of butterflies and moths (Lepidoptera). Flies, stingless bees, and other insects such as cockroaches and lice have also been recorded feeding on tears, and there is evidence that some stingless bee colonies in Southeast Asia have specialized tear collectors as a division of labor.

== Lepidopterans ==
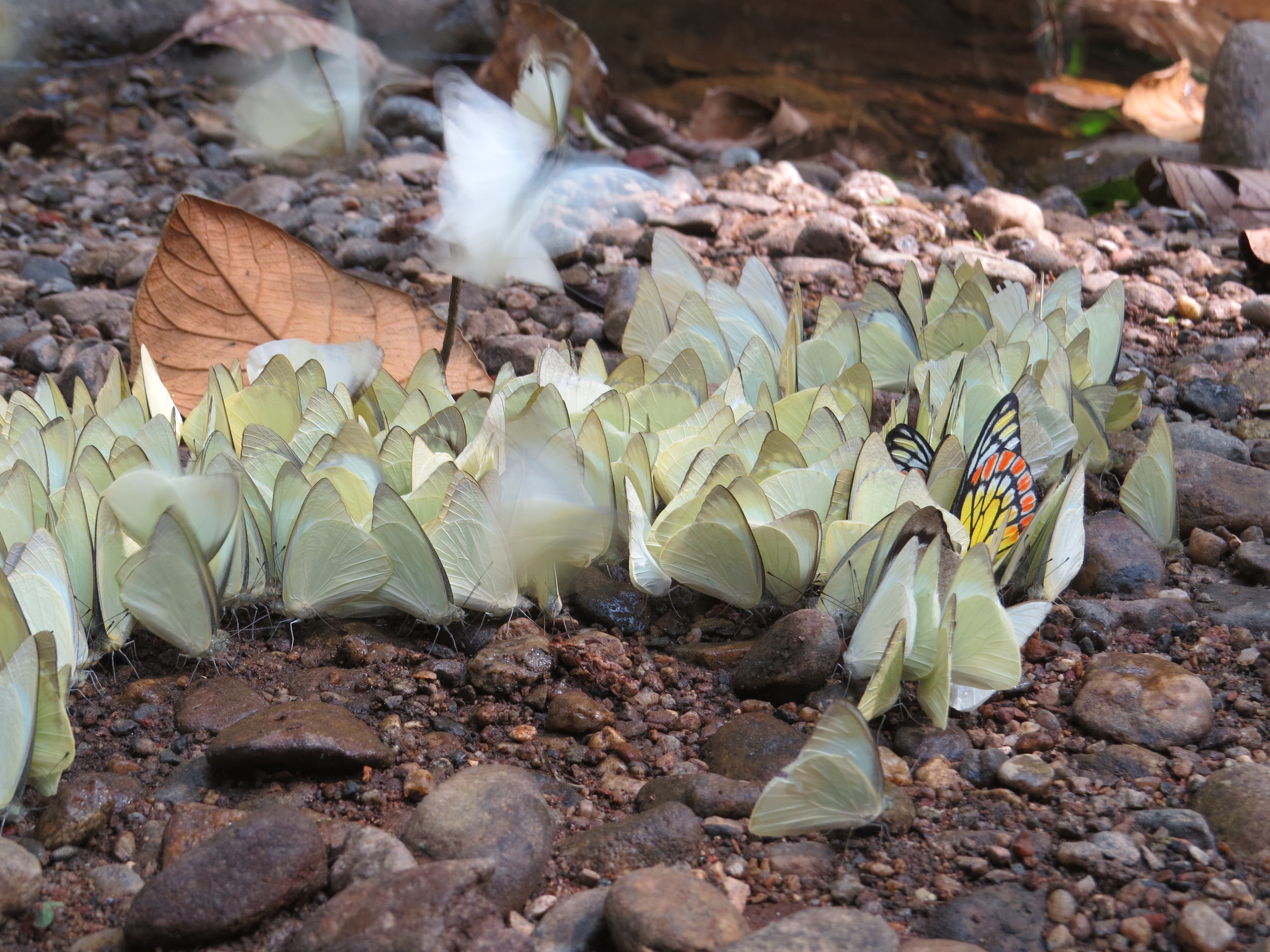
Tear-drinking behavior in lepidopterans is thought to derive from mud-puddling, wherein butterflies and moths obtain nutrients in damp soil

Lachryphagy is best known as a behavior of adult butterflies and moths (Lepidoptera). Tear-drinking and eye-frequenting behavior has been observed in butterflies and moths throughout tropical and subtropical regions of Africa and Asia, particularly in their "savanna belts and monsoon regions ... where the dry season covers a period of at least three to four months, and where rainfall and humidity are too low for rainforests." Bänziger numbered the known lachryphagous moths in 2009 at around 100 species across six families, with 23 imbibing from human eyes. Wilhelm Büttiker and J. D. Bezuidenhout recorded the first accounts of lepidopteran lachryphagy in southwest Africa in 1974, of three species (Note: Arcyophora longivalvis, A. zanderi, and A. patricula.) in the genus Arcyophora. They found these eye-frequenting moths drinking from the eyes of domestic cows and goats. It is also documented in South and Central American moth species, and two accounts of moth lachryphagy in the United States have been recorded—from a horse in Arkansas in 1972, and from a moose in Vermont in 2024. These two incidents represent the sole documented observations of lepidopteran lachryphagy outside of the tropics or subtropics.

Lachryphagy in lepidopterans is thought to have evolved from mud-puddling behavior, in contrast to hematophagous Lepidoptera whose behavior is thought to derive from fruit-piercing feeding. Most moths observed drinking tears are male, suggesting that male lachryphagous moths collect sodium (which is essential to moth reproduction) to transfer to females during mating. Tears form the largest part of the diets of most eye-frequenting moths. Only two species, Lobocraspis griseifusa and Arcyophora sylvatica, are known to be eulachryphagous (feeding exclusively on tears). L. griseifusa secrete gut proteases which allow them to digest proteins in tears, making it the only lepidopteran adult capable of digesting proteins. Lachryphagous behavior among moths seems to be limited to nocturnal species, likely because hosts are less alert at night. It has been proposed that lachryphagous moths drink tears due to a scarcity of flowers or in pursuit of essential salts.

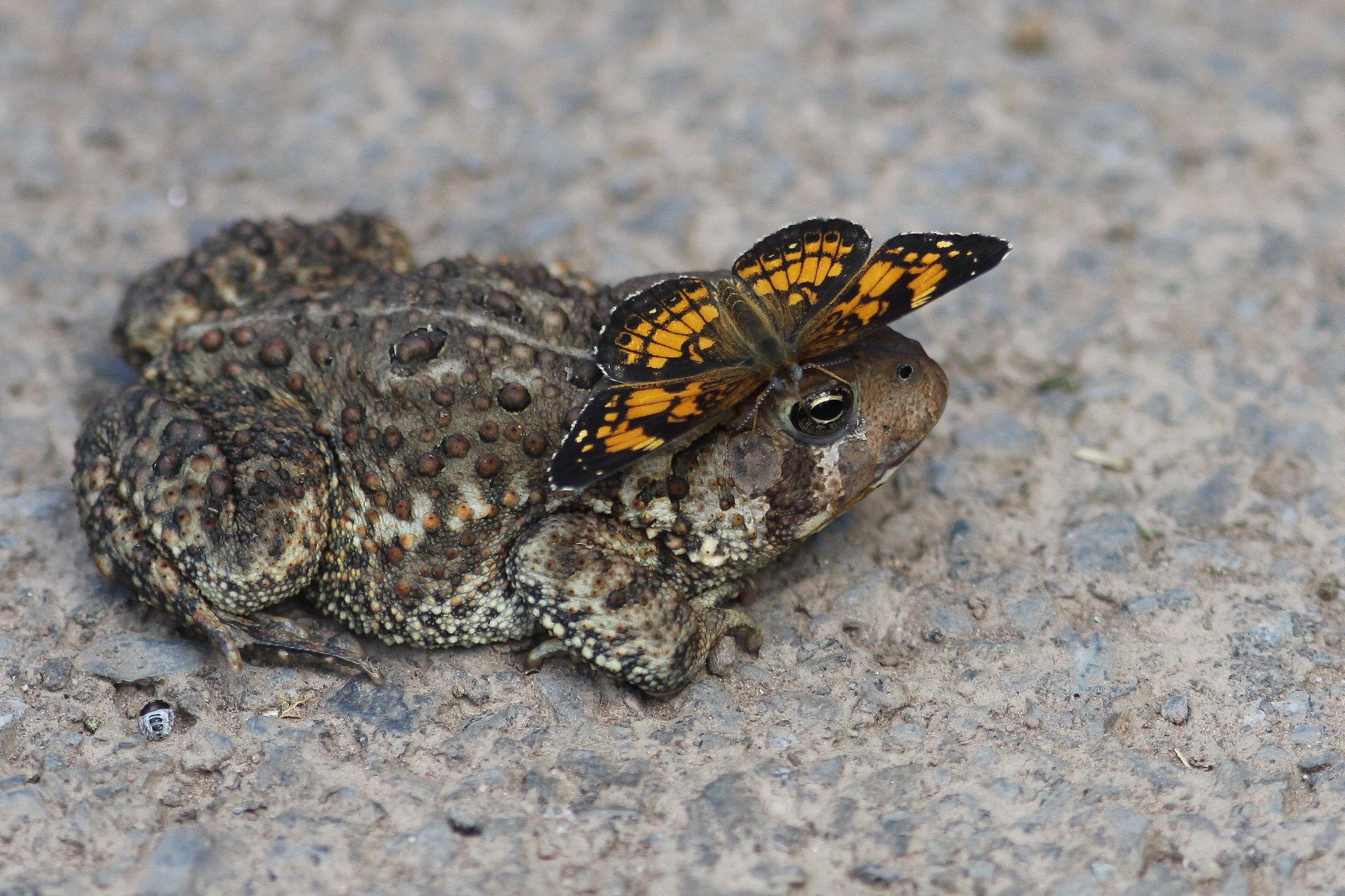
A silvery checkerspot drinking from the eye of an Eastern American toad in Frederick, Maryland

Most known lachryphagous lepidopterans are nocturnal moths. Lachryphagy in butterflies has been documented only in South America, with only reptiles as hosts, with the exception of an observation of Salamis anteva drinking from a human eye in September 1988 in the village of Ambodimanga at the Marojejy Strict Nature Reserve. The observing researchers were unaware of the incident's noteworthiness, taking a photo only to amuse themselves and taking no notes on the observation. It was ultimately published, with the photograph and a description of the event, in 2008.

=== Hosts ===
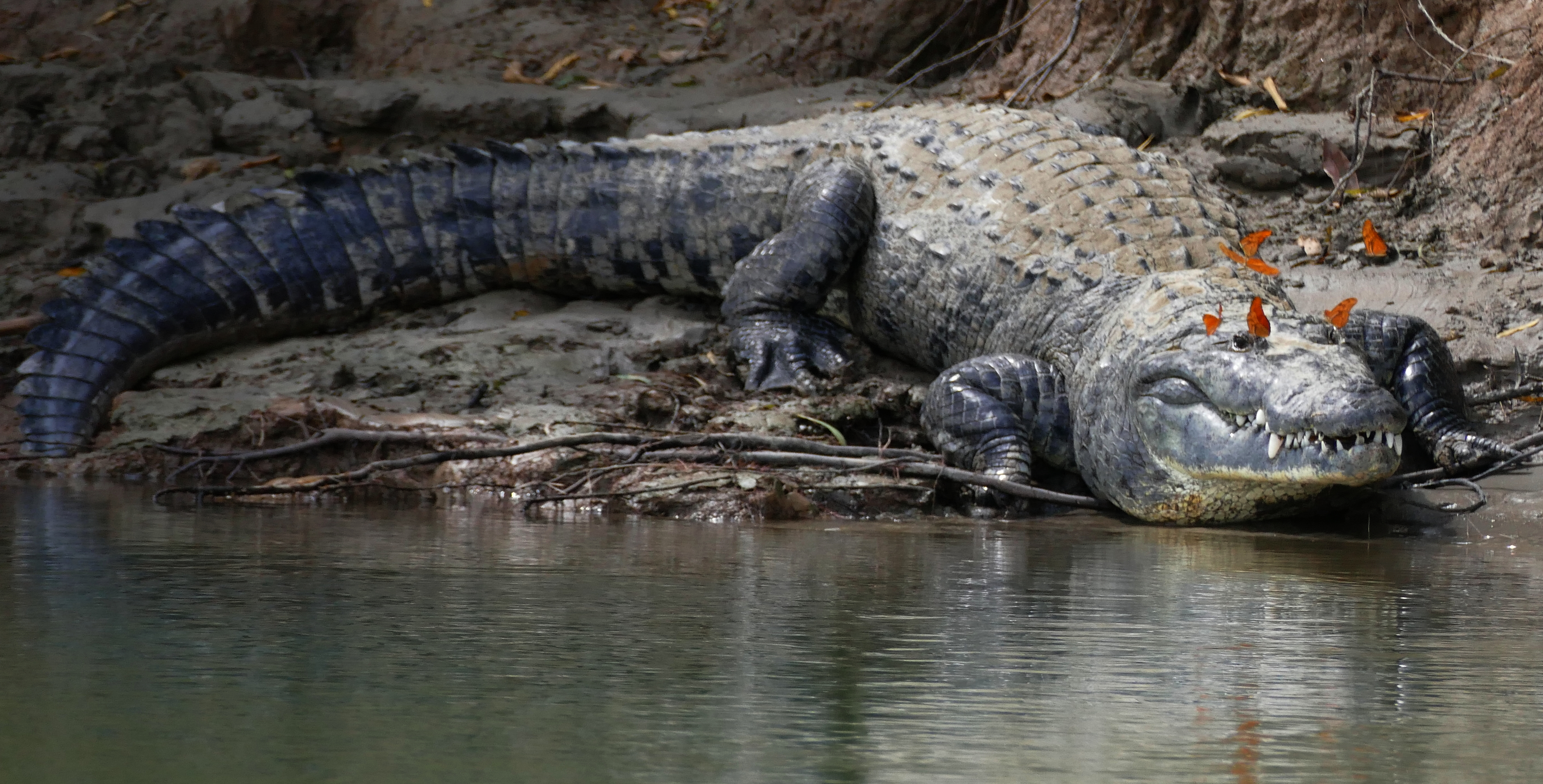
Julia Butterflies drinking from the eyes of a male Morelet's Crocodile.

Trail camera footage of moths visiting the eyes of a male moose (Alces americanus americanus) on June 19, 2024, in the Green Mountain National Forest, Vermont, USA

The wild and domesticated mammalian hosts (besides humans) of moths include antelope, elephants, giraffes, hippopotami, horses, kangaroos, mules, pigs, rhinoceroses, sambar deer, sheep, tapirs, water buffalo, and cattle. Butterflies have been observed drinking the tears of reptiles, including turtles and crocodiles. Lachryphagic moths generally do not specialize in any host species, and generally prefer large hosts, who are less reactive and sensitive to the moths. Lachryphagy on large hosts (such as crocodiles) is generally observed during the day, while lachryphagy on small hosts is more commonly practiced at night. A camera trap photographed moth lachryphagy on a moose in Green Mountain National Forest in 2024.

==== Birds ====
Moth lachryphagy on avian hosts has been documented only three times.

The first report of moths feeding on the tears of birds was published in 2007. The Malagasy moth Hemiceratoides hieroglyphica was found to probe its sharp proboscis into the closed eyes of sleeping birds at night to drink their tears. H. hieroglyphica's proboscis is unique among those of lachryphagous moths, being armored with "hooks, barbs, and spines" and "shaped like an ancient harpoon". The proboscis is similar in anatomy to those of fruit-eating and blood-sucking calpine moths, to which H. hieroglyphica is more closely related than it is to other lachryphagous moths. The researchers who observed it noted that H. hieroglyphica does not use its harpoon-like proboscis to pierce the bird's eyelid; they theorize that its barbs are used to secure the proboscis in place between the bird's eyelids while the moth feeds. This species is specialized to drinking the tears of birds because of the lack of large mammals in Madagascar, whose most common large-eyed mammals, such as lemurs, are nocturnal. David Plotkin considers it likely that H. hieroglyphica is the "most competent vector for a disease agent" among lachryphagous moths.

External videos
- Gorgone macarea drinking the tears of a black-chinned antbird in Brazil

Two cases have been observed in South America: an Azeta melanea drinking from a ringed kingfisher in Colombia (2015), and a Gorgone macarea drinking from a black-chinned antbird along the banks of the Solimões River in the central Amazon, Brazil. The antbirds appeared unbothered as they were exploited by the moths, whose large proboscises allowed them to rest on their hosts' necks. The observing researcher theorized that the birds' immobility may be explained by their lowered nocturnal metabolic rate.

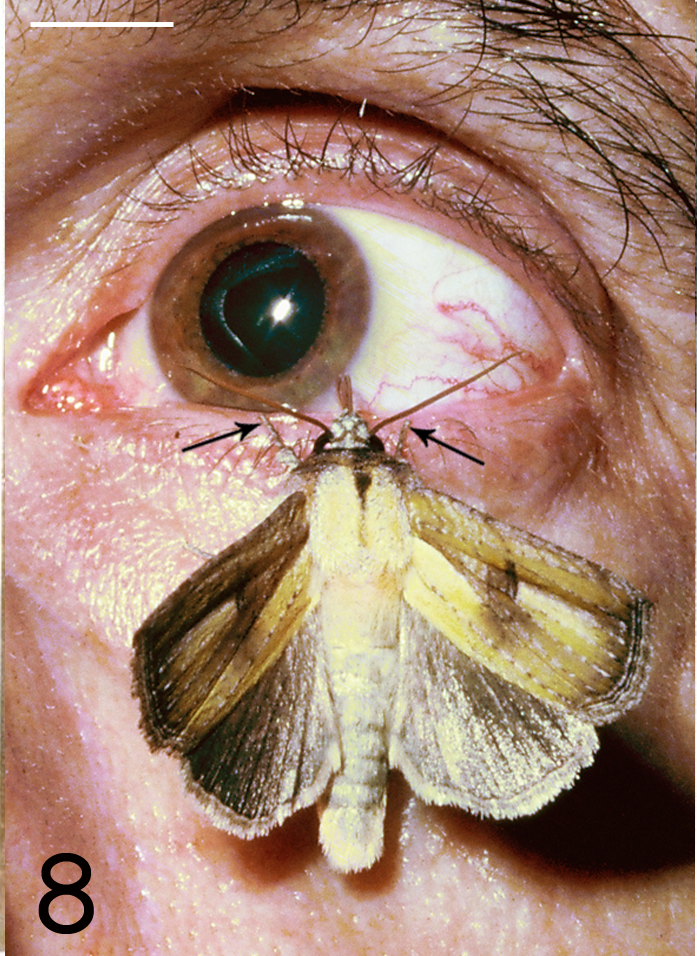
Chaeopsestis ludovicae drinking from Hans Bӓnziger's eye

==== Humans ====
Lachryphagy of human tears by moths was first observed in 1966. According to Bänziger's 1972 study of lachryphagous moths in Southeast Asia, the people most exposed to tear-feeding moths are outdoor-sleeping herders, woodcutters, porters, and caravan travelers who walk forest paths during the monsoon season to transport goods such as betel nuts, opium, and cattle. No moth is known to specialize in human tears. Experiments by Bänziger (wearing unwashed clothes, deliberately strengthening his body odor, smearing his face with banteng tears) along with his observation that most incidents of human tear-feeding occurred when subjects were within 10 meters of a larger animal host suggest that humans are not attractive hosts—"certainly less so than water buffalo". According to Bänziger, Thai villagers are often reluctant to associate eye diseases with moth lachryphagy "due to their respect for nature and fear of cosmic punishment." Many locals believe that illnesses of this kind are caused by forest spirits or are punishment for trespassing into sacred areas of jungle, and are hesitant in discussing their interactions with insects. They refrain from catching or harming lachryphagous moths, and do not try to swat them away even if they land on them, instead "suffer[ing] the irritation in silence unless the annoyance becomes unbearable." In 1995, Bänziger reported that the southeast Asian moth Microstega homoculorum, previously misidentified along with M. acutangulata as Pionea aureolalis in earlier studies of lachryphagy, is the most frequently observed lachryphagous moth of humans.

=== Feeding position and conditions ===
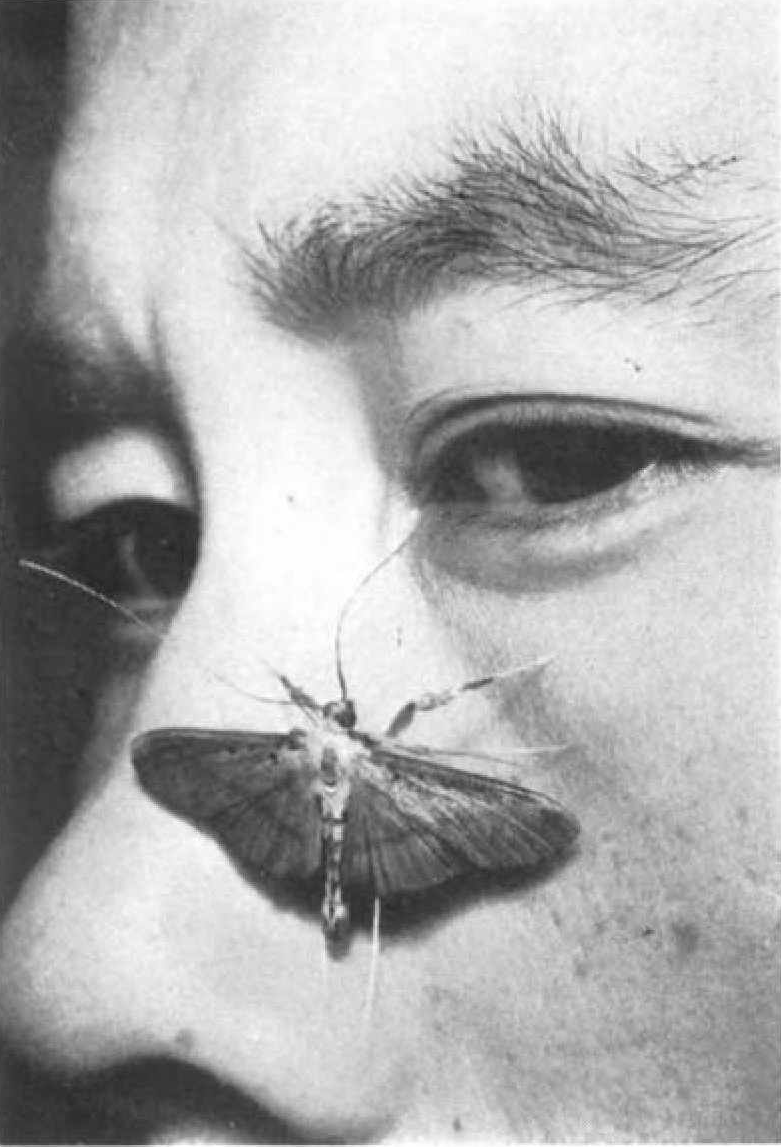
Filodes fulvidorsalis drinking from a human eye in Chiang Mai (1966)

Lachryphagous moths drink tears directly from the eye as well as from tear-stained cheeks. Most moths circle the head before landing quickly on the face, probing for any wetness (in the nose, mouth, eyes, or ears) before settling at the eye. By contrast, L. griseifusa flies directly to the eye, extending its proboscis to drink after "quivering for a few seconds" upon landing. Both L. griefusa and A. sylvatica—the two known moths whose entire diet consists of tears—drink only directly from the eye, never from the cheek. Crambids like Filodes fluvidorsalis rest with their wings open, and feed from afar with the proboscis extended, while lachryphagous Geometridae, whose wings are elevated and folded at rest, feed very close to the eye. The very large hawkmoth Rhagastis olivacea, whose spiny legs would likely cause discomfort to a host, hovers in the air with its proboscis extended to drink from a human eye "with minimal interference". Bänziger described the experience as painless and less irritating than other species, like a "cool, smooth foreign body moving between the lower lid and the cornea." This suggests a correlation between morphology and feeding position in lachryphagous moths, as more obtrusively-shaped moths must avoid causing irritation to the host in order to continue their drinking in peace.

Groups of moths are commonly seen drinking together, and as many as 13 moths have been observed feeding on a single banteng's eye. Feeding groups are often mixed-species, and individual moths do not competitively drive each other away. Newcoming moths attempting to join groups of 8–10 may struggle to land and be driven away by the wingbeats of already-feeding moths as they attempt to wedge themselves into the group. Individual animals with heavy tear flow attract more moths. Bänziger and his team noted that "certain persons were visited relatively often, while others never were." Lachryphagous moths excrete excess water during and after tear-feeding.

Hans Bänziger's study of eye-frequenting moths in Northern Thailand describes mechanical damage to the eye caused by the moths' proboscises. In a later study, Bänziger described Chaeopsestis ludovicae scratching the conjunctiva with its sharp tarsal claws, causing a sensation like "a grain of sand being rubbed between eye and lid" even as its proboscis produced no irritation. Bänziger describes the sensation of Pionea aureolalis's proboscis probing his eyeball as uncomfortable, inducing a flow of tears, but not painful. Though Bänziger proposed that the probing around the eye was a deliberate maneuver to induce lachrymal flow, David Plotkin notes that this hypothesis is untested, and the probing behavior may simply be a search for an optimal feeding site. Other moths, however, elicited "stinging pain". After 30 minutes of allowing a Lobocraspis griseifusa to drink from his closed eye, Bänziger was so irritated that he had to stop, and for the rest of the day his eye was red and inflamed and hard to keep open. Plotkin suggested that the difference in sensation of being fed on with one's eye open (less irritating) and closed (very painful) may be caused by contact between the host's eyelid and triangular spines on the proboscis. Plotkin suggests that this may be strategic, so as to induce the host to keep its eye open, increasing available eye surface for drinking to allow for multiple moths to imbibe. Rain generally reduces tear-feeding activity, though a brief increase is often seen at the start of a light shower. Wind strongly inhibits feeding, while temperature has little effect—moths are active in both cool and warm conditions. Activity typically rises after long dry periods or dry days following rain. Smoky fires lit by Thai farmers to keep biting insects from cattle were found to repel lachryphagous moths. Some lachryphagous moths also seemed to avoid bright lights, rarely landing on eyes illuminated by researchers' flashlights.

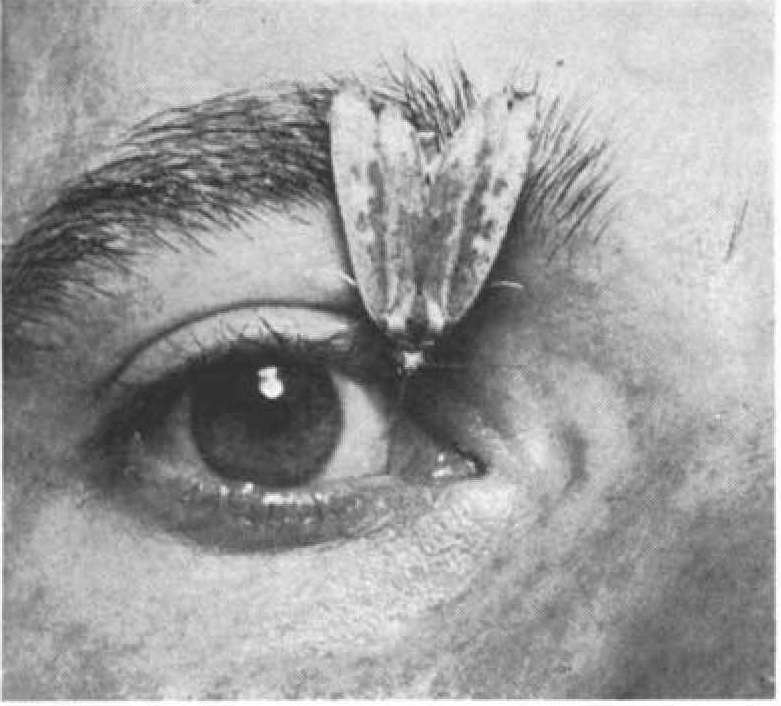
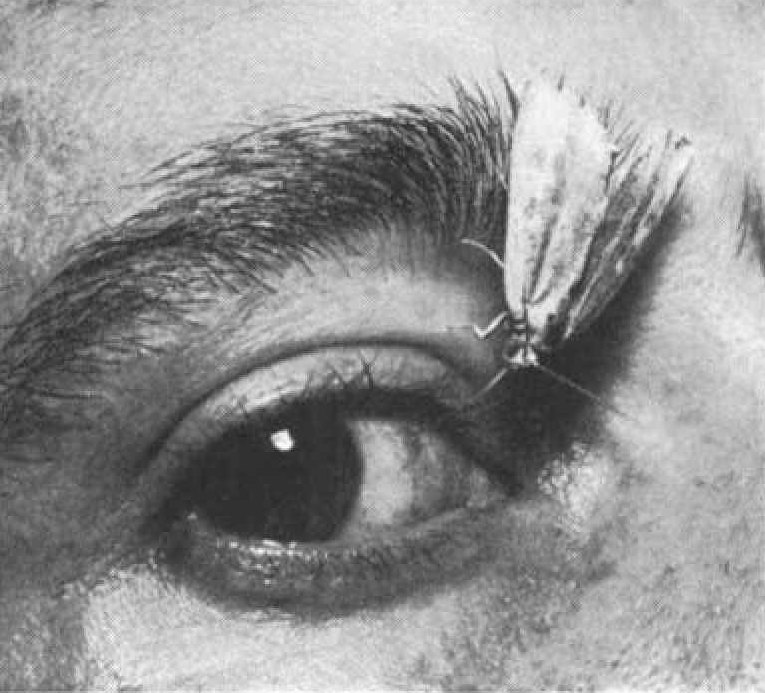
Note the visible inflammation of the eye on the later photo (right) of Lobocraspis griseifusa engaging in lachryphagy

=== Pathology ===
According to Plotkin, "there is no known threat of disease from Lepidoptera that feed on human body fluids." No instance of pathogenic transmission from adult moth lachryphagy has ever been documented; if it were to happen, the pathogen would likely move from the moth's salivary glands to the host's eye via the moth's proboscis. Pathogens could also be transmitted directly from the proboscis to the host's eye. Bänziger and Büttiker posit that a lachryphagous moth that feeds from one animal's wound and then from another animal's eye could transmit pathogens from the wound to the eye, and that scratching of the conjunctiva by the moth's legs (as was observed in Chaeopsestis ludovicae) could transmit pathogens from the leg into the eye via the scratches. Studies of conjunctivitis in African mammals have implicated lachryphagous moths in the spread of eye infections on the continent, especially keratoconjunctivitis. A 1974 paper by Wilhelm Büttiker and J. D. Bezuidenhout says that René Du Toit and Siegfried Stampa, of the Onderstepoort Veterinary Research Institute, had found "that the chemical control of eye-moths may reduce the incidence of the disease in sheep," according to a private correspondence from Du Toit in 1958. In 1975, Büttiker and Jacques Nicolet implicated eye-frequenting lepidoptera as mechanical vectors in the transmission of keratoconjunctivitis among cattle in the Ivory Coast, isolating a number of pathogenic germs in their proboscises, guts, and excrements. A 1995 study found some bacteria found in cattle with opthalmia in the proboscises of lachryphagous moths, implying inconclusively that lachryphagous moths can transmit harmful bacteria to cattle.

== Flies ==
Phortica variegata questing around a human eye during a summer day in Basilicata, an area highly endemic for Thelazia callipaeda

Many flies visit human and animal eyes for tears, especially those in the families Chloropidae, Cryptochetidae, Drosophilidae, and Muscidae. The behavior is mostly limited to male flies. Máca and Otranto propose that the males may collect nutrients from tears to give to their female mates as a "wedding present". Proteins uptaken from eye secretions may also be needed to produce a spermatophore. Most Amiota are lachryphagous, attracted to the tears of humans and other animals—likely seeking sodium. Other genera in which lachryphagous behavior have been observed are Apsiphortica, Gitona, Paraleucophenga, and Apenthecia. Lachryphagous drosophilids tend to approach human faces in vertical zig-zagging motion. Their eye-frequenting behavior tends to be bothersome to animals.

Musca autumnalis, a known vector of thelaziasis, drinking the eye secretions of a cow in North Wales

Human lachryphagy by Steganin flies in the genus Amiota was first recorded in 1921, when John Russell Malloch described Amiota minor persistently trying to land on his hands and face, attracted to his sweat and tears. Male Phortica variegata infect humans and other animals with the larvae of the nematode Thelazia callipaeda, transmitting thelaziasis with their lachryphagous behavior.

== Bees ==
=== Stingless bees ===
Lachryphagy is widespread among Southeast Asian stingless bees, which since 2009 have been observed collecting tears from "humans, zebu, dogs, cats, rabbits, chickens, and yellow tortoises", with chickens being the least sensitive and reactive to the bees. An uncertain observation of a stingless bee "molesting a goliath frog on its eye" has also been documented. Bees of the genus Lisotrigona have evolved specialized abilities—likely involving both sight and smell—to "detect and recognize" the differently shaped eyes of various vertebrates in order to harvest their tears.

Worker bees of the Chinese species Ebaiotrigona carpenteri (Note: Formerly Lisotrigona carpenteri) occasionally switch from their typical sudophagy (sweat-sucking) to lachryphagy in spring and summer, possibly due to the relatively richer protein content in tears as compared to sweat (200 times greater), and as an adaptation to times of decreased availability of nectar and pollen. It has also been proposed that lachryphagy and sudophagy in Lisotrigona represents a state of evolutionary transition from carnivory to highly specialized nectarivorous and palynivorous feeding behavior. Other theories posit that stingless bee lachryphagy evolved in connection with contact between humans and bees; that it evolved from pursuit of moisture in the eyes of birds during a dry period 30–70 million years ago, or from dinosaurs in the late Cretaceous, when flowering plants were uncommon. Lachryphagy in stingless bees may have developed, been lost, and redeveloped multiple times.

Hans Bänziger proposes that Lisotrigona colonies include specialized tear collectors as a division of labor, storing collected tears in cells alongside honey and pollen for use by other bees in the colony. He also proposed that tears may be used to dilute honey or to produce food for larvae. According to Bänziger, Lisotrigona likely regurgitate the tears they collect—either sharing them via trophallaxis or storing them in nest containers—rather than excreting them, since the dissolved proteins in tears would be digested and used as nutrition. Though pollen is richer in protein overall, tear proteins are more readily digestible and include lysozyme, which may help prevent spoilage. Tear-harvesting is energetically efficient, can yield larger loads than pollen, and offers a continuous, year-round protein source—especially valuable for small bees like Lisotrigona with limited foraging ranges and intermittent access to flowers. Tears may also be regurgitated onto the surface of the nest and fanned to cool it during periods of life-threatening heat. Stingless bee lachryphagy rarely occurs near the bee's nest. The maximum observed distance a host was recorded traveling before a Lisotrigona tear-collector flew back to the nest is 680 meters—a great distance for such a small bee.

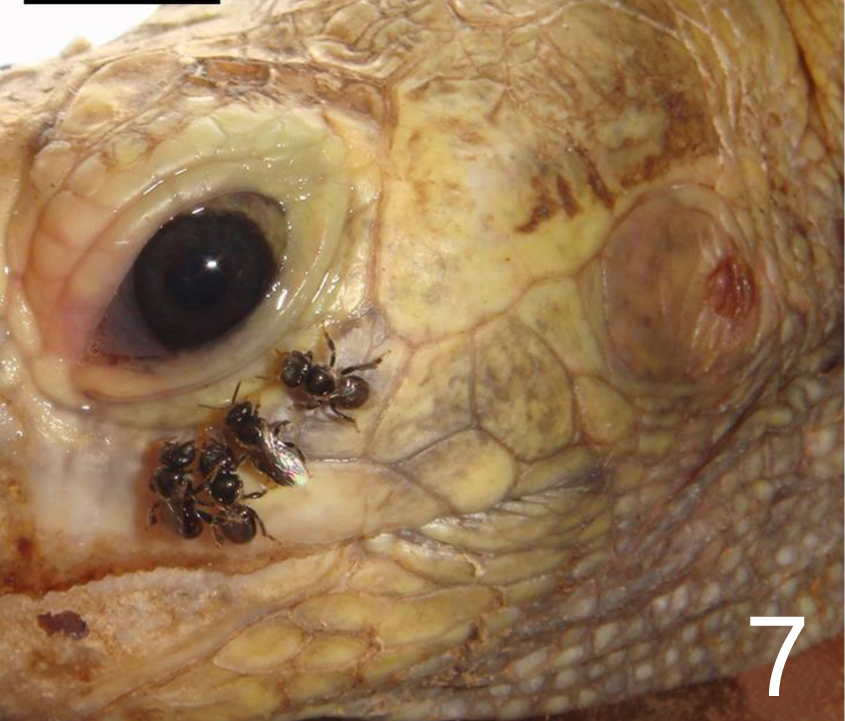
Lisotrigona furva drinking tears flowing from the eye of an elongated tortoise (Indotestudo elongata)

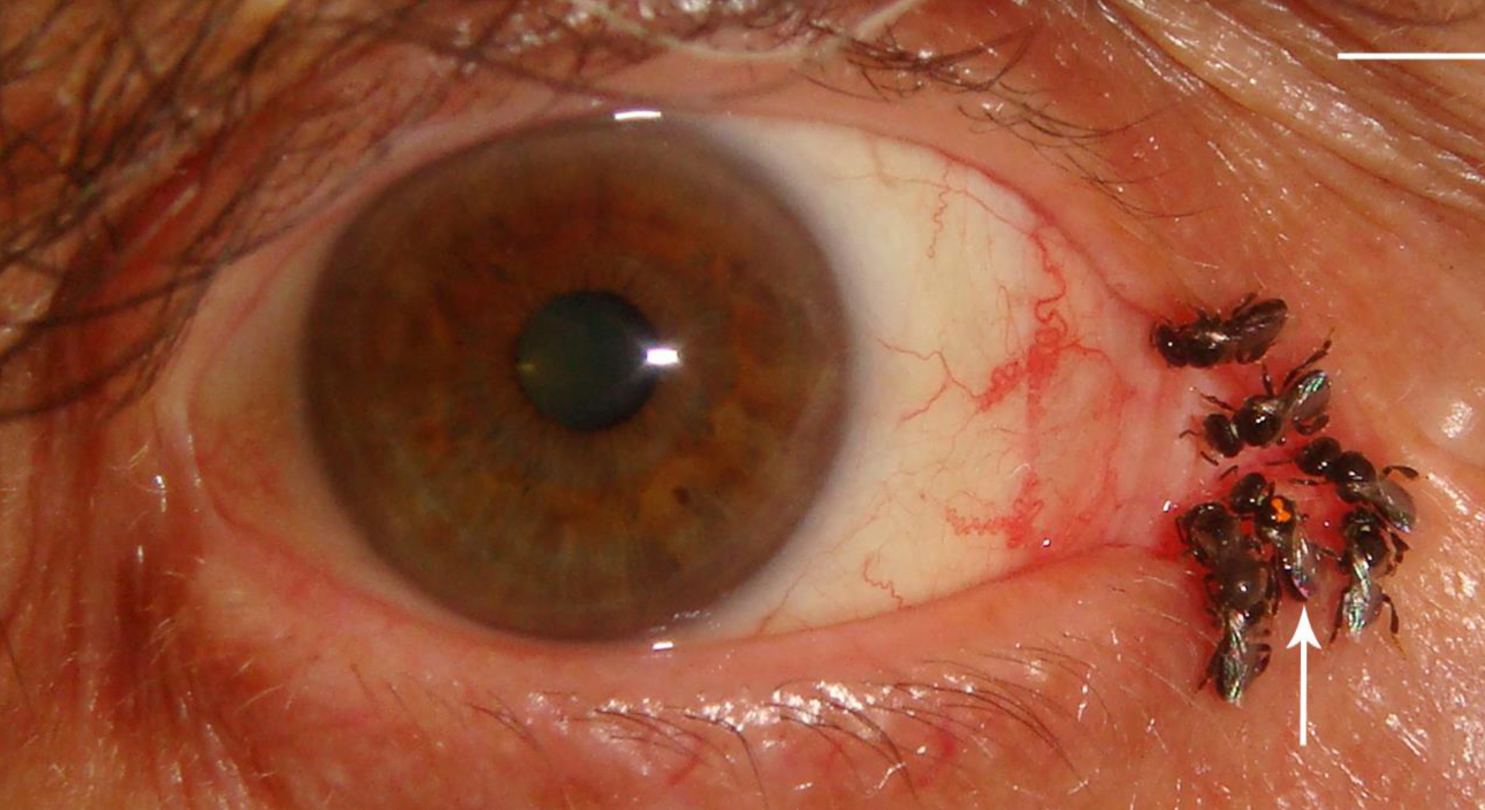
Seven Lisotrigona cacciae workers drinking from Hans Bӓnziger's eye. The orange-marked bee (arrow) is on the 21st of her 74 visits of her second day of lachryphagy documented.

Bänziger observed marked Lisotrigona cacciae and Lisotrigona furva workers repeatedly returning to human eyes to collect tears over spans that can last from hours to multiple days. The individual visits averaged around 2 minutes long, with the same worker bee visiting human eyes up to 148 times in one day. None of the bees observed drinking human tears carried pollen loads. The same was observed in the lachryphagous Pariotrigona klossi. Lisotrigona tear-collectors notably were not observed collecting salt from other sources such as sweat, which is more available and easily collected. This suggests that tear collection by Lisotrigona is driven by pursuit of proteins, not salt. Lisotrigona also often collects tears from animals which do not sweat, showing that their lachryphagy is not incidental or secondary to sudophagy. Lisotrigona generally approach human eyes in horizontal zig-zagging motion, landing gently at the corner of the eye to suck tears from between the eyelid and eyeball with their tiny proboscises. They crawl on the face with their claws retracted, making contact with the skin using only their soft tarsal pads. Bänziger describes the sensation as subtle and not bothersome—P. klossi, he notes, "gently sipped his tears in peaceful congregations"—though the effect can become irritating when large numbers of bees are involved. Lisotrigona scent-mark eyes once they finish collecting tears, making the hosts easy to locate for future visits. Exponential increases in the number of pursuant bees following the initial visit suggests that the tear-collectors recruit fellows from their colonies to imbibe in certain hosts' tears. It is unlikely that stingless bees can transmit pathogens to the eyes of their hosts.

=== Centris bees ===
Solitary hairy-legged bees (Centris sp.) in Central and South America have been observed drinking the ocular secretions of reptile species such as the Yellow-spotted River Turtle, the spectacled caiman, and the green iguana. The bees hover before the reptiles' eyes and reach in with their proboscises to drink their tears. A 2025 report of Centris longimana drinking from the eye of a black caiman found that the caiman appeared uncomfortable and attempted to drive the bee away.

== Other insects ==
Cockroaches in the Amazon have been observed feeding on the tears of anoles, which are natural predators of cockroaches. Such lachryphagy, lasting several minutes, is practiced at night, while the anole is resting, to mitigate the risk of predation. The scientists who observed this behavior, the first report of cockroach lachryphagy, linked it with the presence of nutrients essential for reproduction, particularly uric acid, in the tears of anoles.

External image
- Cockroach positioned on head of Anolis fuscoauratus, on 29 March 2019 in the Ecuadorian Amazon

Lachryphagy of birds was first observed in chewing lice in 1734, and has since been documented across 14 species belonging to 9 genera. Chewing lice have been observed feeding on the tears of both living and "freshly dead" hosts belonging to 10 families. Mey argues that lachryphagy is most likely done by lice in pursuit of water, and notes that lachryphagous lice deviate from the avoidance of light typical of lice.
