= Ophiderini =

Scientific classification
- Kingdom: Animalia
- Phylum: Arthropoda
- Class: Insecta
- Order: Lepidoptera
- Superfamily: Noctuoidea
- Family: Erebidae
- Subfamily: Calpinae
- Tribe: Ophiderini; Guenée, 1852

Tribe of moths

The Ophiderini are a tribe of moths in the family Erebidae.

== Taxonomy ==
The moths most closely related to the Ophiderini are in the tribe Calpini.

== Genera ==
The following genera are included in the tribe.

- Eudocima
- Hemiceratoides
