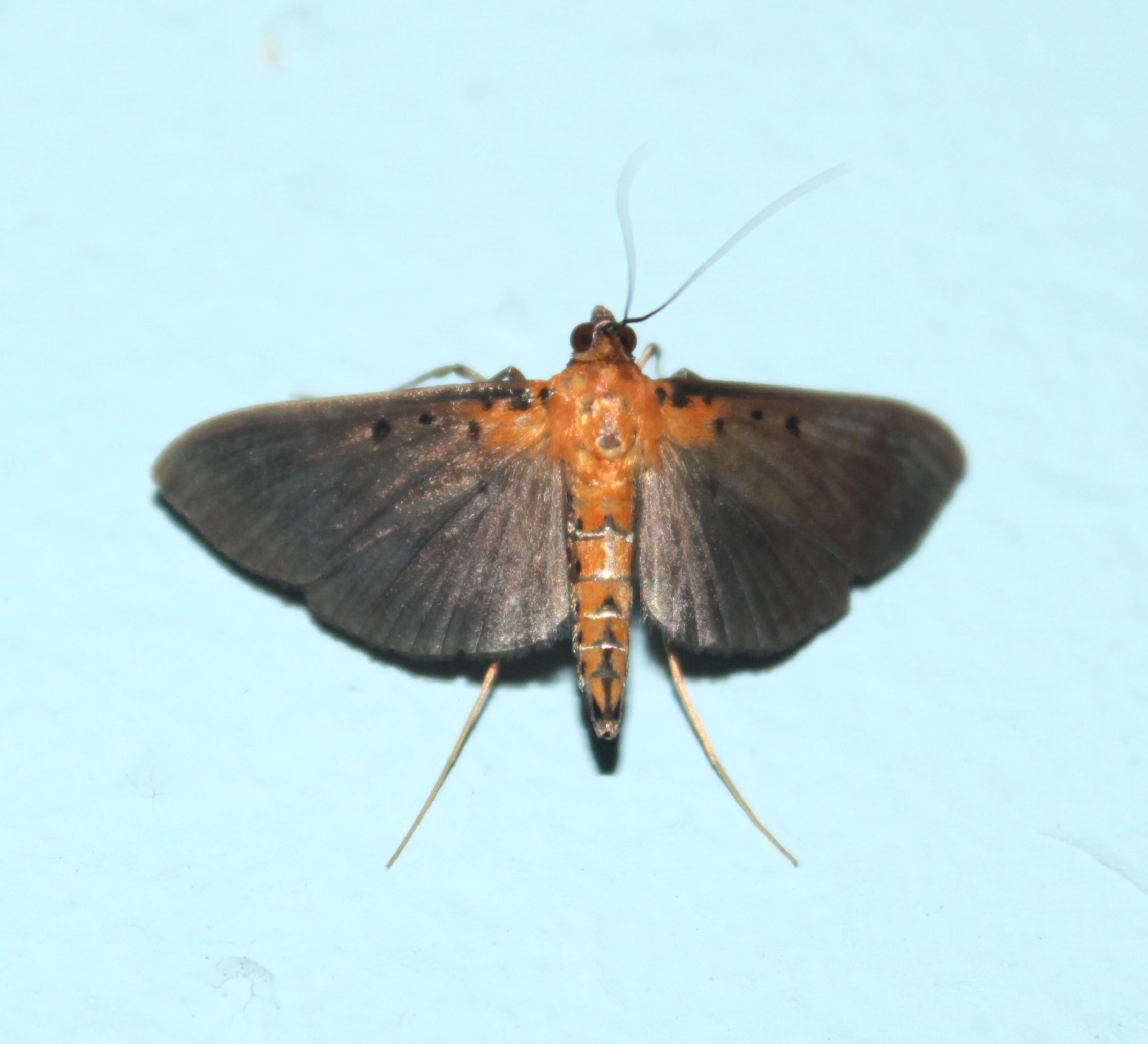
- adult
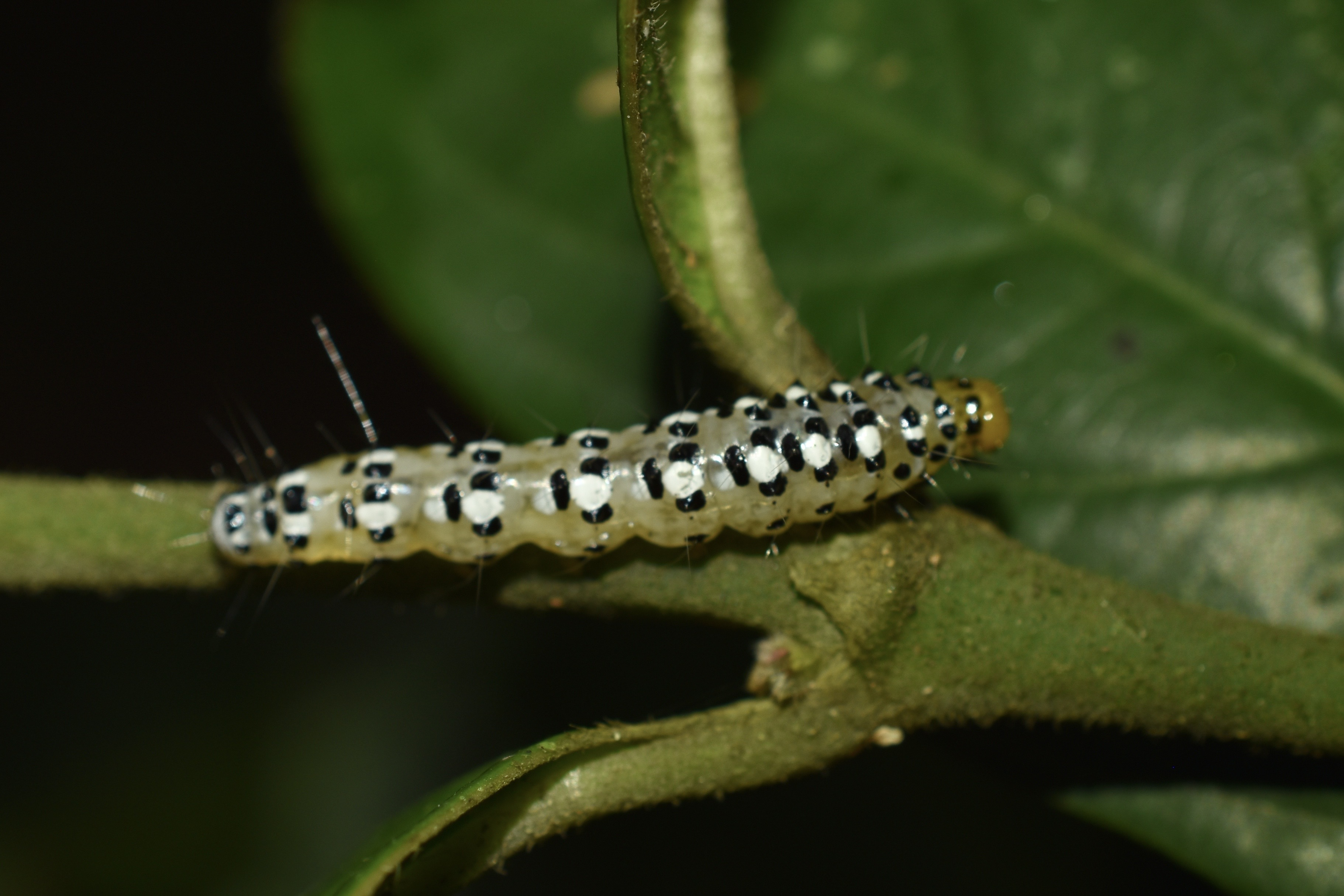
- larva

Scientific classification
- Kingdom: Animalia
- Phylum: Arthropoda
- Class: Insecta
- Order: Lepidoptera
- Family: Crambidae
- Genus: Filodes
- Species: F. fulvidorsalis

Binomial name
- Filodes fulvidorsalis (Geyer in Hübner, 1832)

Synonyms
- Pinacia fulvidorsalis Geyer in Hübner, 1832

= Filodes fulvidorsalis =

Species of moth

Filodes fulvidorsalis is a moth in the family Crambidae found in South and Southeast Asia. It was described by Carl Geyer in 1832. Specimens have been observed to practice lachryphagy.
