= Hemiceratoides =

Scientific classification
- Domain: Eukaryota
- Kingdom: Animalia
- Phylum: Arthropoda
- Class: Insecta
- Order: Lepidoptera
- Superfamily: Noctuoidea
- Family: Erebidae
- Tribe: Ophiderini
- Genus: Hemiceratoides; Strand, 1911

Genus of moths

Hemiceratoides is a genus of moths of the family Erebidae.

== Species ==
- Hemiceratoides hieroglyphica Saalmüller, 1891
- Hemiceratoides sittaca Karsch, 1896.
- Hemiceratoides vadoni Viette 1976
