= Hemiceratoides hieroglyphica =

Scientific classification
- Kingdom: Animalia
- Phylum: Arthropoda
- Clade: Pancrustacea
- Class: Insecta
- Order: Lepidoptera
- Superfamily: Noctuoidea
- Family: Erebidae
- Genus: Hemiceratoides
- Species: H. hieroglyphica

Binomial name
- Hemiceratoides hieroglyphica (Saalmüller, 1891)

Synonyms
- Calpe hieroglyphica (Saalmüller, 1891); Hemiceras hieroglyphica (Saalmüller, 1891); Hemiceratoides vadoni Viette, 1976

Species of moth

Hemiceratoides hieroglyphica is a moth from Madagascar. It was discovered in 2006 that it frequents sleeping birds at night, and drinks their tears, using a specialized, harpoon-like proboscis. Tear-feeding moths outside of Madagascar (for example Mecistoptera griseifusa in the Hypeninae subfamily) are not directly related to this species, and have evolved dissimilar mechanisms for drinking from large animals like deer or crocodiles.

The adults have a wingspan of 52 mm.

== Distribution ==
This species is known from Nigeria, South Africa and Madagascar.
