= Chaeopsestis =

Scientific classification
- Kingdom: Animalia
- Phylum: Arthropoda
- Class: Insecta
- Order: Lepidoptera
- Family: Drepanidae
- Subfamily: Thyatirinae
- Genus: Chaeopsestis; Le Cerf, 1941
- Species: C. ludovicae

Binomial name
- Chaeopsestis ludovicae Le Cerf, 1941

Monotypic moth genus in family Drepanidae

Chaeopsestis is a monotypic moth genus belonging to the family Drepaninae first described by Ferdinand Le Cerf in 1941. Its single species, Chaeopsestis ludovicae, was described in the same paper. It is found in Vietnam, Thailand and the Chinese provinces of Jiangxi, Fujian, Guangdong and Hainan.

Adults are on wing from October to November. Adults drink the tears of several animals including humans (lachryphagy). The moth attaches itself to the eyelid. It has also been recorded drinking sweat and fluids from the nose.
