= Pseudopagyda =

Scientific classification
- Kingdom: Animalia
- Phylum: Arthropoda
- Class: Insecta
- Order: Lepidoptera
- Family: Crambidae
- Subfamily: Pyraustinae
- Genus: Pseudopagyda; Slamka, 2013
- Species: P. homoculorum

Binomial name
- Pseudopagyda homoculorum (Bänziger, 1995)

Synonyms
- Microstega homoculorum Bänziger, 1995; Paratalanta homoculorum

Genus of moths

Pseudopagyda is a genus of moths in the family Crambidae. It contains three species:

- Pseudopagyda acutangulata
- Pseudopagyda homoculorum
- Pseudopagyda ingentalis

It is found in Thailand and Yunnan (China). Males drink tears of various mammals, including humans.

== Sources ==
- Chen, Kai; Zhang, Dan-Dan (2017). "Revision of the genus Pseudopagyda Slamka，2013 (Lepidoptera: Pyraloidea: Crambidae: Pyraustinae) with the first reported females". Journal of Environmental Entomology. 39 (3): 580–587. ISSN 1674-0858.
- Chen, Kai; Zhang, Dandan; Li, Houhun (2018-11-28). "Systematics of the new genus Spinosuncus Chen, Zhang & Li with descriptions of four new species (Lepidoptera, Crambidae, Pyraustinae)". ZooKeys (799): 115–151. Bibcode:2018ZooK..799..115C. doi:10.3897/zookeys.799.23925. ISSN 1313-2970. PMC 6281707. PMID 30532620.
