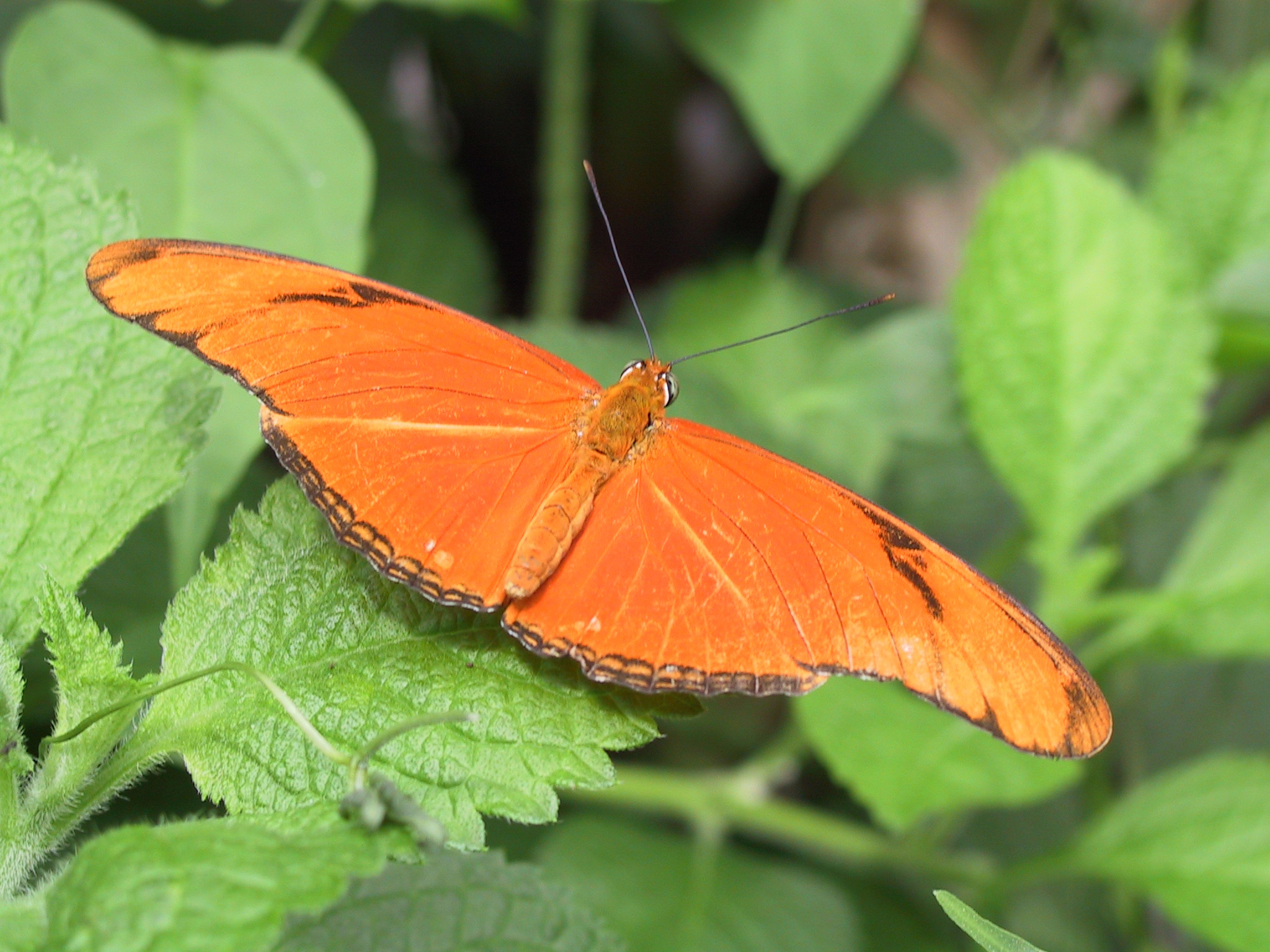
- Dorsal view
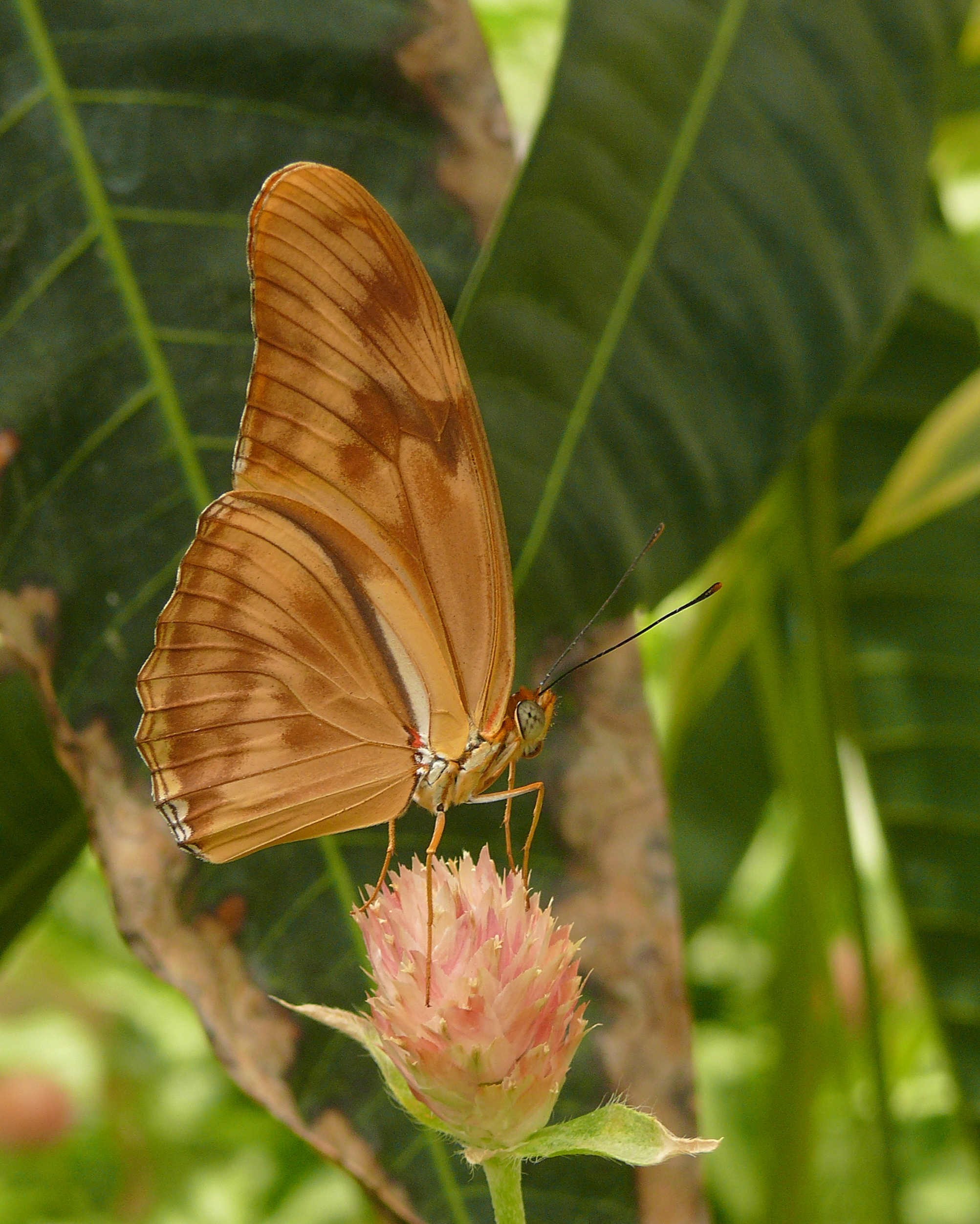
- Side view

Scientific classification
- Kingdom: Animalia
- Phylum: Arthropoda
- Clade: Pancrustacea
- Class: Insecta
- Order: Lepidoptera
- Family: Nymphalidae
- Subfamily: Heliconiinae
- Genus: Dryas; Hübner, 1807
- Species: D. iulia

Binomial name
- Dryas iulia (Fabricius, 1775)

Subspecies
- 14, see text

Synonyms
- Genus synonymy: Alcionea Rafinesque, 1815; Colaenis Hübner, 1819; Species synonymy: Papilio iulia Fabricius, 1775; Papilio julia (misspelling); Dryas julia (misspelling)

= Dryas iulia =

Species of butterfly

Dryas iulia (often incorrectly spelled julia), commonly called the Julia butterfly, Julia heliconian, the flame, or flambeau, is a species of brush-footed (or nymphalid) butterfly. The sole representative of its genus Dryas, it is native from Brazil to southern Texas and Florida, and in summer can sometimes be found as far north as eastern Nebraska. Over 15 subspecies have been described.

Its wingspan ranges from 82 to 92 mm, and it is colored orange (brighter in male specimens) with black markings; this species is somewhat unpalatable to birds and belongs to the "orange" Müllerian mimicry complex.

This butterfly is a fast flier and frequents clearings, paths, and margins of forests and woodlands. It feeds on the nectar of flowers, such as lantanas (Lantana) and shepherd's-needle (Scandix pecten-veneris), and drinks the tears of caiman, the eye of which the butterfly irritates to produce tears. Its caterpillar feeds on leaves of passion vines, including Passiflora affinis and yellow passionflower (P. lutea) in Texas.

Its mating behavior is complex and involves a prolonged courtship whose outcome appears to be controlled by the female. This raises questions pertaining to the occurrence of the evolution of sexual conflict.

The species is popular in butterfly houses because it is long-lived and active throughout the day. However, the caterpillars are spiky and may cause a skin rash.

== Identification ==
Dryas iulia is characterized by elongated orange wings with black wing markings that vary by subspecies. Black markings are mainly located near the wing tips. Male Julia butterflies can be identified by their brighter orange color, compared to the duller orange exhibited by females. Images of many Julia butterfly subspecies can be found at the bottom of the page.

== Distribution ==
Dryas iulia is common in the tropical and subtropical areas of North, Central, and South America. In South America, throughout countries like Brazil, Ecuador, and Bolivia, the Julia butterfly is commonly distributed. The butterfly is also widespread throughout a number of the Caribbean islands, with endemic subspecies located in Cuba, Dominica, the Bahamas, and Puerto Rico, among others. Moving further north, the species can be commonly witnessed in Central America up into Texas and Florida (and can occasionally be found to move into the Nebraska area during the summer). The geographic distribution of D. iulia overlaps with the ranges of other butterflies which sometimes leads to conflict. For example, the ranges of D. iulia and the gulf fritillary overlap; in some cases, gulf fritillaries can sometimes be subjected to competition and fighting from Dryas iulia moderata when the two species have breeding populations in similar areas and within the same geographic range.

=== Habitat ===
D. iulia prefer open, sunny breaks in the subtropical and tropical forests it inhabits. The butterfly is also common in open areas such as gardens, cattle grazing lands, and forest clearings, due to human impact. D. iulia can be found on a few main hostplants (or shrubs in Latin America) including the passion vine of the family Passifloraceae.

=== Migration ===
D. iulia flights take place throughout the year in southern Florida and southern Texas, but especially during the fall. The butterfly in its U.S. range has been seen to occasionally migrate as far north as Nebraska. However, south of its United States range, the Julia butterfly generally does not migrate. The butterfly's flight pattern can be fast or slow, and is usually seen around the middle story of their forest habitat.

== Food resources ==
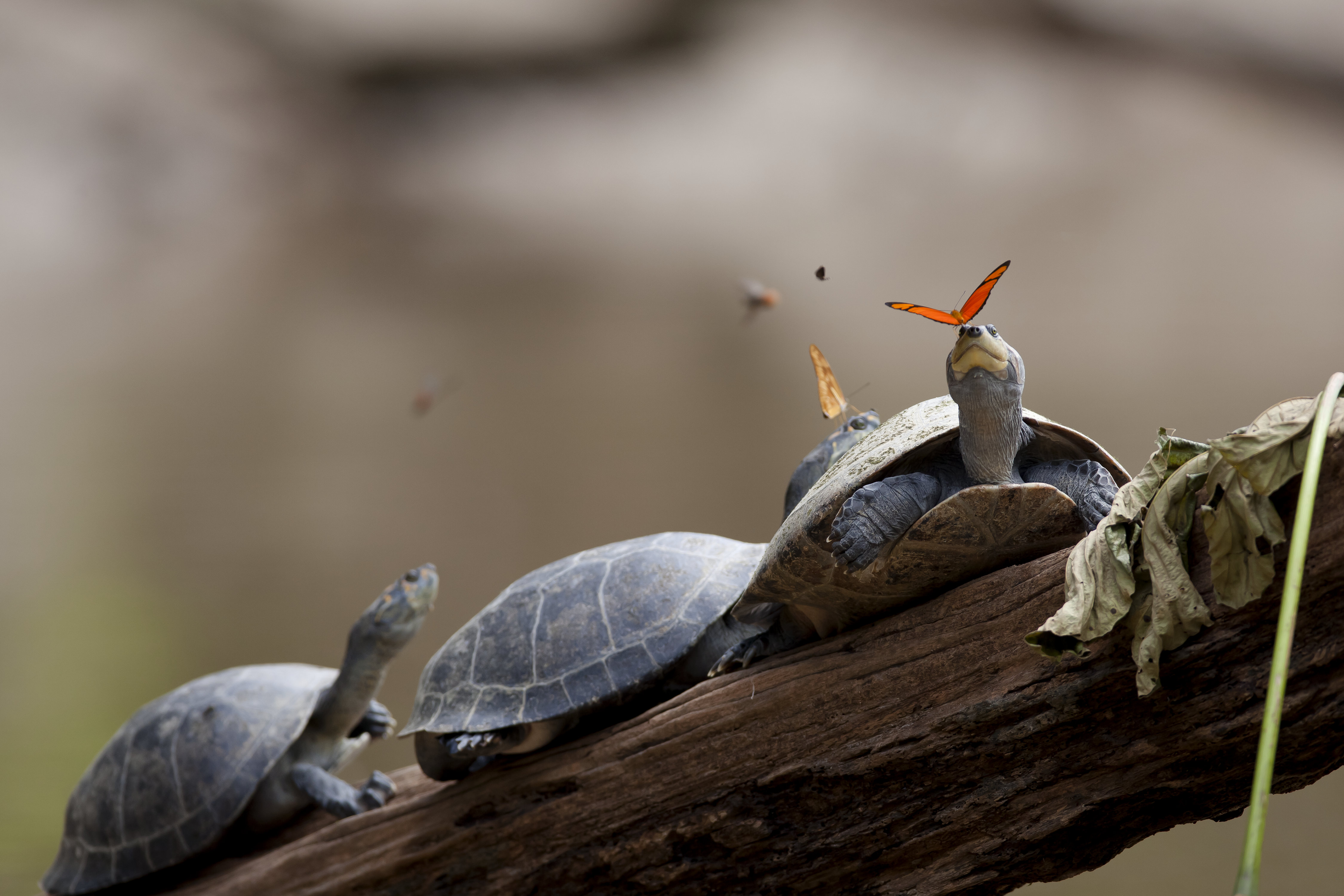
Two Julia butterflies drinking tears from turtles in Ecuador

Dryas iulia larvae feed on Passiflora plants almost exclusively, specifically those of subgenuses Astrophea (also known as Passiflora), Polyanthea, Tryphostemmatoides, and Plectostemma.

As adults, males and females feed differently based on their reproductive needs. As mentioned further down, males engage in mud-puddling behavior in order to gain valuable minerals for their spermatophores. They have also been seen to agitate the eyes of caimans and turtles in order to produce tears that the butterflies can drink. Observations of this from points 1500 km apart, were probably the first time scientific observations were coordinated via films broadcast on terrestrial television.

Females, meanwhile, besides visiting certain flower species for their nectar, like Lantana and Eupatorium (as both male and female D. iulia butterflies do) – also use pollen from flowers to gain nutrients needed for egg production.

=== Hostplant coevolutionary strategies ===
Passiflora vines and D. iulia (among other Heliconian butterflies) have shown strong evidence of coevolution, as the butterflies attempt to gain better survival for their laid eggs and the plants attempt to stop their destruction from larval feeding. Many members of the genus Passiflora have evolved to produce very tough, thick leaves that are hard to break down by caterpillars. Some Passiflora vines have gone further by producing small leaves that look like a perfect place for the butterflies to lay eggs but break off at the stem within a few days, carrying the D. iulia eggs with them. Other Passiflora vines actually mimic eggs of the butterfly species that use it as a hostplant, so that a passing butterfly thinks the plant already has eggs on it and consequently does not oviposit. The butterflies have thus evolved to be more discerning in their egg placement, and better able to detect strategies used by their host plant, the Passiflora.

=== Mud-puddling behavior ===
Mud-puddling is a peculiar social behavior engaged in by a number of butterfly species, including D. iulia. It involves male butterflies crowding around damp ground in order to drink dissolved minerals through a process of water filtration. During copulation, the male butterfly uses minerals in his spermatophore, which must be replenished before the following mating. When a male finds a suitable spot for the behavior, other males can quickly join and hundreds of butterflies may become attracted to the site. Multiple species may join the group, but the butterflies do not evenly distribute between species. Instead, D. iulia and others usually remain near members of their own species.

== Protective coloration ==
Dryas iulia butterflies are part of the "orange" Müllerian mimicry complex, one of the similar Heliconian species that employ this protective tactic. Passifloracae, the primary food source of D. iulia caterpillars, contains trace amounts of cyanide. This has led to the development of cyanogenic glycosides that make the butterfly unpalatable to its predators, which come from a mixture of storage from their hostplant and larval synthesis. The mimicry in D. iulia involves other butterfly species having evolved to look similar to the Julia butterfly in order to convey their presumed unpalatability.

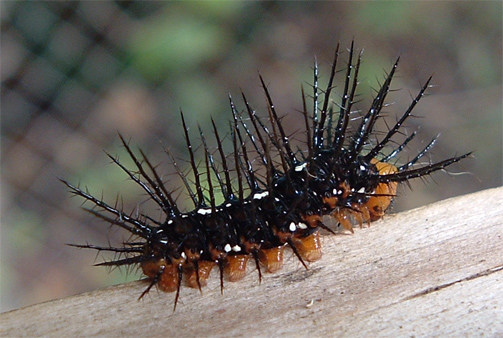
D. iulia caterpillar with spikes

== Life history ==
=== Egg ===
Dryas iulia eggs tend to be a light yellow color when laid, which turns to a darker orange or brown shade before hatching. Each of the butterfly's eggs are separately laid onto new leaf tendrils of its host plant, usually the passionflower vine.

The egg of the butterfly measures about 1.2 mm in height and 1.0 mm in diameter. They have approximately 20 vertical ridges and 13 horizontal ridges.

=== Larva ===
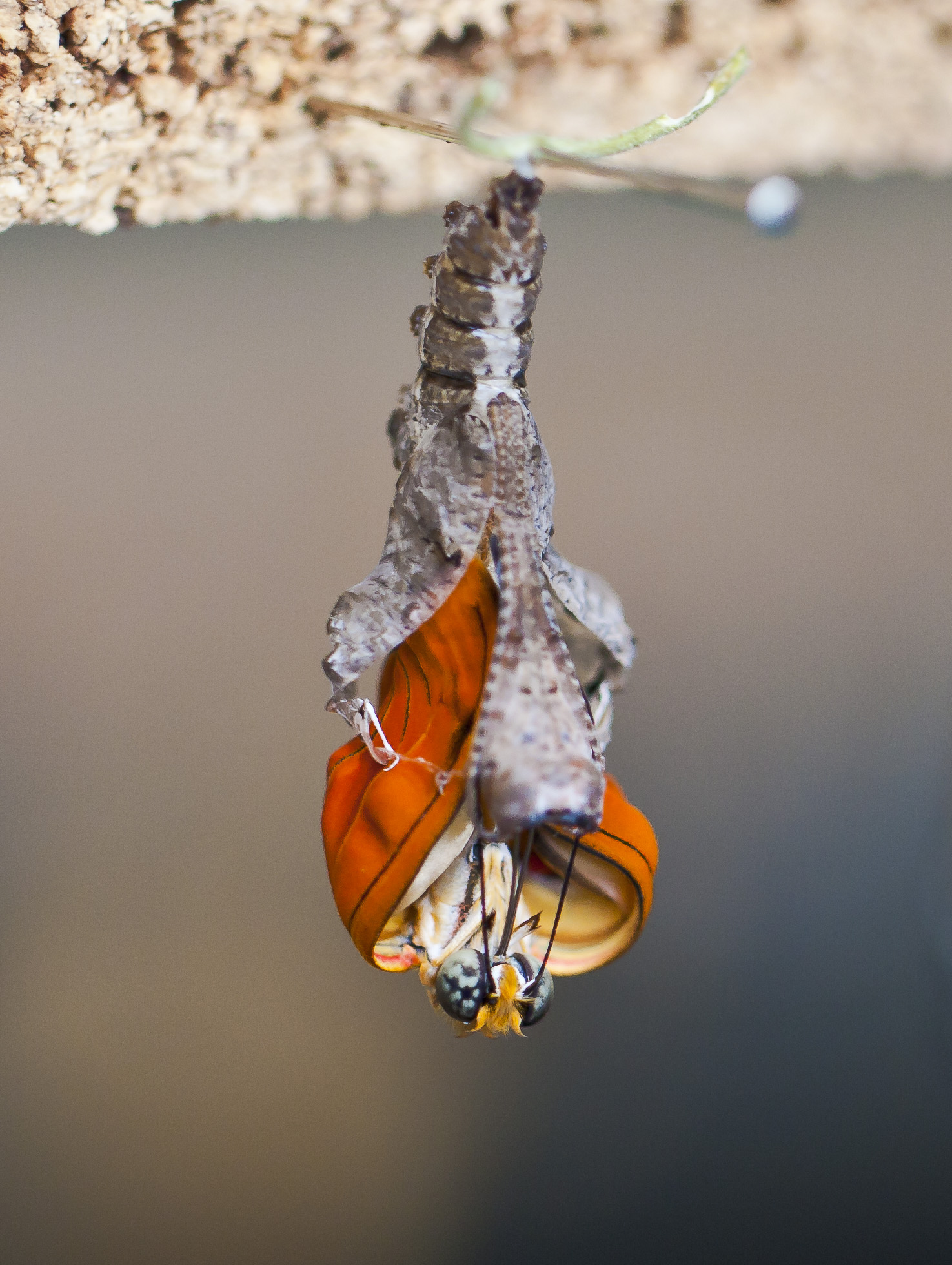
D. iulia emerging from its pupa

D. iulia caterpillars eat slots into the leaves of their hostplant once they emerge from their egg. However, they do not have nests in their hostplants. They instead use the remaining part of the leaf as a protected area to rest on.

The caterpillars of the Julia butterfly have pink, gray, and black coloration throughout their body with maroon and cream patches. Long, branched, black spines also cover their entire body. A cream-colored, inverted Y-shaped mark can be seen on the front of the caterpillar's head.

Larvae emit noxious chemicals in their larval stage because of the trace cyanide in their hostplant. This makes the larvae unpalatable to certain bird species, especially tanagers.

=== Pupa ===
D. iulia has five larval stages, and at the fifth, the larva becomes a pupa. The pupa of the Julia butterfly is grayish-white in color, and somewhat resembles a dead leaf.

=== Adult ===
After emerging from their chrysalis, the male Julia butterfly spends the majority of its time looking for mates. At night, the butterfly roosts close to the ground, either in a small group or alone. D. iulia's adult lifespan lasts for less than a month.

== Reproduction ==
=== Courtship behavior ===
Courtship behavior in Dryas iulia involves a very specific sequence of steps that can be categorized into three sequential phases: an aerial phase, an air-ground phase, and a ground phase. The observed courtship steps are outlined in detail below:

First, the male D. iulia approaches the female from behind. Then, the female takes flight, with the male flying in front of and above the female. This position is taken by the male so that the female can smell the male's scent scales and become sexually stimulated. Next, the female attempts to fly higher than the male, which can be seen as an anti-copulatory behavior, before landing. After that, the male D. iulia continues to beat his wings above and in front of the female, while both face the same direction. The female butterfly then opens and vibrates her hind wings and front wings. Her hind wings are fully opened, while her forewings are only partially so. At the same time, the female emits scent glands from her raised abdomen. The male then beats his wings behind and then in front of the female once again. If the female is satisfied by the courtship, she lowers her abdomen and shuts her wings in preparation for mating.

=== Mating behavior ===
Mating can occur within two weeks of the Julia butterfly's exit from the chrysalis. As adults, male D. iulia spend the majority of their time searching for females to mate with. Females of this butterfly species can mate four times in their lifetime, which is unusual for female Heliconius butterflies who generally mate just once.

Many mating behaviors in D. iulia are sex-specific and can include receptive and non-receptive behaviors by the females of the species. Some female behaviors regarded as showing non-receptiveness include abdomen raising and overflight, in which the female attempts to fly higher than the male during the aerial phase of courtship. On the other hand, a female behavior such as shutting her wings has been found to be a key receptive behavior. For males, persistence did not seem to be a key driver of success, as behaviors performed by persistent males, such as hovering over the female did not often lead to copulation.

The inability of persistent males—meaning those that carried on extended courtship behavior – to increase copulation has led to researchers theorizing female copulation acceptance as the primary determinant of successful copulation in D. iulia. For example, the only male behavioral acts found to be indicative of successful copulation occurred in response to signals of female receptiveness.

=== Evolutionary basis of sexual selection and conflict ===
Julia butterfly copulation is always terminated by the males after the ground phase. The female remains at the mating site as the male flies away. This raises the idea of an evolutionary basis for this behavior based on a conflict of interests between males and females of the species. This conflict arises because of a difference in reproductive interests between the male and the female that has its beginnings in anisogamy. Sexual selection studies favor forms of sexual conflict such as this one to be one of the major sources of speciation in certain insects.

The methods of mate selection (by which a female accepts or denies a male suitor) are not completely understood. Some studies have reported the sexual dimorphism (of color and body size) of the butterfly as a key factor that may suggest an evolutionary basis towards understanding sexual selection. D. iulia male butterflies have been seen to chase females of butterfly species with similar visual cues, which has led researchers to believe that these visual recognition strategies form the basis of sexual partner selection in this species. However, more research is needed to identify how different aspects of D. iulia's physical features factor into mate selection.

== Interaction with humans ==
When Dryas iulia are caterpillars, they can cause a skin rash on humans if touched. This is likely from the yellow liquid that is produced from the tips of the long, black spines that cover its body, which is emitted as a predator deterrent related to their cyanogenic glycosides

=== Introduced invasiveness ===
D. iulia are commonly admired for their coloration. As a diurnal species of butterfly that is quite active during the day, Julia butterfly are often found in butterfly houses. One butterfly house in Phuket, Thailand, obtained Julia butterflies, specifically Dryas iulia moderata from an exporter butterfly farm in Costa Rica and released them during Buddhist ceremonies and weddings. The released butterflies have now colonized areas of Thailand and Malaysia and established a wild population. D. iulia are now too widespread in the region to eradicate. They feed on invasive Passiflora species around its invasive range, usually Passiflora suberosa and sometimes Passiflora foetida.

== Subspecies ==
Listed alphabetically:

- D. i. alcionea (Cramer, 1779) – (Suriname, Bolivia, Brazil)
- D. i. carteri (Riley, 1926) – (Bahamas)
- D. i. delila (Fabricius, 1775) – (Jamaica)
- D. i. dominicana (Hall, 1917) – (Dominica)
- D. i. framptoni (Riley, 1926) – (St. Vincent)
- D. i. fucatus (Boddaert, 1783) – (Dominican Republic)
- D. i. iulia (Fabricius, 1775) – (Puerto Rico)
- D. i. largo (Clench, 1975) – (Florida)
- D. i. lucia (Riley, 1926) – (St. Lucia)
- D. i. martinica (Enrico & Pinchon, 1969) – (Martinique)
- D. i. moderata (Riley, 1926) – (Mexico, Honduras, Ecuador)
- D. i. nudeola (Bates, 1934) – (Cuba)
- D. i. warneri (Hall, 1936) – (St. Kitts)
- D. i. zoe (Miller & Steinhauser, 1992) – (Cayman Islands)
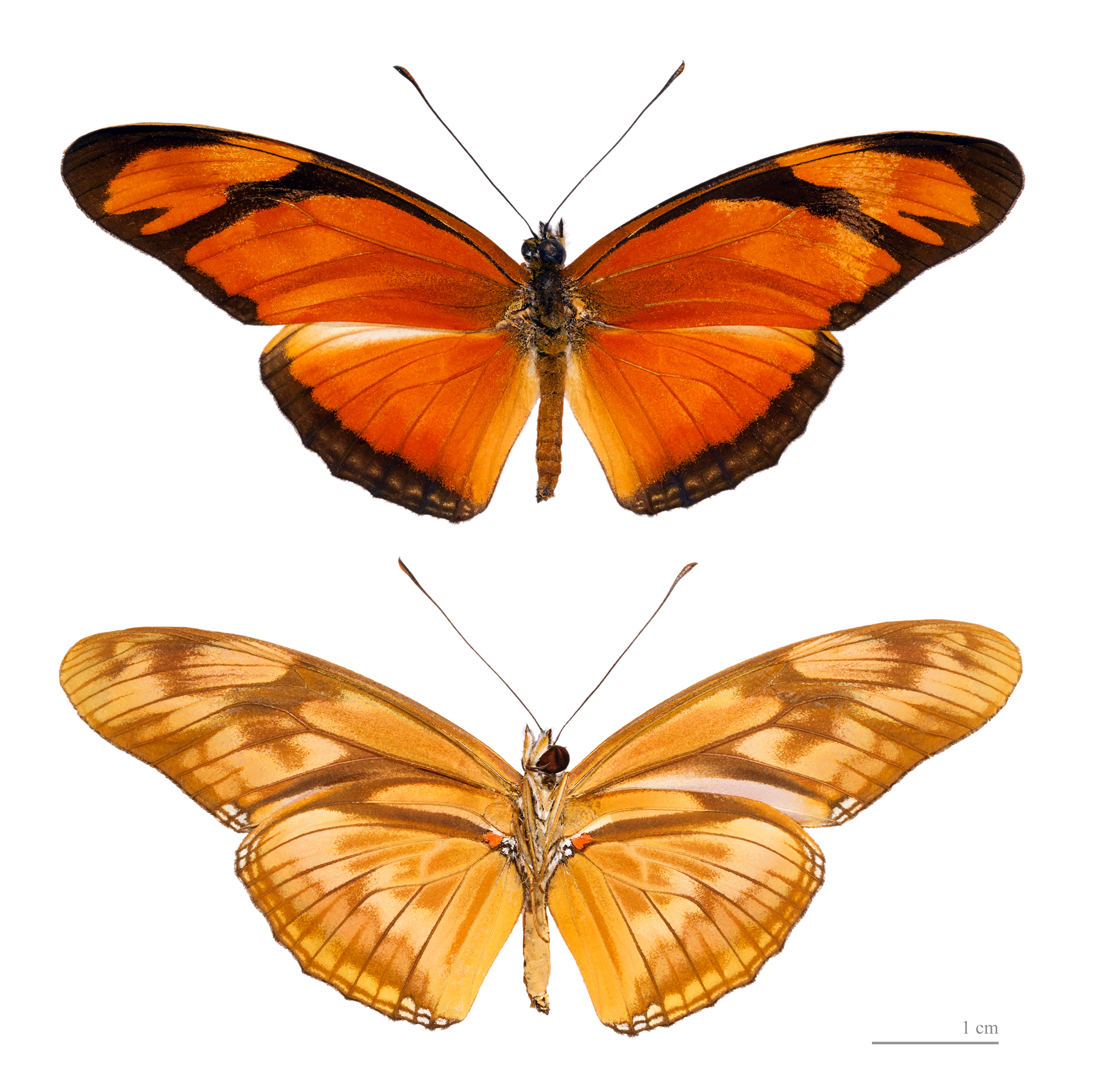
D. i. alcionea – MHNT

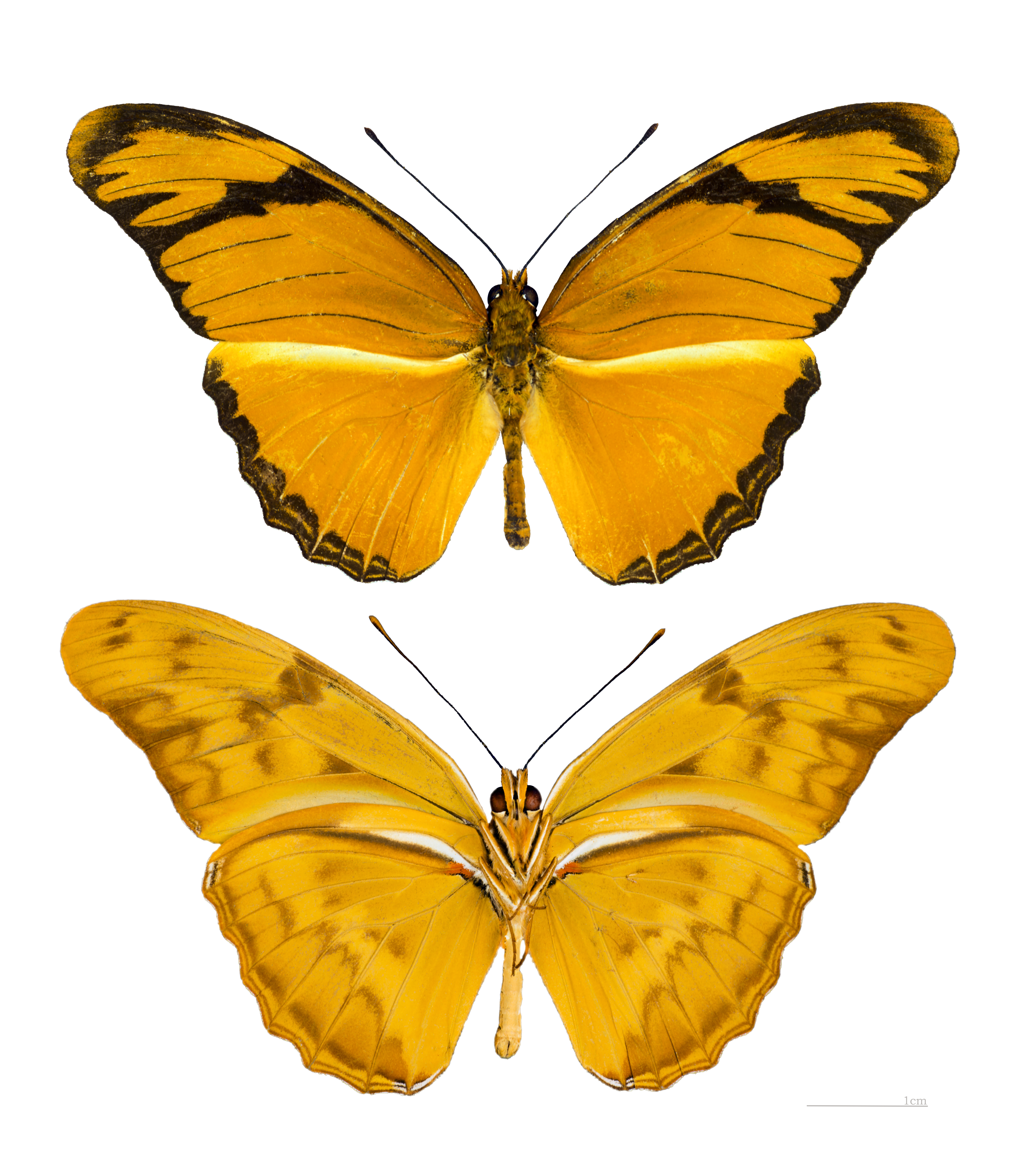
D. i. dominicana MHNT

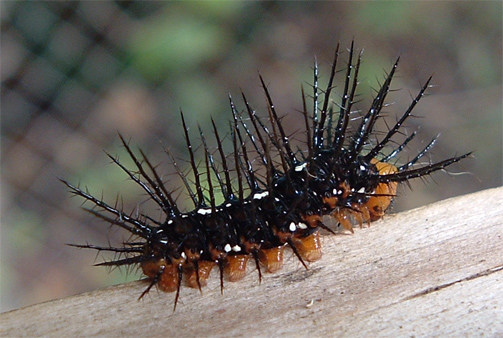
Caterpillar

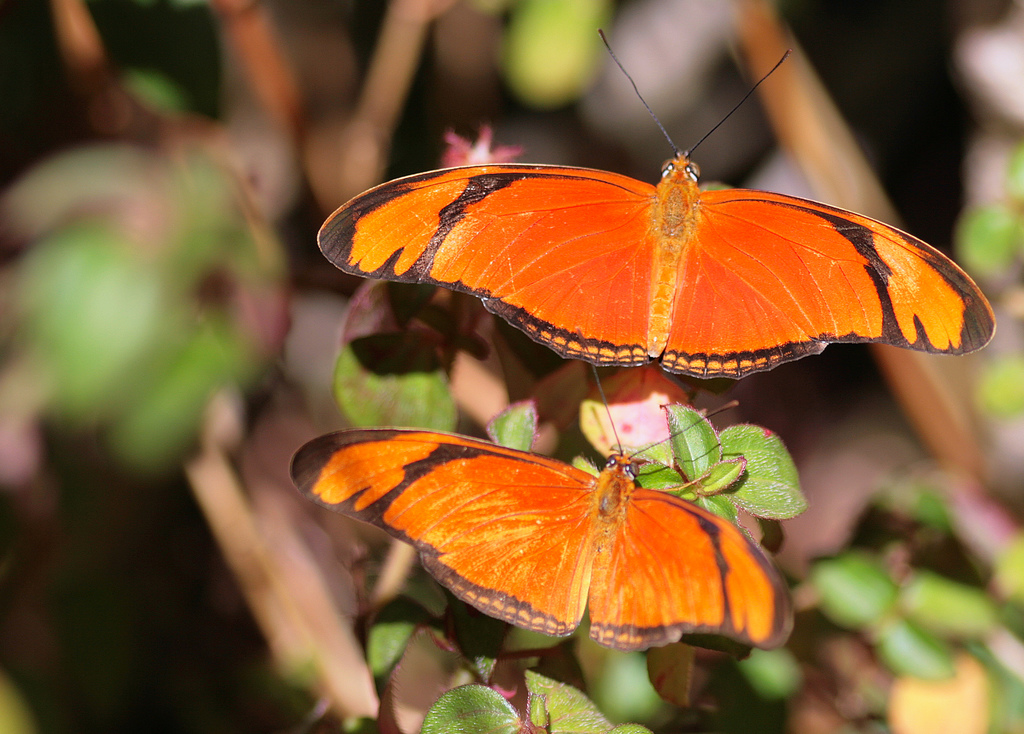
D. i. alcionea
Brazil

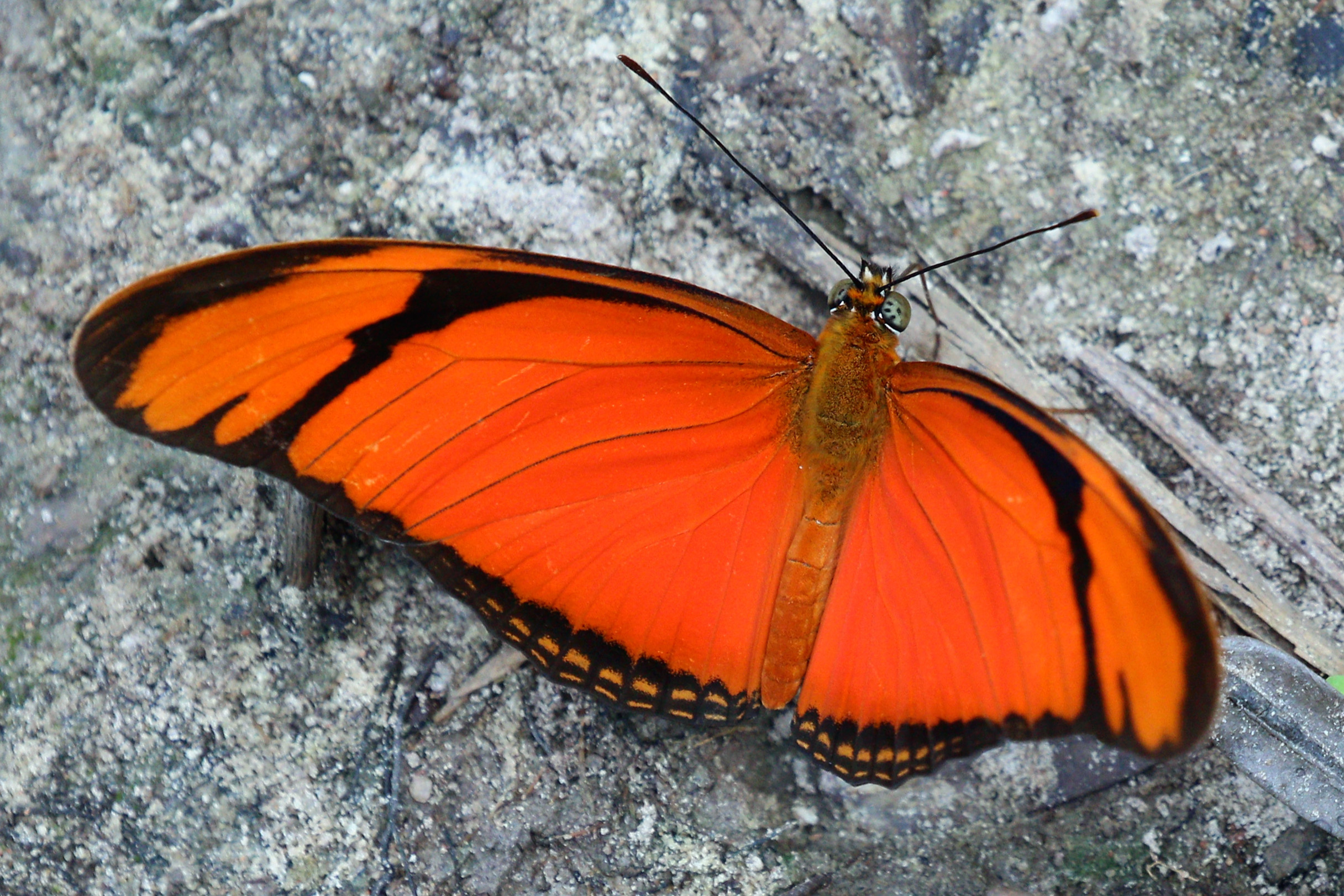
D. i. alcionea
Brazil

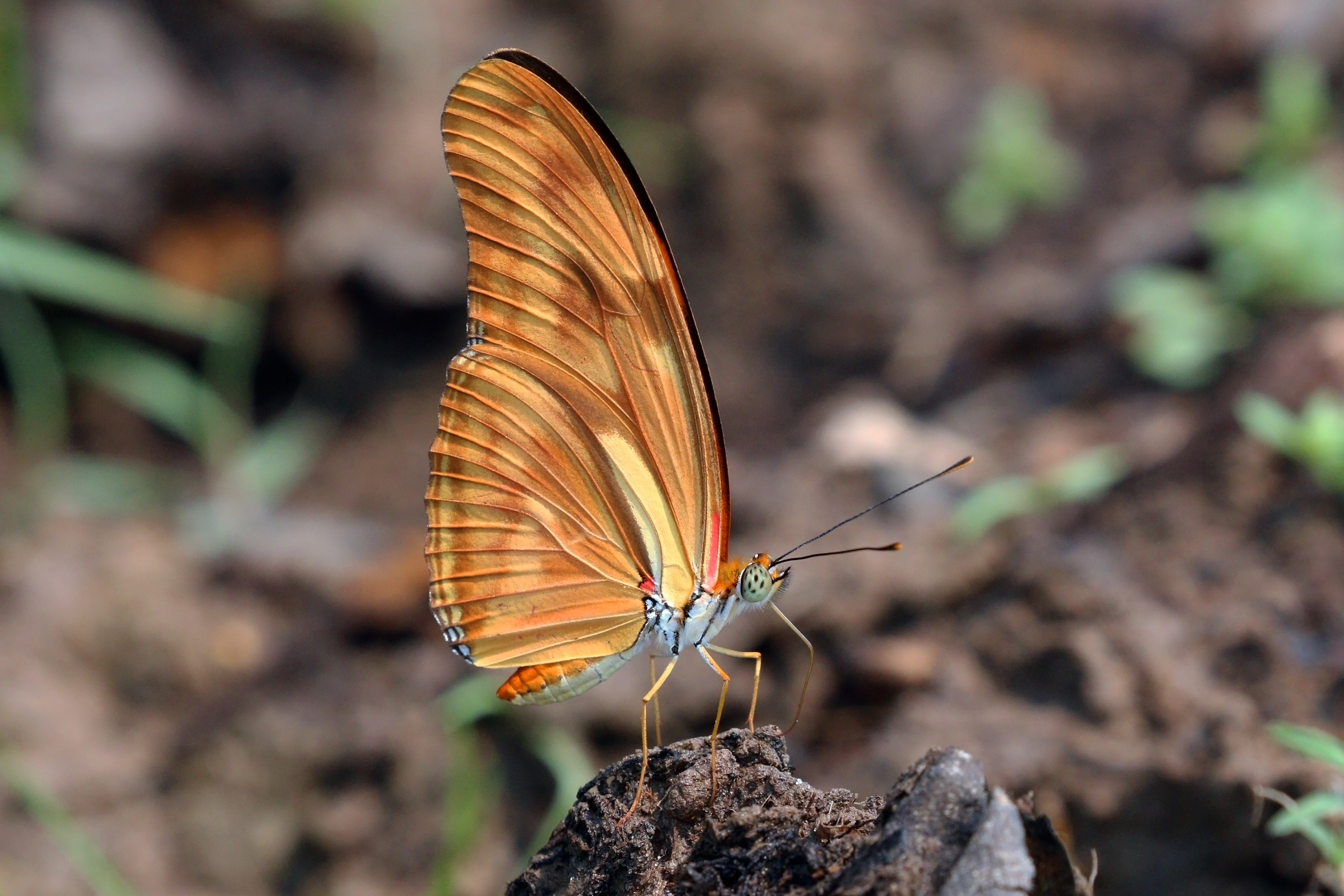
D. i. alcionea
Brazil

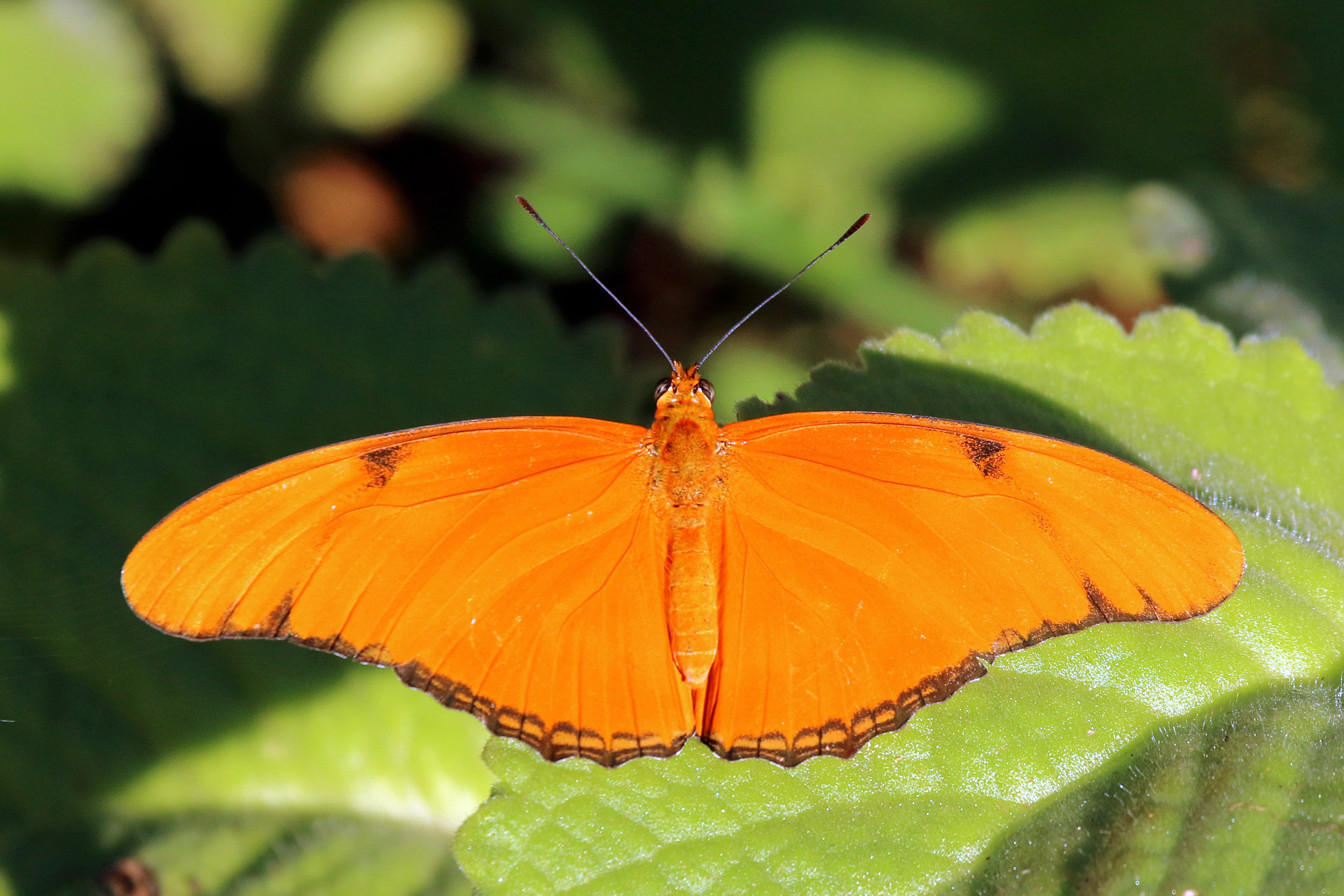
D. i. delila
female, Jamaica

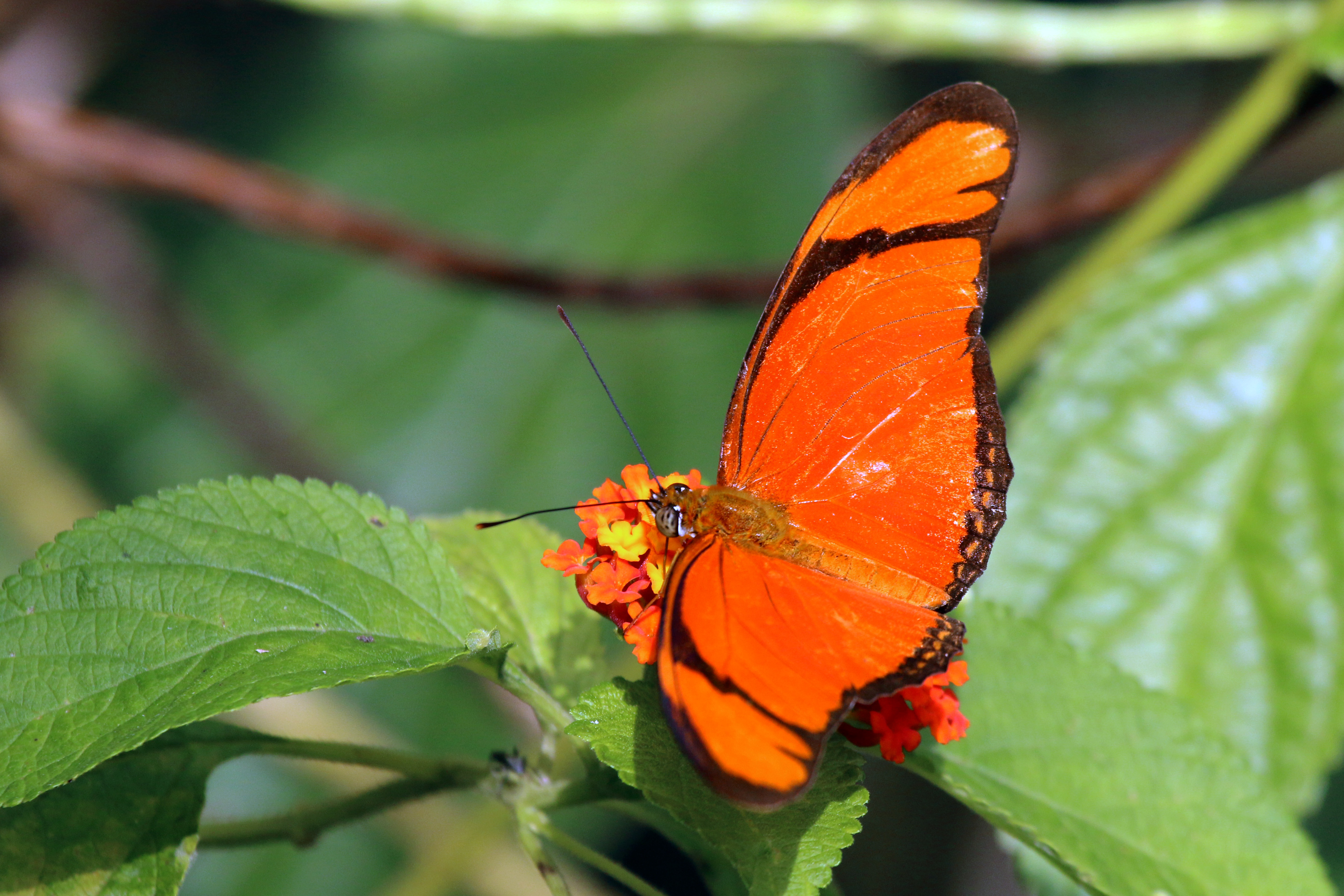
D. i. iulia
male, Trinidad

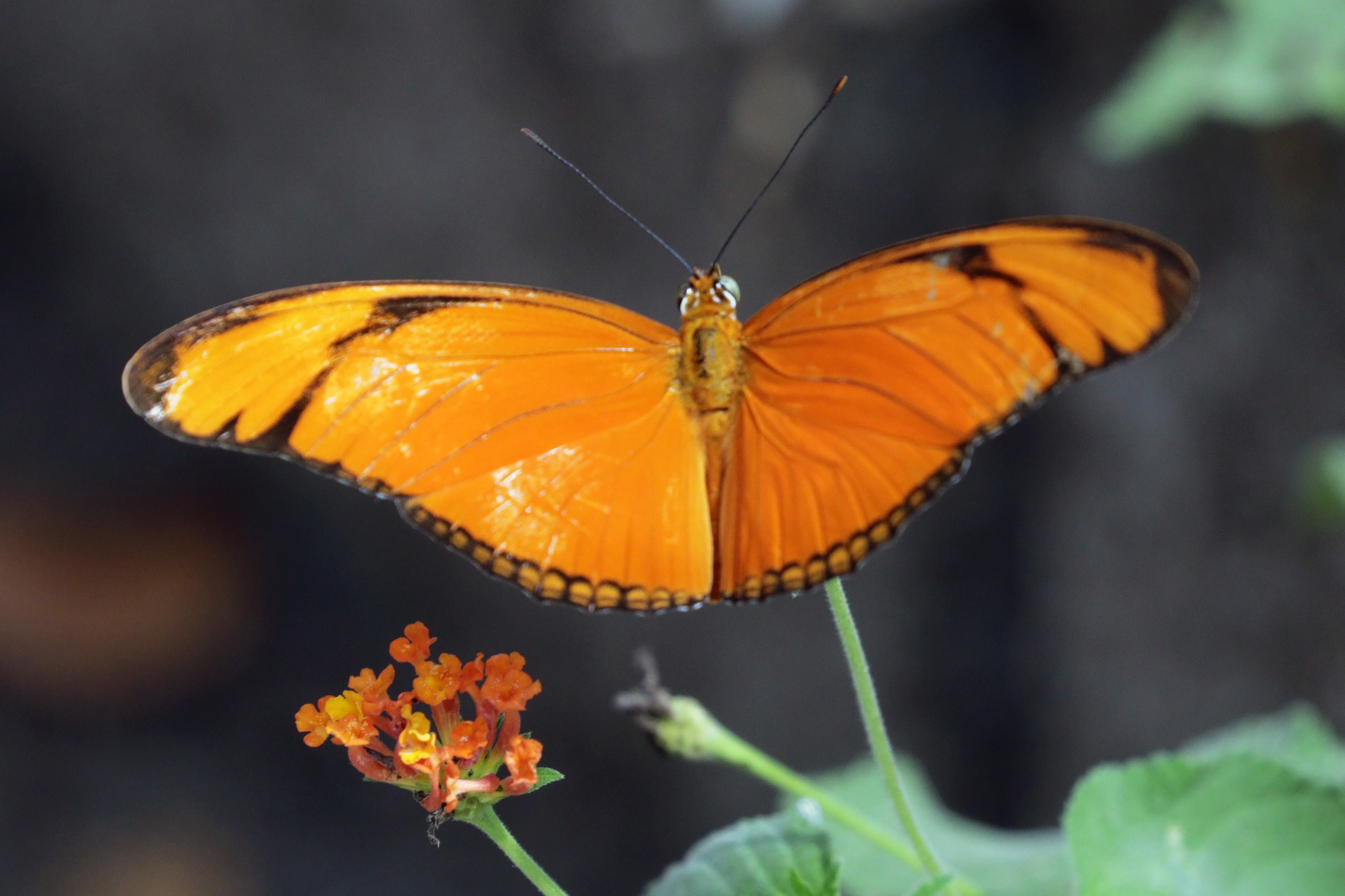
D. i. moderata
Panama

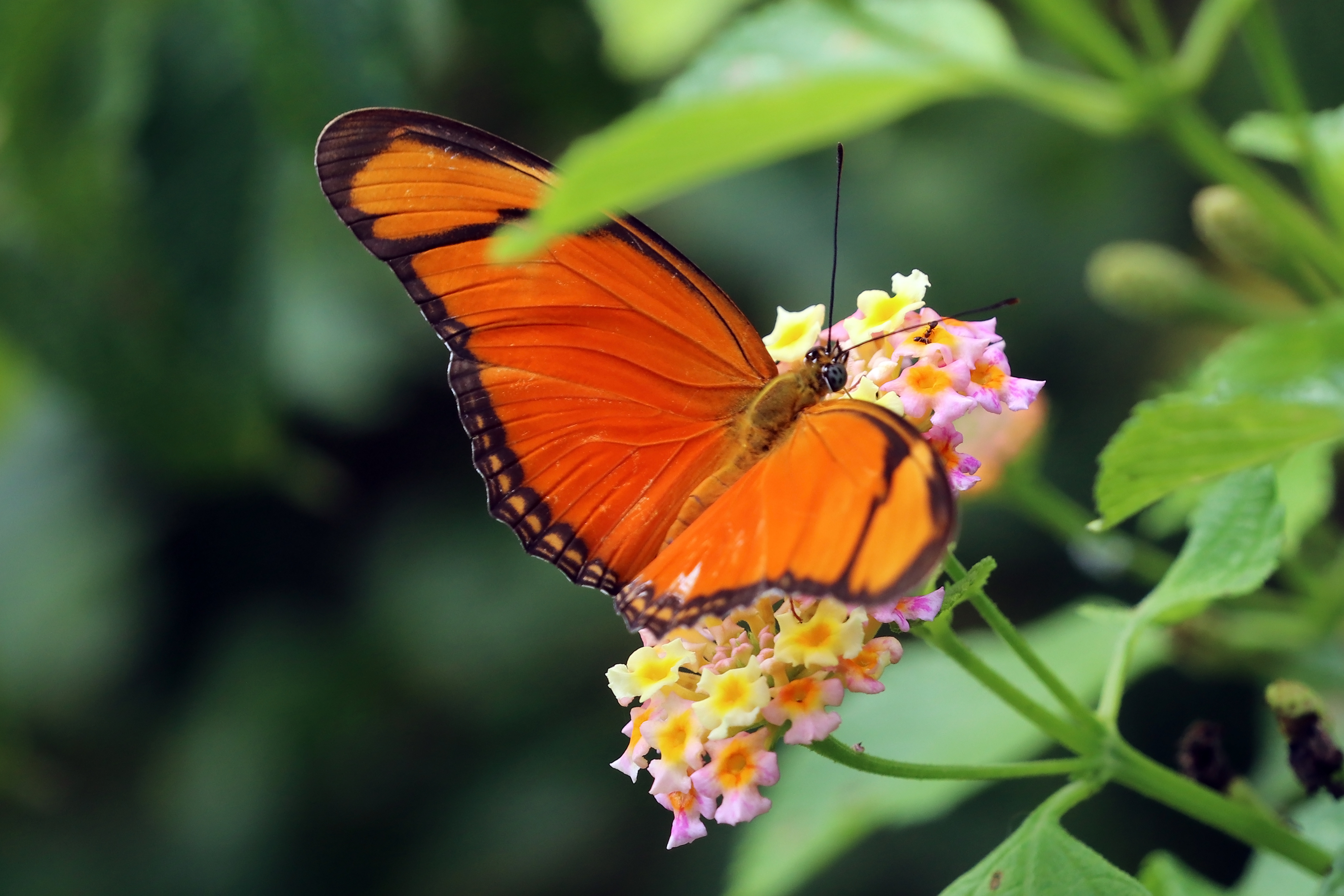
D. i. moderata
Panama

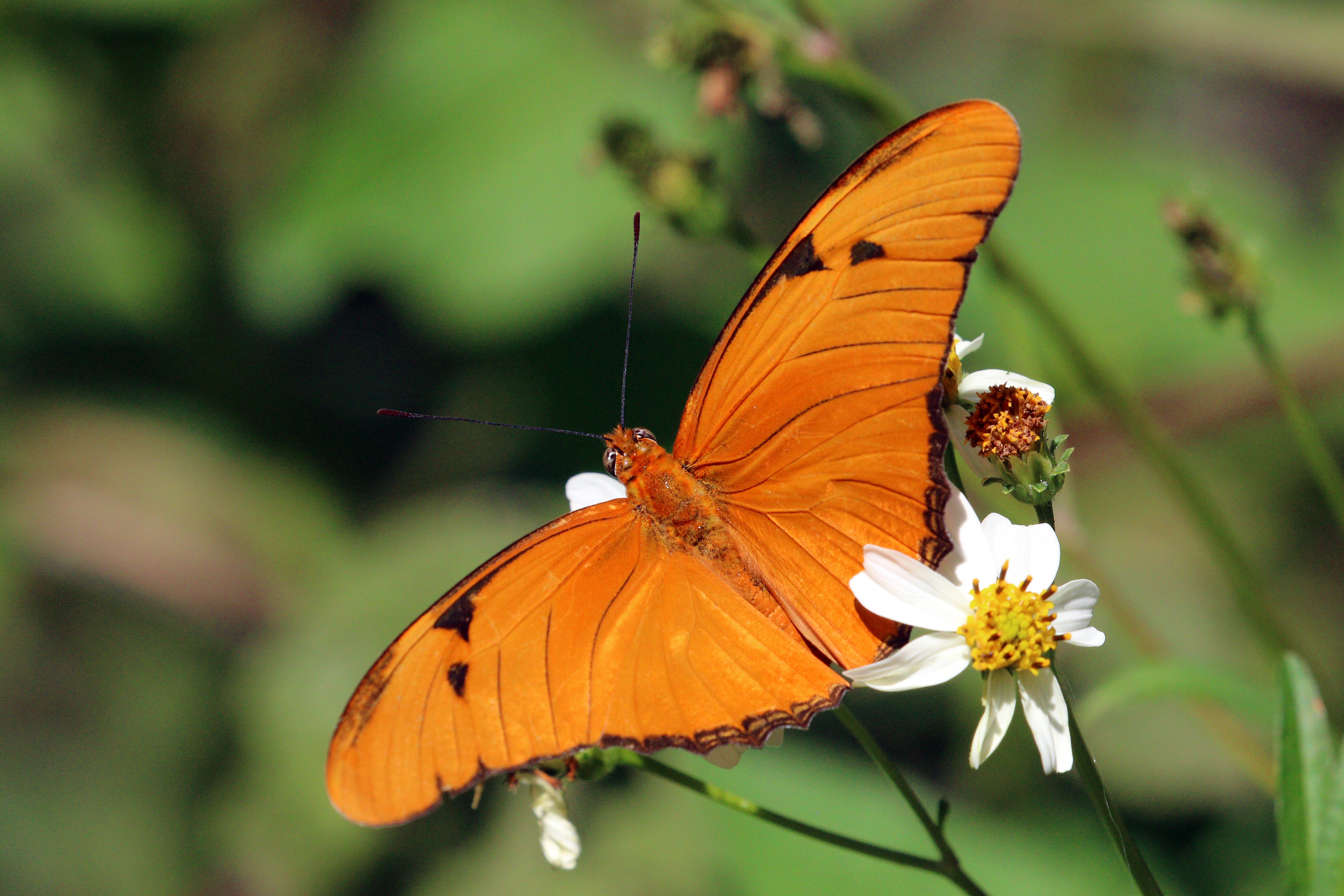
D. i. nudeola
male, Cuba

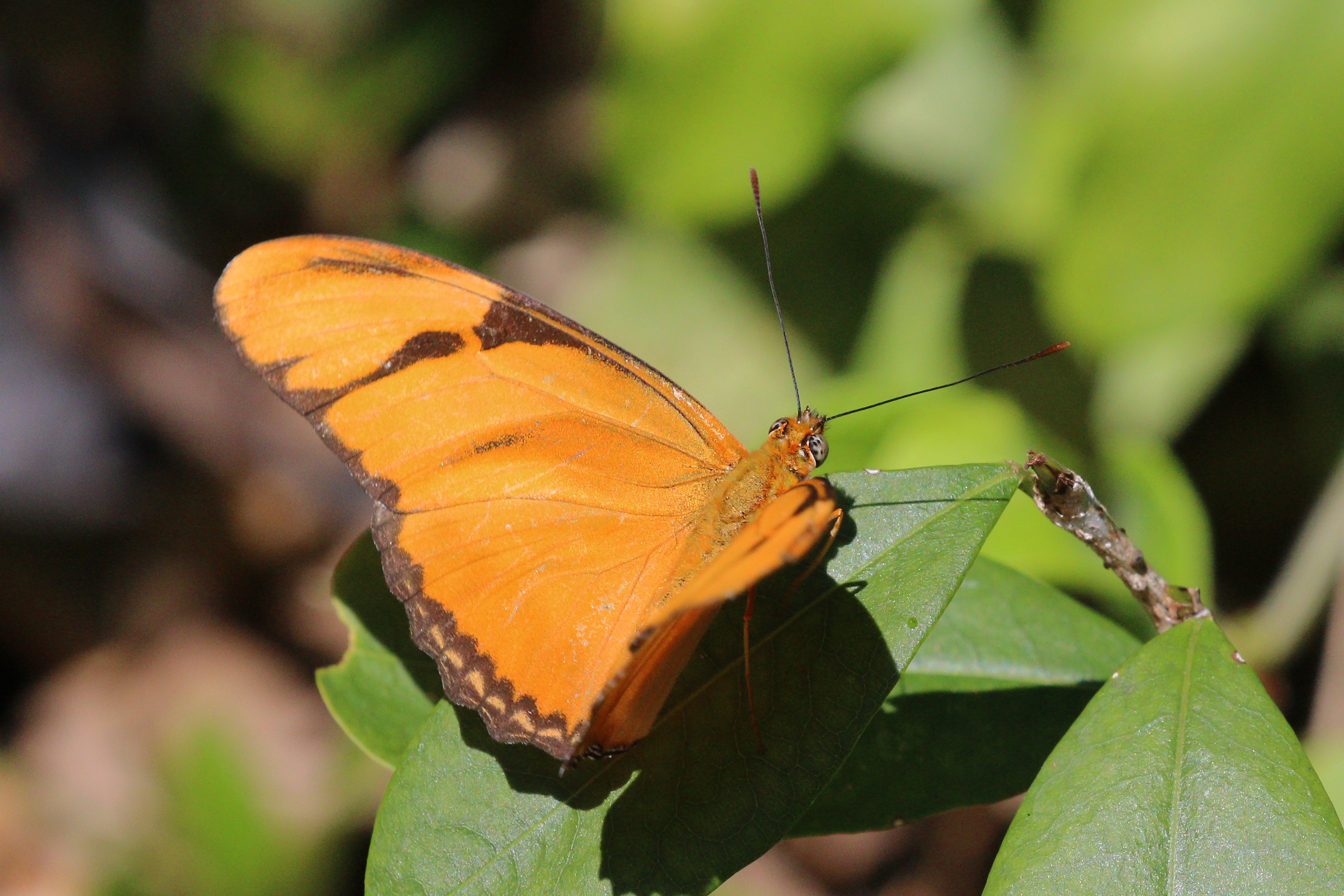
D. i. nudeola
female, Cuba

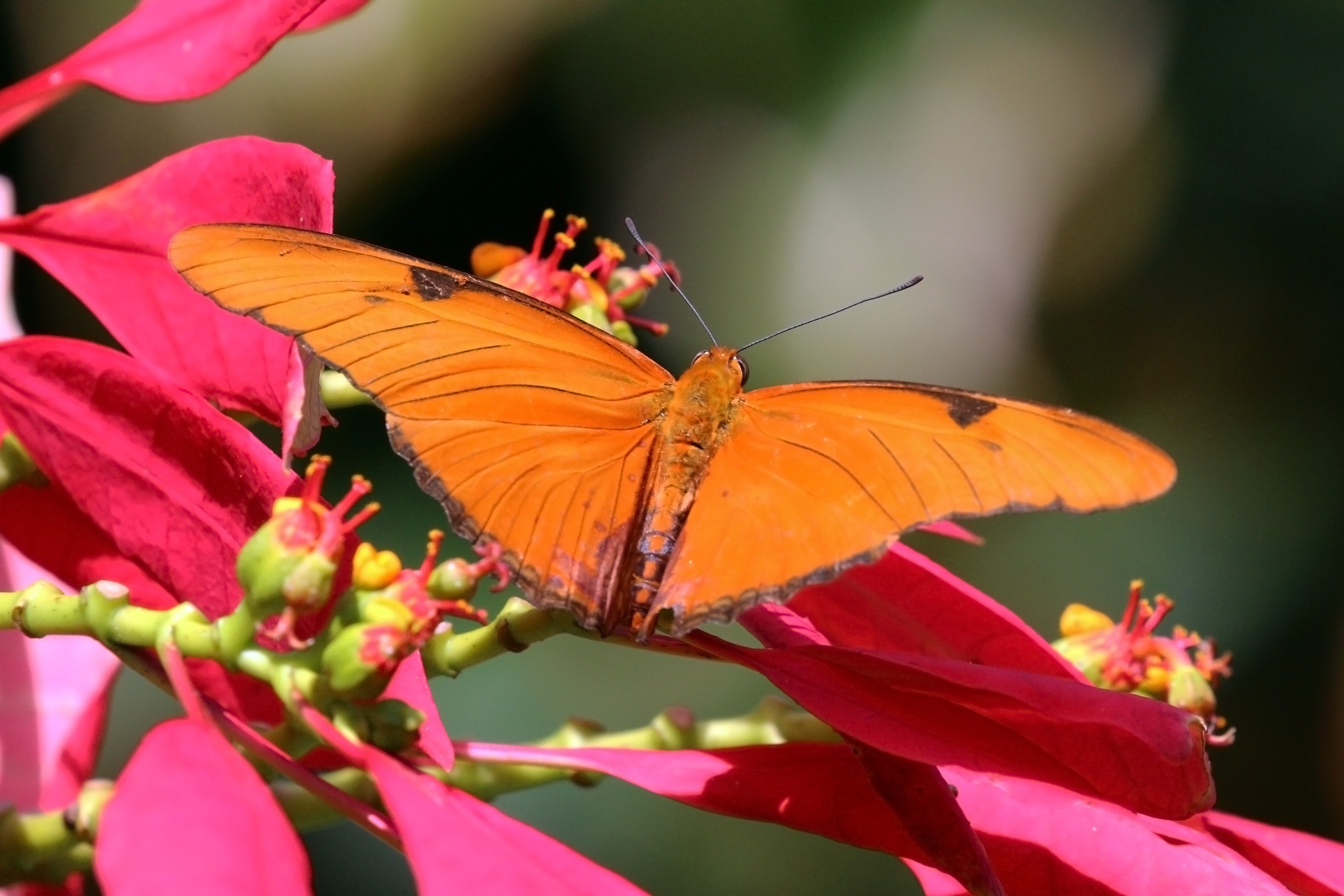
D. i. zoe
male, Grand Cayman

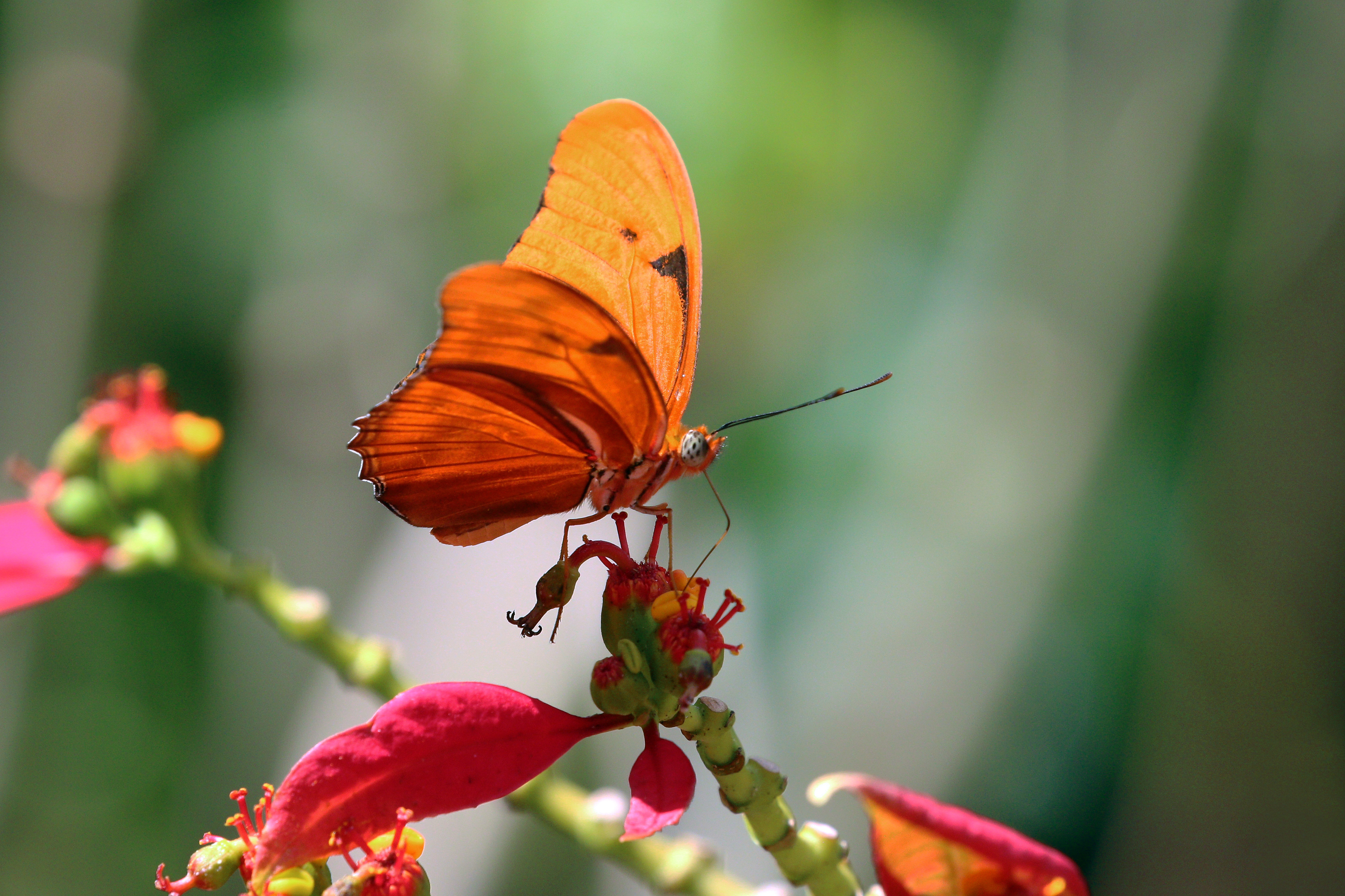
D. i. zoe
male, Grand Cayman

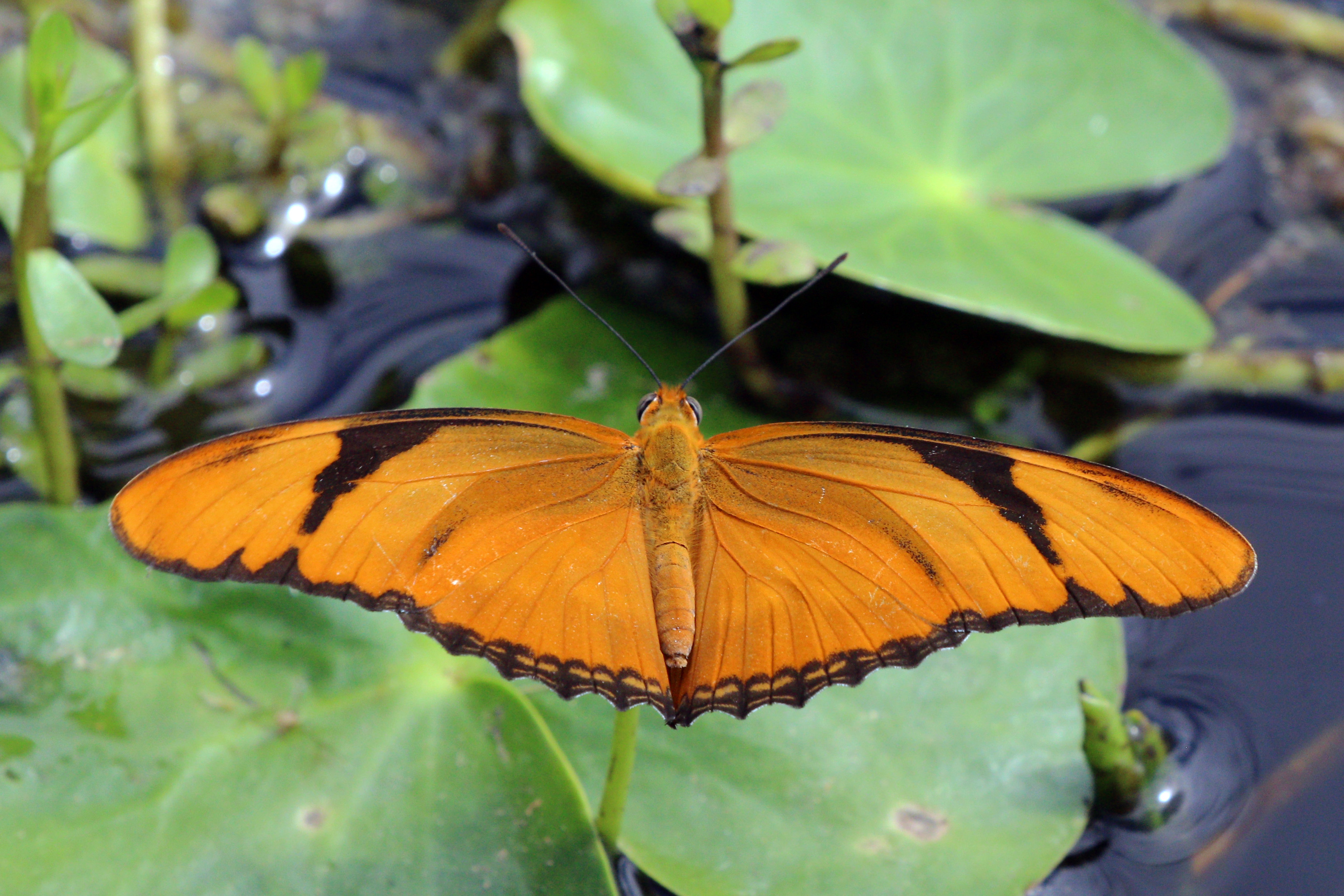
D. i. zoe
female, Grand Cayman
