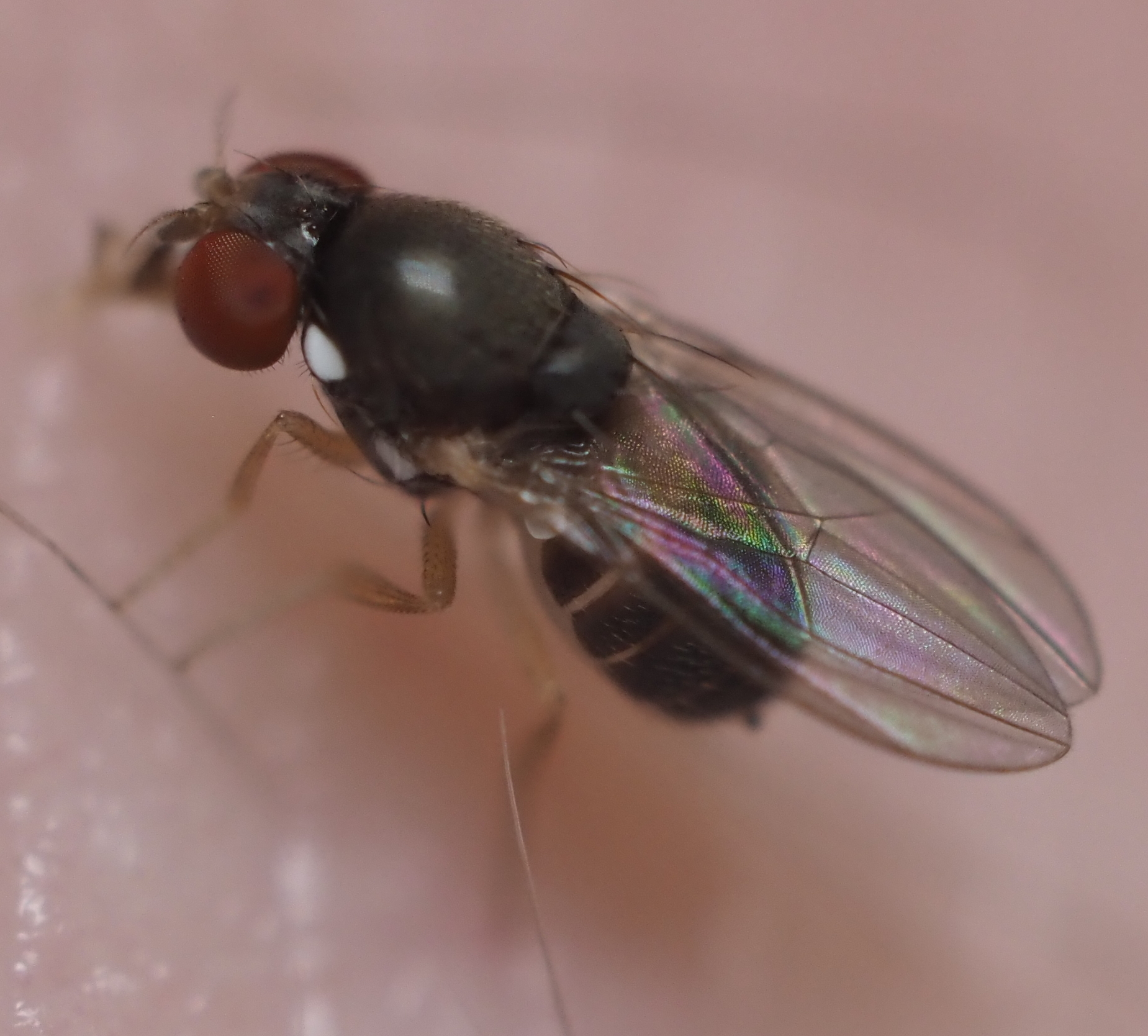
- Amiota sp.

Scientific classification
- Domain: Eukaryota
- Kingdom: Animalia
- Phylum: Arthropoda
- Class: Insecta
- Order: Diptera
- Family: Drosophilidae
- Subfamily: Steganinae
- Tribe: Gitonini
- Subtribe: Gitonina
- Genus: Amiota; Loew, 1862

Synonyms
- Amiotaa Okada, 1956; Amitoa Takada & Toda, 1973

= Amiota =

Genus of flies

Amiota is a genus of flies belonging to the family Drosophilidae. The genus has a cosmopolitan distribution.

== Species ==
- Amiota aculeata Chen & Aotsuka, 2005
- Amiota acuta Okada, 1968
- Amiota ailaoshanensis Chen & Watabe, 2005
- Amiota albidipuncta Xu & Chen, 2007
- Amiota albilabris (Roth, 1860)
- Amiota alboguttata (Wahlberg, 1839)
- Amiota albomaculata (Duda, 1926)
- Amiota allemandi Bächli, Vilela & Haring, 2002
- Amiota angulisternita Chen & Liu, 2004
- Amiota angustifolia Zhang & Chen, 2006
- Amiota apodemata Gupta & Panigrahy, 1987
- Amiota aquilotaurusata Takada, Beppu & Toda, 1979
- Amiota arcuata Chen & Watabe, 2005
- Amiota aristata Chen & Toda, 2001
- Amiota arizonensis Hsu, 1949
- Amiota asymmetrica Chen & Takamori, 2005
- Amiota atomia Máca & Lin, 1993
- Amiota bachlii Cao & Chen, 2009
- Amiota bacillia Zhang & Chen, 2006
- Amiota balaenodentata Takada, Beppu & Toda, 1979
- Amiota bandai Chassagnard & Tsacas, 1997
- Amiota barretti (Johnson, 1921)
- Amiota basdeni Assis Fonseca, 1965
- Amiota beama Wang & Chen, 2020
- Amiota biacuta Zhang & Chen, 2006
- Amiota bicolorata Bock, 1989
- Amiota bifoliacea Wang & Chen, 2020
- Amiota bifoliolata Zhang & Chen, 2006
- Amiota bifurcata Chen, 2004
- Amiota bispinula Chen & Toda, 2007
- Amiota brevifoliacea Wang & Chen, 2020
- Amiota brevipartita Chen & Gao, 2005
- Amiota brunneifemoralis Xu & Chen, 2007
- Amiota buccata Wheeler, 1952
- Amiota cerata Chen & Toda, 2007
- Amiota chenyauae Cao & Chen, 2009
- Amiota clavata Okada, 1960
- Amiota collini Beuk & Máca, 1995
- Amiota communis Chen & Steyskal, 2004
- Amiota cuii Chen & Toda, 2001
- Amiota cultella Zhang & Chen, 2006
- Amiota curvibacula Chen & Toda, 2007
- Amiota curvispina Chen & Gao, 2005
- Amiota curvistyla Okada, 1971
- Amiota cyclophylla Wang & Chen, 2020
- Amiota dehiscentia Chen & Watabe, 2005
- Amiota delta Takada, Beppu & Toda, 1979
- Amiota deltoidea Zhang & Chen, 2006
- Amiota dentata Okada, 1971
- Amiota dilatifemorata Cao & Chen, 2008
- Amiota dispina Okada, 1960
- Amiota elongata Okada, 1960
- Amiota eos Sidorenko, 1989
- Amiota falcilis Takada, Beppu & Toda, 1979
- Amiota femorata Chen & Takamori, 2005
- Amiota filipes Máca, 1980
- Amiota fissifoliolata Cao & Chen, 2008
- Amiota flagellata Okada, 1971
- Amiota flavipes Xu & Chen, 2007
- Amiota flavopruinosa Duda, 1934
- Amiota flavopruniosa Duda, 1934
- Amiota flormontana Wang & Chen, 2020
- Amiota forficula Takada, Beppu & Toda, 1979
- Amiota furcata Okada, 1960
- Amiota fuscata Chen & Zhang, 2005
- Amiota gaoi Zhang & Chen, 2006
- Amiota geisson Wang & Chen, 2020
- Amiota gigantomelania Wang & Chen, 2020
- Amiota gracilenta Zhang & Chen, 2006
- Amiota hernowoi Chen & Toda, 1998
- Amiota hsui Máca, 2003
- Amiota huae Chen & Gao, 2005
- Amiota humeralis Loew, 1862
- Amiota javaensis Chen & Toda, 1998
- Amiota jianjuni Wang & Chen, 2020
- Amiota jizushanensis Chen & Watabe, 2005
- Amiota kamui Chen & Toda, 2001
- Amiota kimurai Chen & Toda, 2001
- Amiota kingstoni Hsu, 1949
- Amiota kitamurai Chen & Liu, 2004
- Amiota lacteoguttata (Portschinsky, 1891)
- Amiota lambirensis Chen & Toda, 2007
- Amiota lanceolata Okada, 1971
- Amiota latitabula Chen & Watabe, 2005
- Amiota leucostoma Loew, 1862
- Amiota lineiventris Máca, 2003
- Amiota lipingae Chen & Gao, 2005
- Amiota longispinata Chen & Gao, 2005
- Amiota luguhuensis Chen & Watabe, 2005
- Amiota macai Chen & Toda, 2001
- Amiota magniflava Chen & Toda, 2001
- Amiota mariae Máca, 2003
- Amiota medidehiscentia Wang & Chen, 2020
- Amiota melanoleuca Tsacas, 1990
- Amiota minor (Malloch, 1921)
- Amiota montuosa Zhang & Chen, 2008
- Amiota multiprocessa Wang & Chen, 2020
- Amiota multispinata Zhang & Chen, 2006
- Amiota nagatai Okada, 1960
- Amiota nebojsa Máca, 2003
- Amiota nigrescens Wheeler, 1952
- Amiota nigripes Wang & Chen, 2020
- Amiota nozawai Chen & Watabe, 2005
- Amiota nuerhachii Chen & Toda, 2001
- Amiota nulliseta Wang & Chen, 2020
- Amiota obtusa Wang & Chen, 2020
- Amiota okinawana Okada, 1971
- Amiota onchopyga Nishiharu, 1979
- Amiota orchidea Okada, 1968
- Amiota palpifera Okada, 1971
- Amiota paraspinata Chen & Watabe, 2005
- Amiota parvipyga Chen & Toda, 1998
- Amiota parviserrata Chen & Toda, 2007
- Amiota pengi Chen & Toda, 1998
- Amiota perpusilla (Walker, 1849)
- Amiota phyllochaeta Tsacas & Okada, 1983
- Amiota pianmensis Zhang & Chen, 2006
- Amiota planata Chen & Toda, 2001
- Amiota planiceps Wang & Chen, 2020
- Amiota policladia Wang & Chen, 2020
- Amiota pontianakensis Chen & Toda, 1998
- Amiota promissa Okada, 1960
- Amiota protuberantis Cao & Chen, 2009:
- Amiota quadrifoliolata Chen & Toda, 2007
- Amiota ratnae Chen & Toda, 1998
- Amiota rufescens (Oldenberg, 1914)
- Amiota sacculipes Máca & Lin, 1993
- Amiota scrobiculus Wang & Chen, 2020
- Amiota semiannuiata Wang & Chen, 2020
- Amiota setigera Malloch, 1924
- Amiota setitibia Xu & Chen, 2007
- Amiota setosa Zhang & Chen, 2006
- Amiota shangrila Chen & Watabe, 2005
- Amiota sigma Okada, 1971
- Amiota sinuata Okada, 1968
- Amiota spinata Chen & Toda, 2001
- Amiota spinifemorata Li & Chen, 2008
- Amiota steganoptera Malloch, 1926
- Amiota steyskali Máca, 2003
- Amiota stylopyga Wakahama & Okada, 1958
- Amiota subfurcata Okada, 1971
- Amiota subsinuata Chen & Aotsuka, 2005
- Amiota subtursradiata Duda, 1934
- Amiota subtusradiata Duda, 1934
- Amiota taurusata Takada, Beppu & Toda, 1979
- Amiota tentacula Wang & Chen, 2020
- Amiota todai Sidorenko, 1989
- Amiota trifurcata Okada, 1968
- Amiota uncinata Wang & Chen, 2020
- Amiota vulnerabla Chen & Zhang, 2004
- Amiota wangi Chen & Zhang, 2005
- Amiota watabei Chen & Toda, 2001
- Amiota wuyishanensis Chen & Zhang, 2005
- Amiota xinglaii Wang & Chen, 2020
- Amiota xishuangbanna Chen & Aotsuka, 2005
- Amiota yangonensis Chen & Toda, 1998
- Amiota yifengi Zhang & Chen, 2006
- Amiota yixiangna Chen & Takamori, 2005
