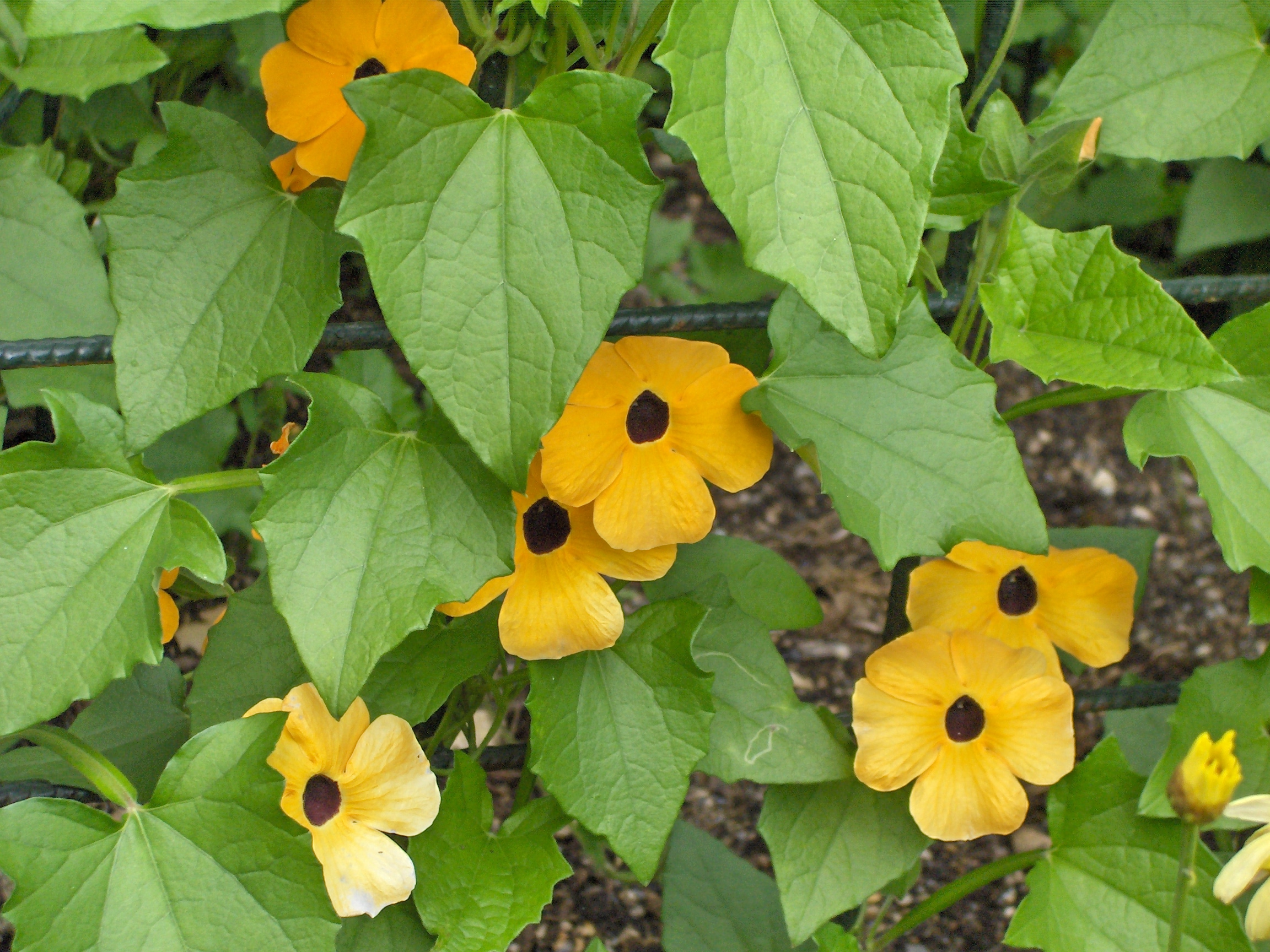
- Flowers of Thunbergia alata

Scientific classification
- Kingdom: Plantae
- Clade: Embryophytes
- Clade: Tracheophytes
- Clade: Spermatophytes
- Clade: Angiosperms
- Clade: Eudicots
- Clade: Asterids
- Order: Lamiales
- Family: Acanthaceae
- Subfamily: Thunbergioideae
- Genus: Thunbergia; Retz. (1780)

Diversity
- c. 150 species

Synonyms
- Diplocalymma Spreng. (1822); Endomelas Raf. (1838); Flemingia Roxb. ex Rottler (1803), nom. rej.; Hexacentris Nees (1832); Pleimeris Raf. (1838); Pleuremidis Raf. (1838); Schmidia Wight (1852); Valentiana Raf. (1814)

= Thunbergia =

Genus of flowering plants

Thunbergia is a genus of flowering plants in the family Acanthaceae. It includes 150 species native to tropical and subtropical regions of sub-Saharan Africa, Madagascar, southern Asia, New Guinea, and Australia. Thunbergia species are vigorous annual or perennial vines and shrubs growing to 2–8 m tall. The generic name honours the Swedish naturalist Carl Peter Thunberg (1743-1828).

Its members are known by various names, including thunbergias and clockvine. Thunbergia on its own usually refers to Thunbergia grandiflora, while Thunbergia alata is often known as black-eyed Susan vine or just black-eyed Susan (not to be confused with other flowers called black-eyed Susan). Orange clockvine is the name of Thunbergia gregorii.

Thunbergias are frequent garden escapes, becoming invasive species; T. grandiflora, T. fragrans, and T. laurifolia are considered weeds in Australia.

== Selected species ==
Species include:

- Thunbergia alata Bojer ex Sims
- Thunbergia annua Hochst. ex Nees
- Thunbergia atriplicifolia E.Mey. ex Nees
- Thunbergia battiscombei Turrill
- Thunbergia bicolor (Wight) Lindau
- Thunbergia coccinea Wall. ex D.Don
- Thunbergia erecta (Benth.) T. Anderson
- Thunbergia fragrans Roxb.
- Thunbergia grandiflora Roxb.
- Thunbergia gregorii S.Moore
- Thunbergia laurifolia Lindl.
- Thunbergia mildbraediana Lebrun & L.Touss.
- Thunbergia mysorensis (Wight) T.Anderson
- Thunbergia natalensis Hook.

=== Formerly placed here ===
- Meyenia hawtayneana (Wall.) Nees (as T. hawtayneana Wall.)

== Gallery ==
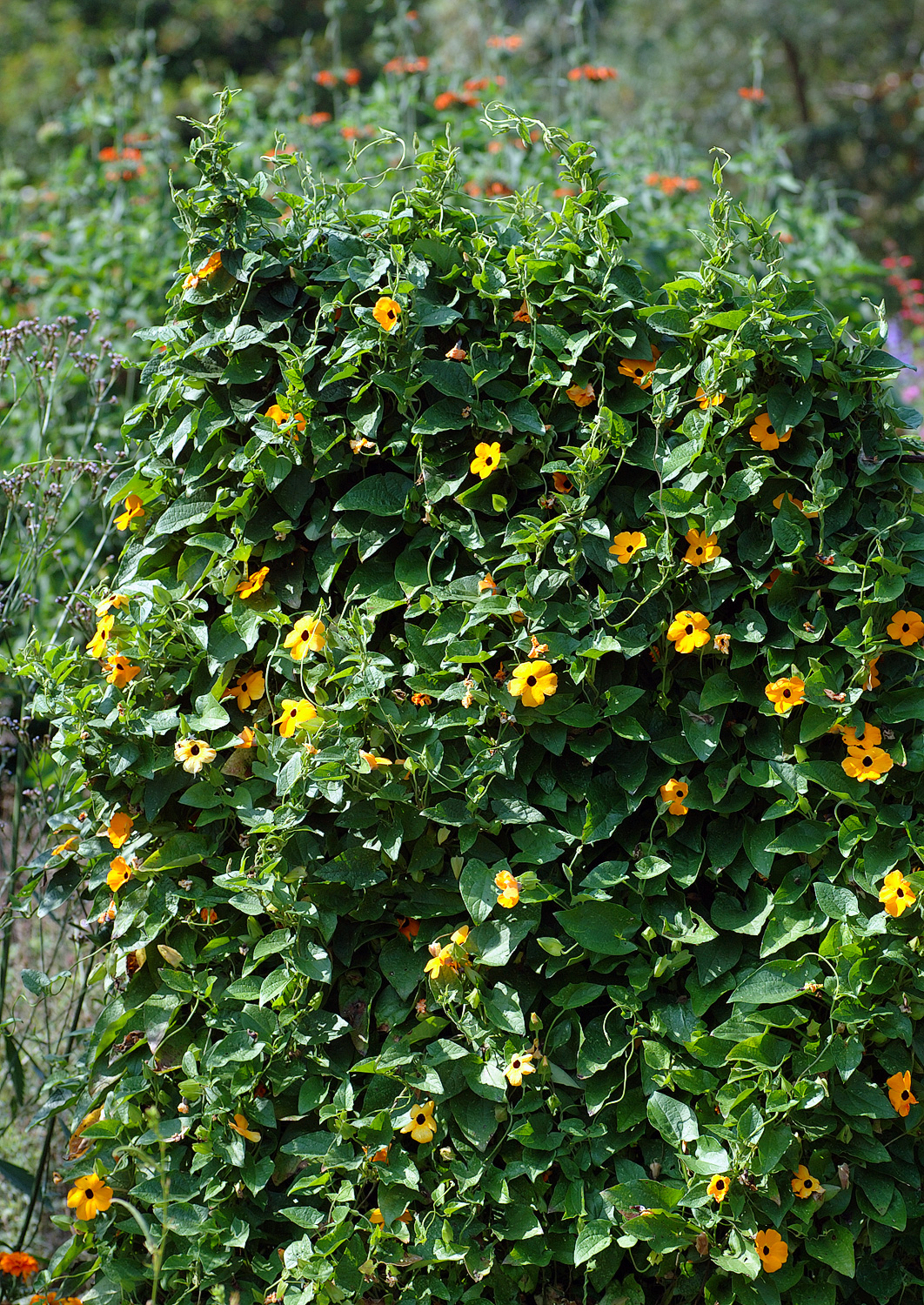
Thunbergia alata

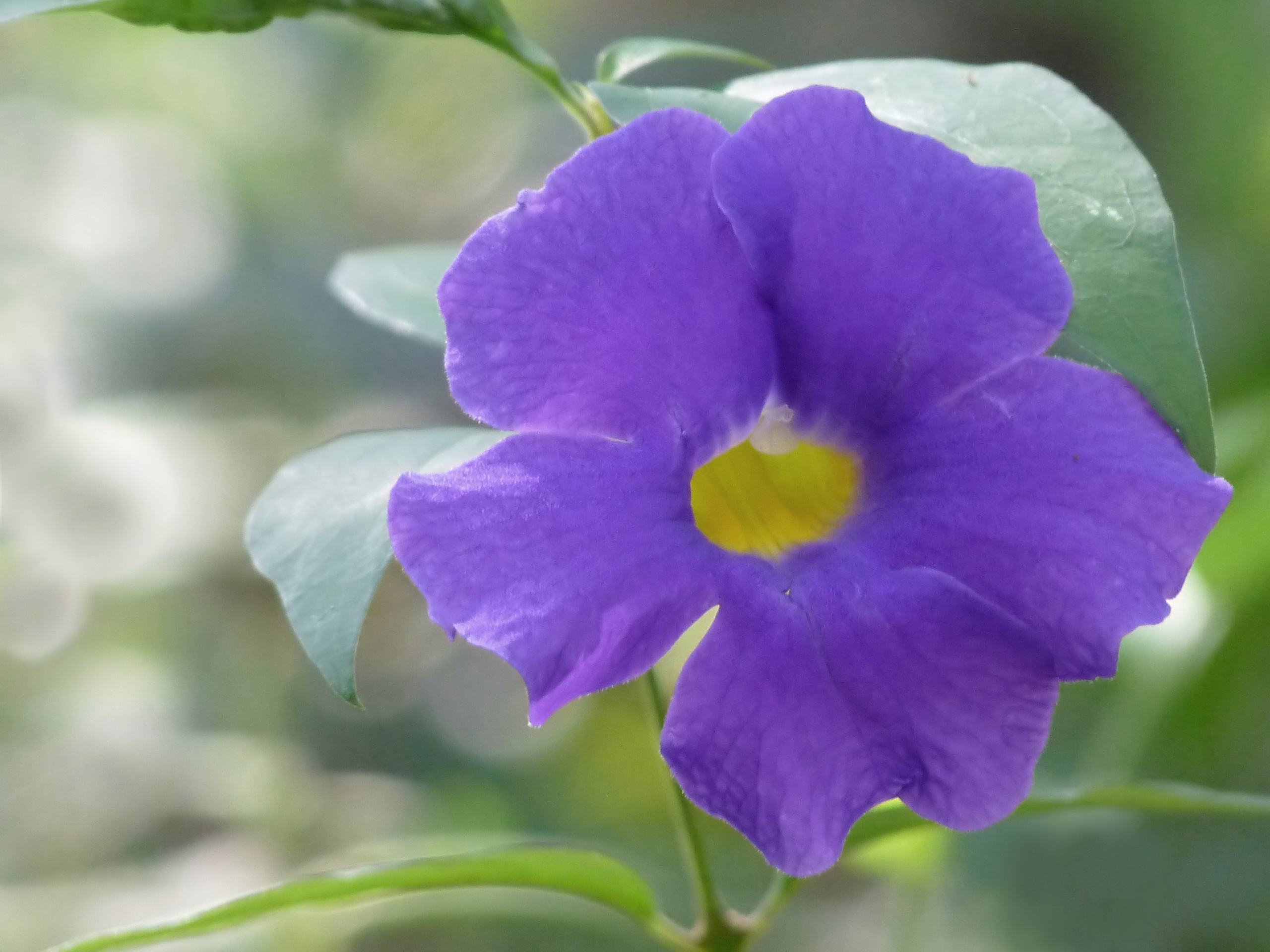
Thunbergia erecta

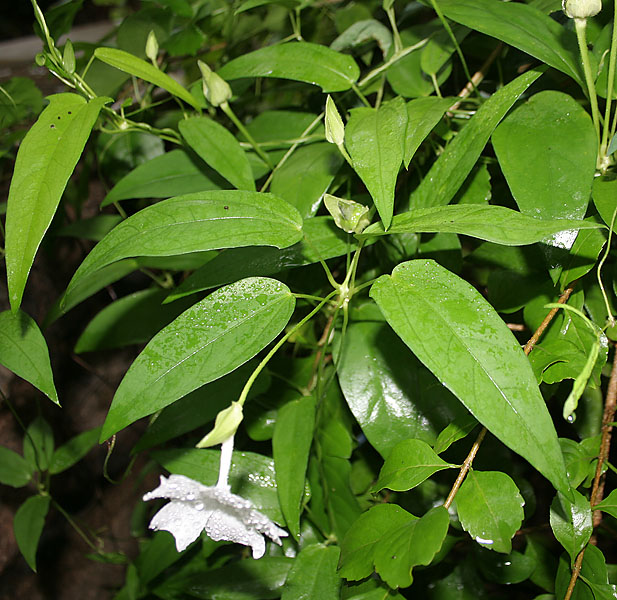
Thunbergia fragrans

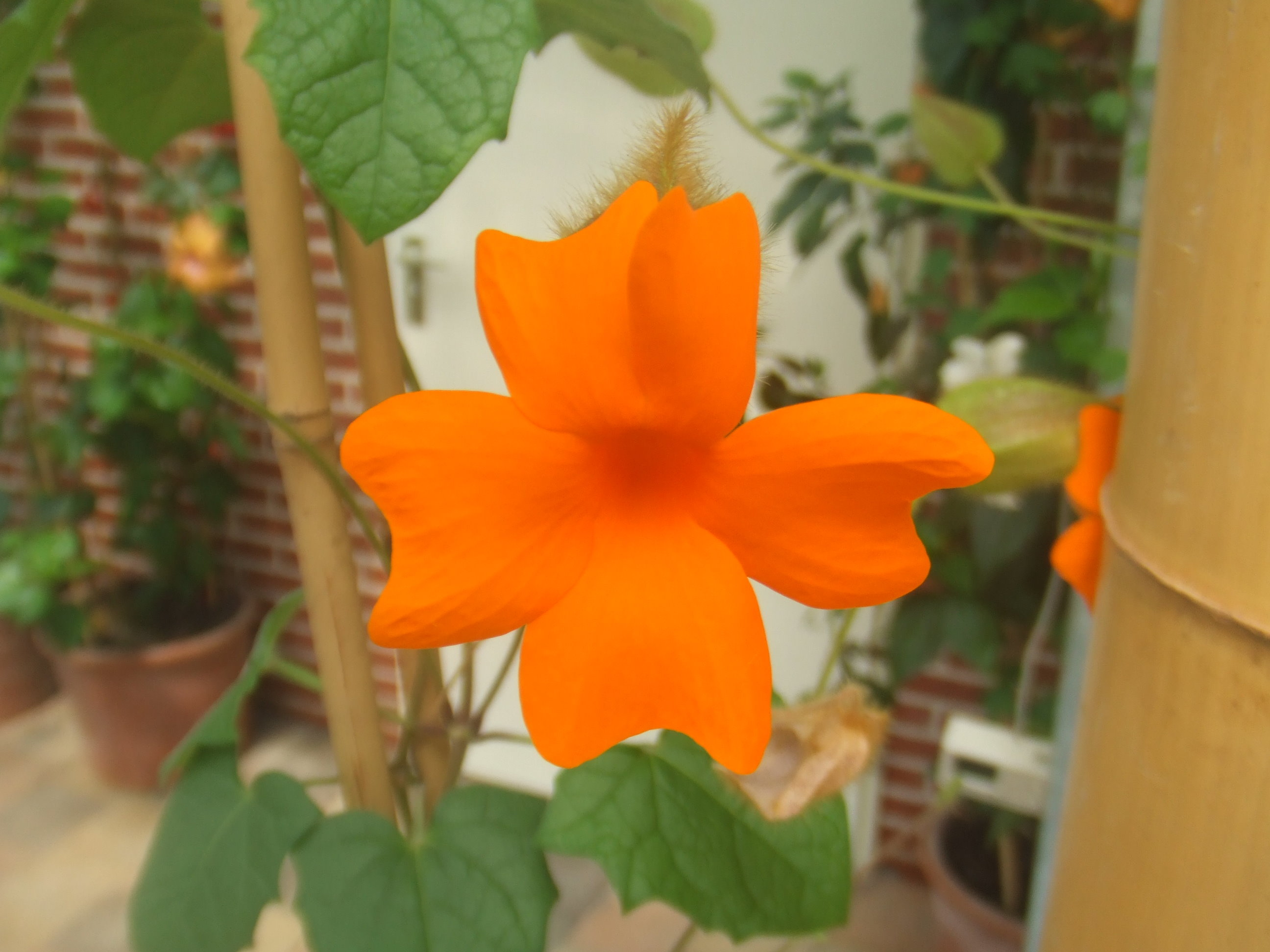
Thunbergia gregorii

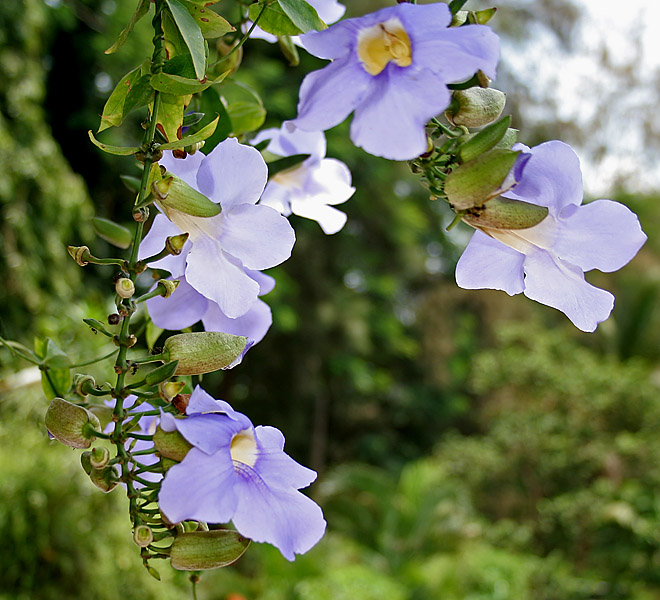
Thunbergia laurifolia

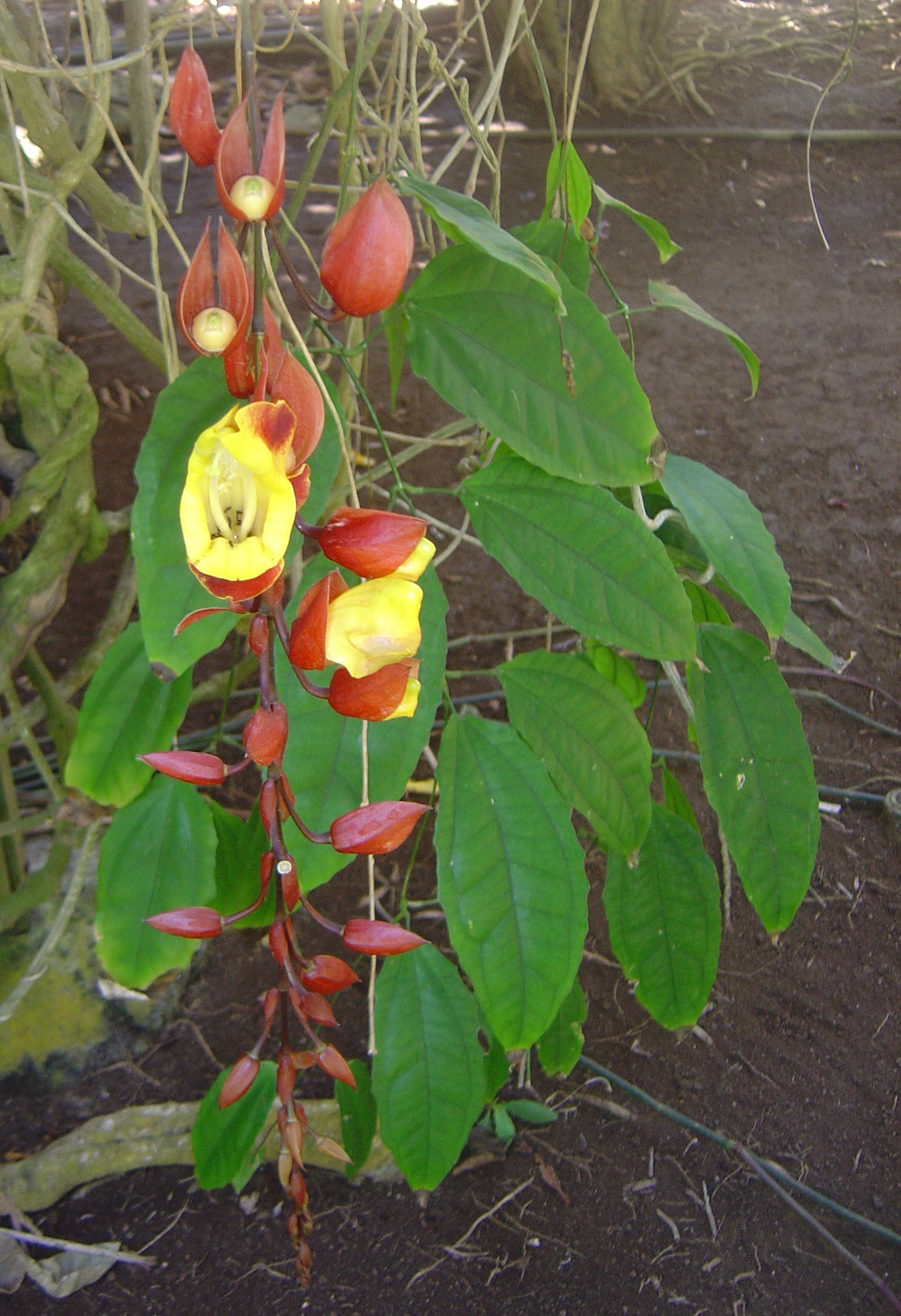
Thunbergia mysorensis
