= Meyenia (disambiguation) =

Meyenia may mean:

- Meyenia, a monotypic genus of flowering plants in the family Acanthaceae
- Meyenia, a genus of sponges in the family Spongillidae; synonym of Ephydatia
