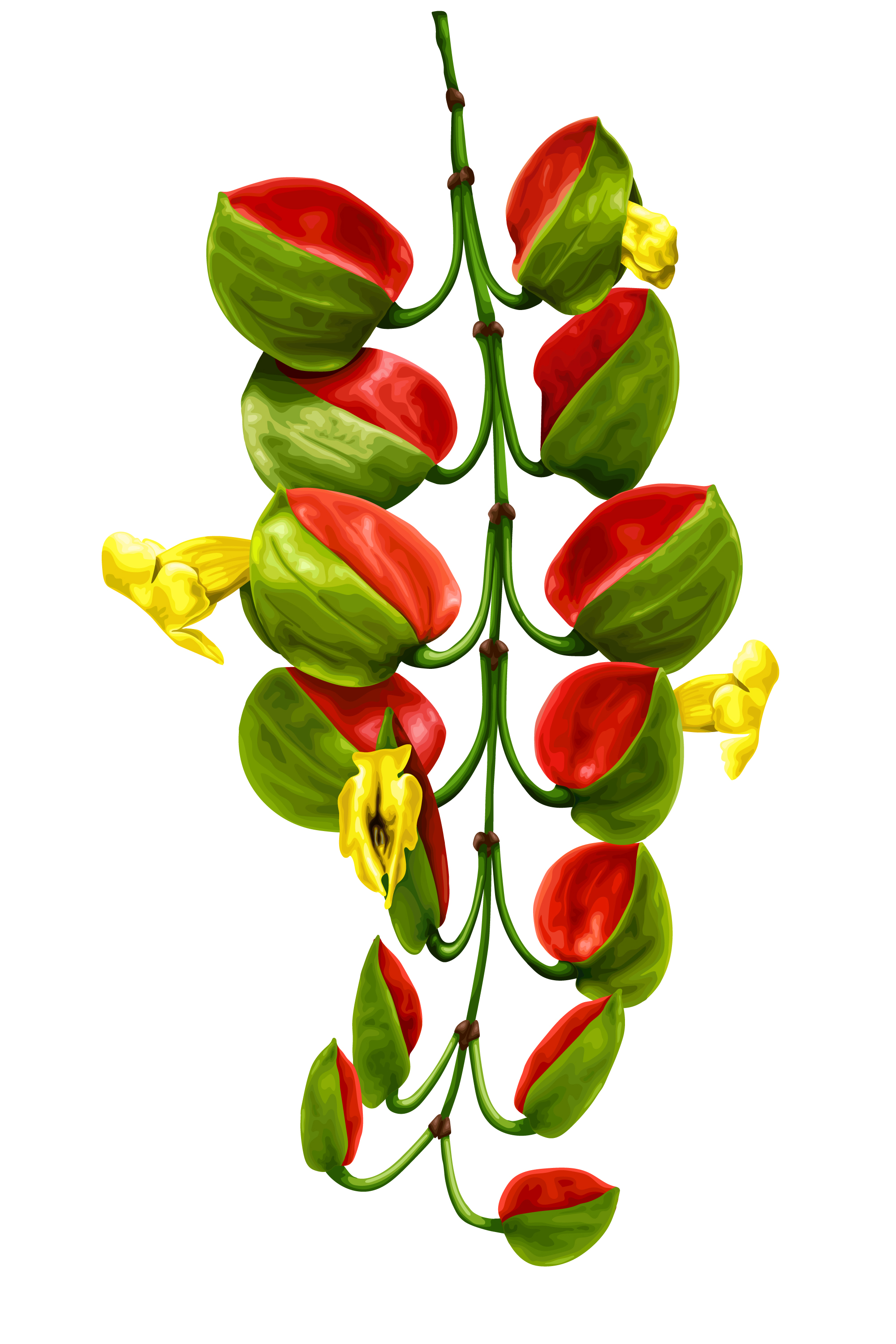

Scientific classification
- Kingdom: Plantae
- Clade: Tracheophytes
- Clade: Angiosperms
- Clade: Eudicots
- Clade: Asterids
- Order: Lamiales
- Family: Acanthaceae
- Genus: Thunbergia
- Species: T. bicolor

Binomial name
- Thunbergia bicolor (Wight) Lindau

Synonyms
- Schmidia bicolor Wight; Thunbergia wightiana T.Anderson

= Thunbergia bicolor =

Species of flowering plant

Thunbergia bicolor, also known as the bicolor clockvine, is a species of flowering plant within the family Acanthaceae.

== Description ==
=== Leaves ===
The leaves of Thunbergia bicolor are paired at a node and borne opposite to each other. They are oval to triangular in shape, with a pointed tip and a base that can be either truncate or rounded. The leaves are palmately veined and the veins radiate out from a central point like the fingers of a hand. The leaf margins are crenate, exhibiting shallow rounded teeth along the edges.

=== Flowers ===
The flowers of Thunbergia bicolor are borne in hanging clusters known as axillary pendent racemes. These clusters are positioned in the leaf axils, where the leaf meets the stem. The flowers are accompanied by conspicuous bracts that are roughly 2-2.5 cm in diameter. These bracts have a cordate-orbicular shape, with the upper half displaying an orange-red coloration while the lower half is light green.

The calyx, which forms the outermost part of the flower, is either an entire (smooth) ring or slightly crenulate (with slight scalloping). The corolla, the inner part of the flower, is bluish and eye-catching. It consists of a cylindrical or bulging tube that curves, while the corolla limb is oblique in shape. There are five lobes in the corolla, which are twisted to the left while in the bud stage.

Stamens, the male reproductive parts of the flower, are present in sets of four and are didynamous, meaning they occur in two pairs of different lengths. These stamens are inserted near the base of the corolla tube. Each stamen has anthers that are glabrous and divided into two cells, with each cell featuring a long spur. The ovary of the flower is two-celled, and each cell contains two ovules.

=== Fruit and Seeds ===
After successful pollination and fertilization, the flower develops into a capsule as the fruit. The capsule has a globose shape at the lower part and abruptly narrows into a beak resembling a sword. The beak is devoid of seeds. Within each cell of the capsule, there are two seeds, and these seeds are globose in shape. Flowering and fruiting occurs between the months of November and January.

== Distribution and habitat ==
Thunbergia bicolor is endemic to Southwest India, where it can be found growing in South Western Ghats montane rain forests. This species has been found to inhabit the evergreen forests of both Kerala and Tamil Nadu.
