= Thunbergia annua =

Scientific classification
- Kingdom: Plantae
- Clade: Tracheophytes
- Clade: Angiosperms
- Clade: Eudicots
- Clade: Asterids
- Order: Lamiales
- Family: Acanthaceae
- Genus: Thunbergia
- Species: T. annua

Binomial name
- Thunbergia annua Hochst.

Synonyms
- Thunbergia ruspolii Lindau

Species of flowering plant

Thunbergia annua, the annual thunbergia, is a herbaceous upright plant, in the genus Thunbergia, and is native to multiple countries within Africa. Although it has never been found there, it is a considered a potentially invasive weed in Queensland, Australia.

== Description ==
Unlike most species within the genus Thunbergia, Thunbergia annua is not a climbing vine. It is an erect or decumbent annual plant, with stems reaching up to 25 cm in length. Its leaves are opposite, oblong-ovate, 4-6 cm long, and sparsely silvery hairy, particularly along the veins. The leaf margins feature a pair of large teeth in the lower third, occasionally becoming coarsely toothed towards the apex. The petiole is very short, measuring 0-2 mm long, and while not winged, the leaf base is somewhat decurrent. The flowers are solitary and axillary, borne on pedicels 3-6 mm long (up to 9 mm in fruit). The calyx is finely velvety, with scattered capitate glands. The corolla is white, with or without a pale yellow centre; its tube is cylindrical for about 2 mm, widening into a throat 7-10 mm long and 3-5 mm wide at the apex. The lobes of the corolla are 3-5 mm long, and the anthers are approximately 1.5 mm long, bearded at the base. The capsule is depressed globose, 6-10 mm in diameter, with an 8-12 mm long beak and a densely velvety surface.

== Distribution and habitat ==
Thunbergia annua can be found within many countries across Africa such as: Botswana, Ethiopia, Kenya, Niger, Sudan, Tanzania, Uganda and Zimbabwe. The species inhabits seasonally dry grassland habitats where it can be found growing within clay soils. Thunbergia annua is also known to grow on arable land as a weed within cotton fields. It has been recorded at elevations of 1100 meters above sea level.
