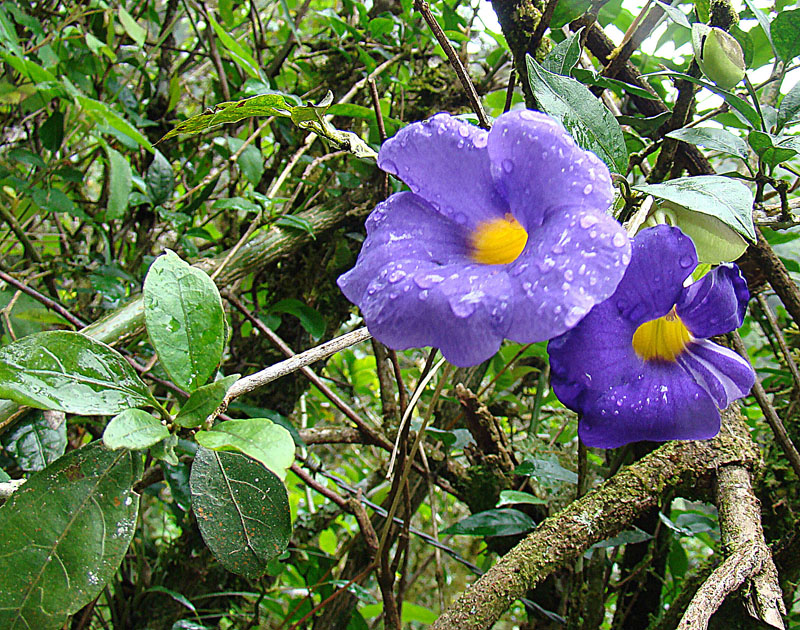

Scientific classification
- Kingdom: Plantae
- Clade: Tracheophytes
- Clade: Angiosperms
- Clade: Eudicots
- Clade: Asterids
- Order: Lamiales
- Family: Acanthaceae
- Genus: Thunbergia
- Species: T. battiscombei

Binomial name
- Thunbergia battiscombei Turrill
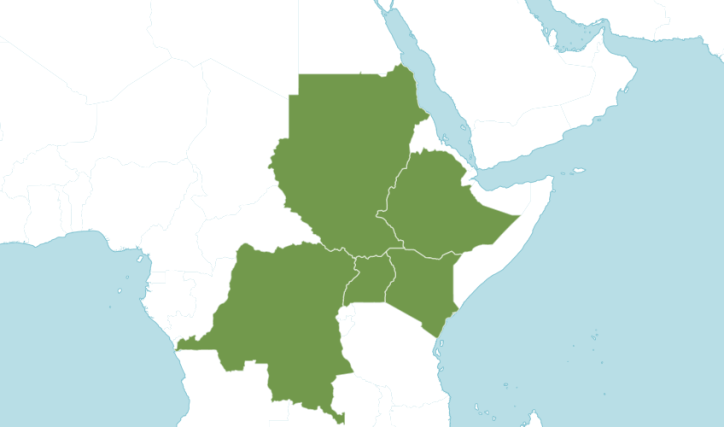

Synonyms
- Thunbergia adjumaensis De Wild.

= Thunbergia battiscombei =

Species of flowering plant

Thunbergia battiscombei, also known as the blue glory vine, is a species of flowering plant within the family Acanthaceae. It is sometimes used as an ornamental garden plant for its beautiful large blooms and leafy foliage. Thunbergia battiscombei is also cultivated as a herb within its native range. Some people superstitiously believe the herb is able to help remedy mental imbalance, curses and black magic.

== Description ==
Thunbergia battiscombei is a perennial species. Its leaves are wide and ovate, which can grow up to 17 cm long. Flowers of this species are purple with the centre of the flower possessing a bright yellow throat. The flowers are trumpet shaped. It grows in a variety of habitats and as a result has adapted different growth habits ranging from erect, climbing and creeping.

== Distribution and habitat ==
Thunbergia battiscombei is endemic to tropical Africa where it is native to the countries of: Ethiopia, Kenya, Sudan, Uganda and the Democratic Republic of the Congo.

Thunbergia battiscombei can be found within a wide range of habitats including: woodlands, grasslands, riversides and hillsides. This species especially favours Combretum Woodlands and grassland habitats that are prone to annual fires. It can be found growing at altitudes up to 300 meters above sea level.

== Cultivation ==
Within captivity Thunbergia battiscombei can be propagated via the method of stem cuttings. Seeds can also be harvested and used to grow new plants, however this is not always possible due to the fact the flowers require specific pollinators to reproduce. Sprawling stems can also form new clumps when contact with soil is made. These clumps can then be divided in order to propagate more plants.

== Gallery ==
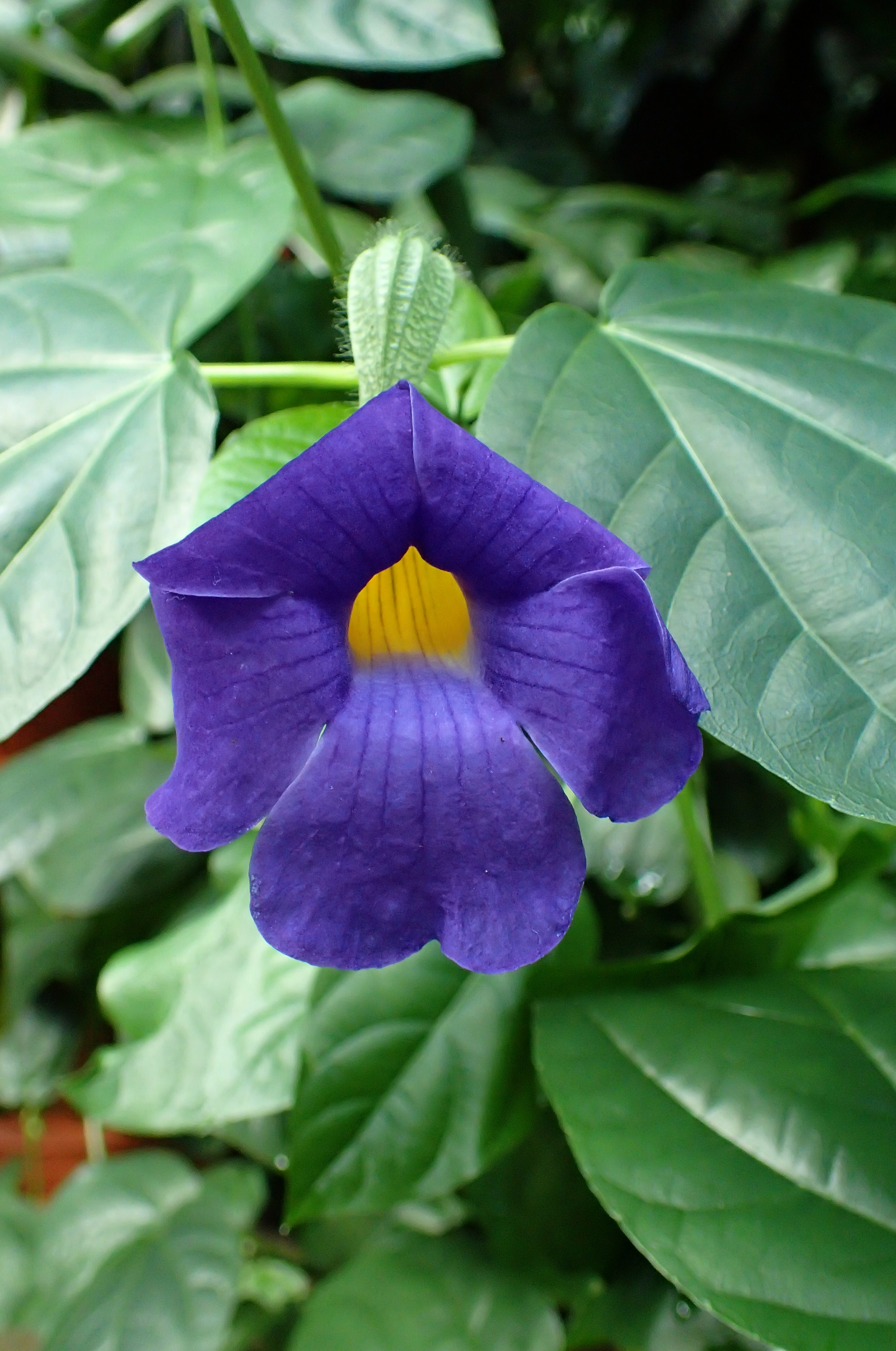
Front view of the flower.

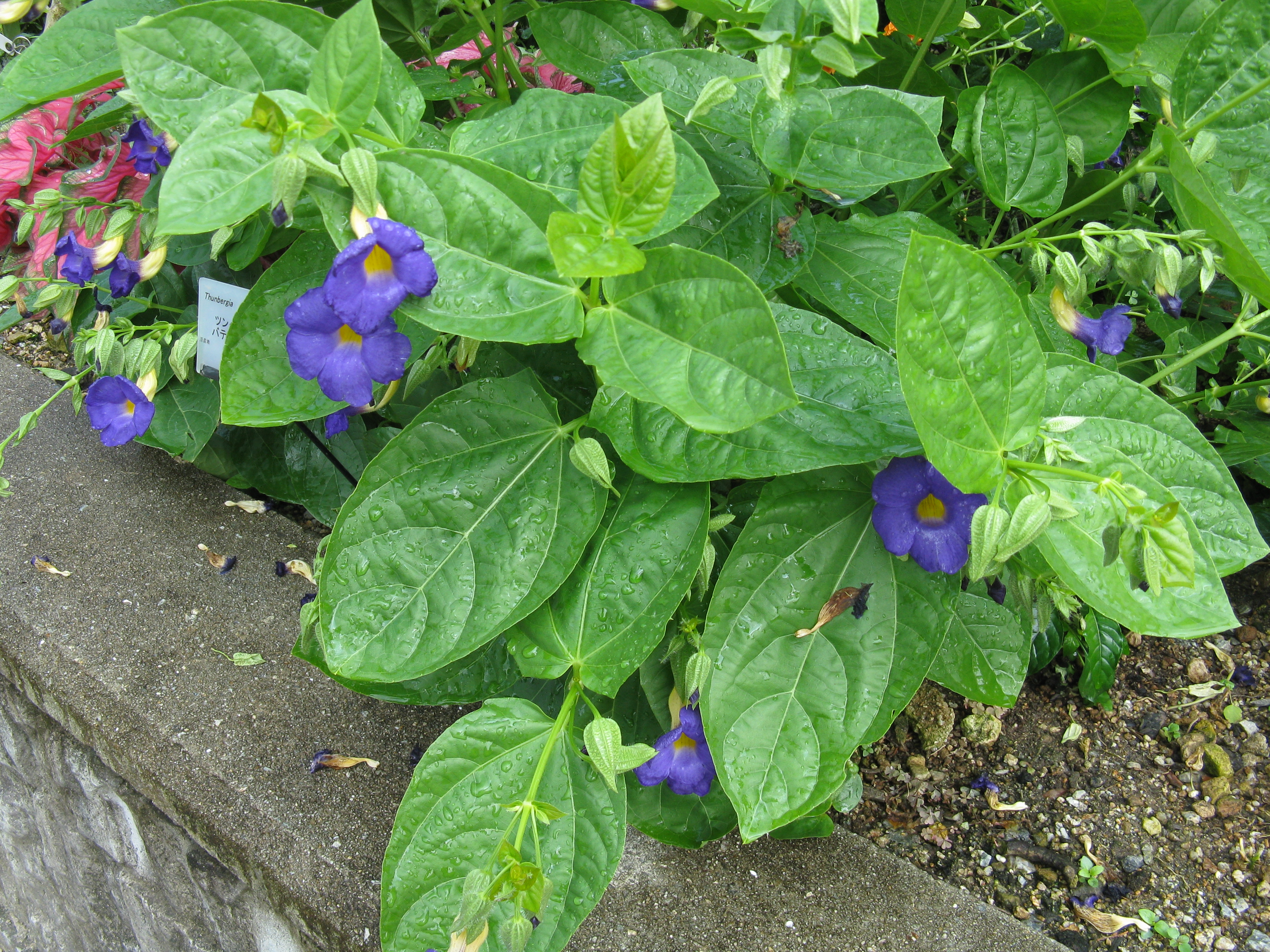
Growing in a garden border.

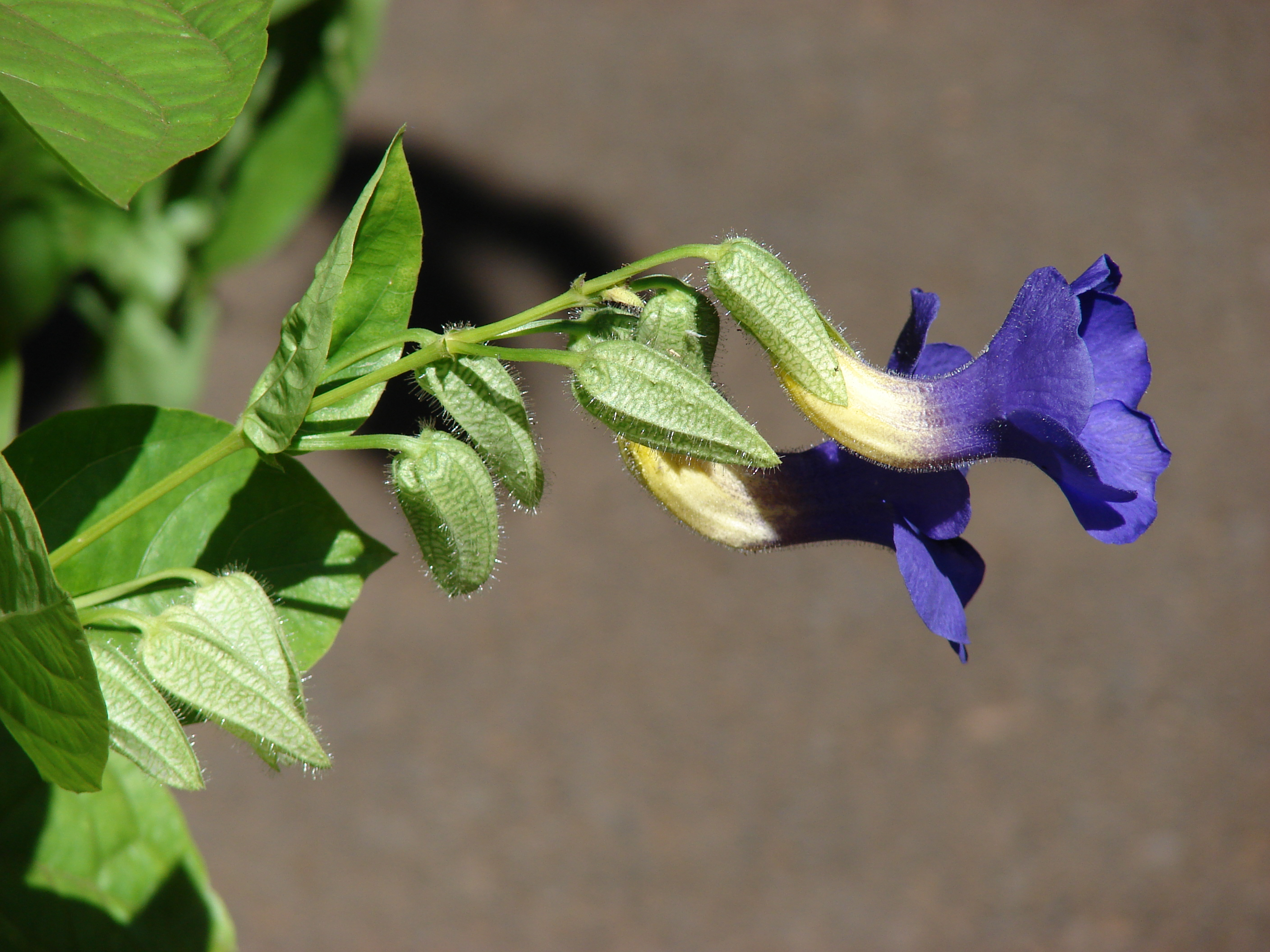
Flower side view.

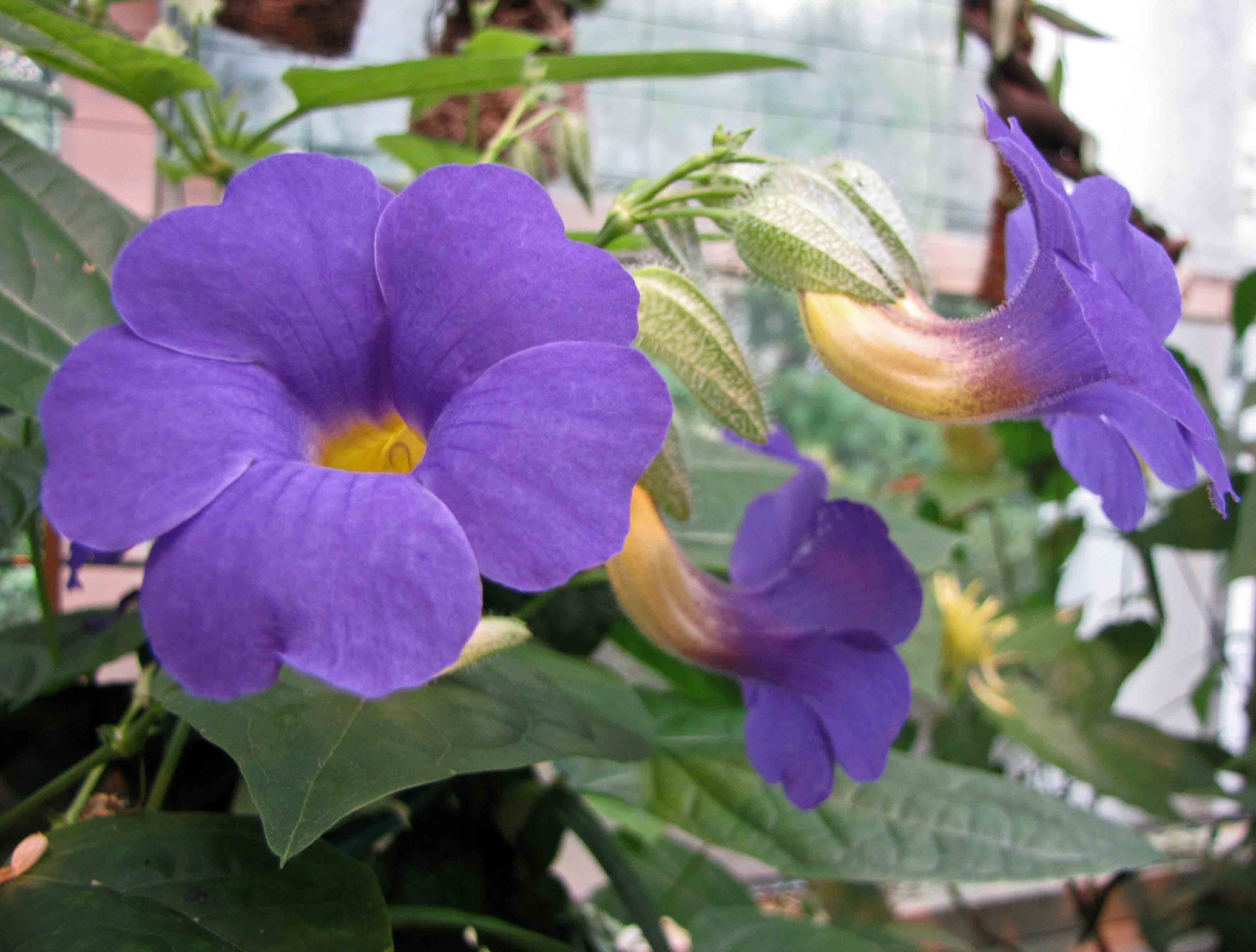
A group of flowers.

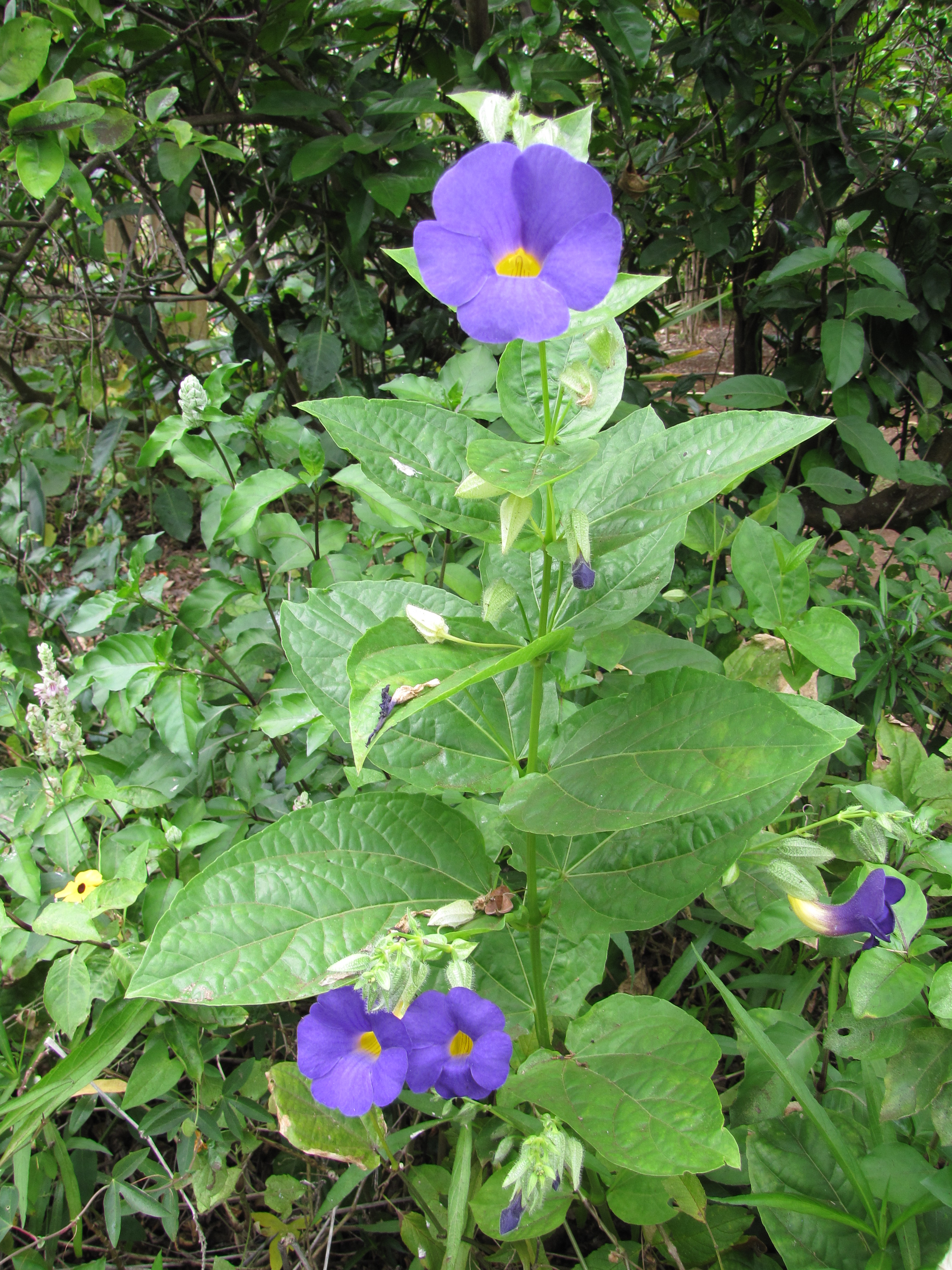
Erect growth habit.

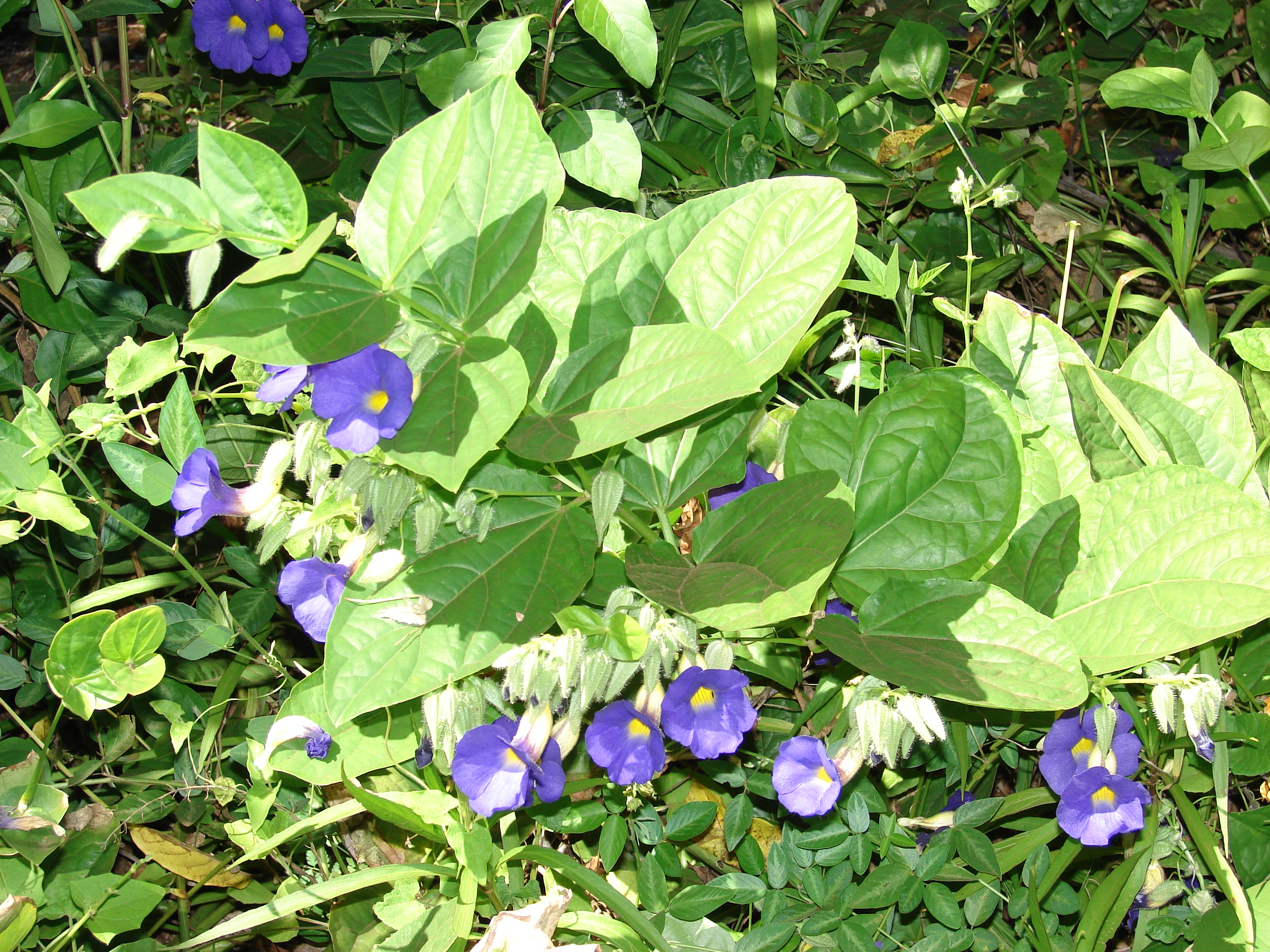
Variegated leaf form.
