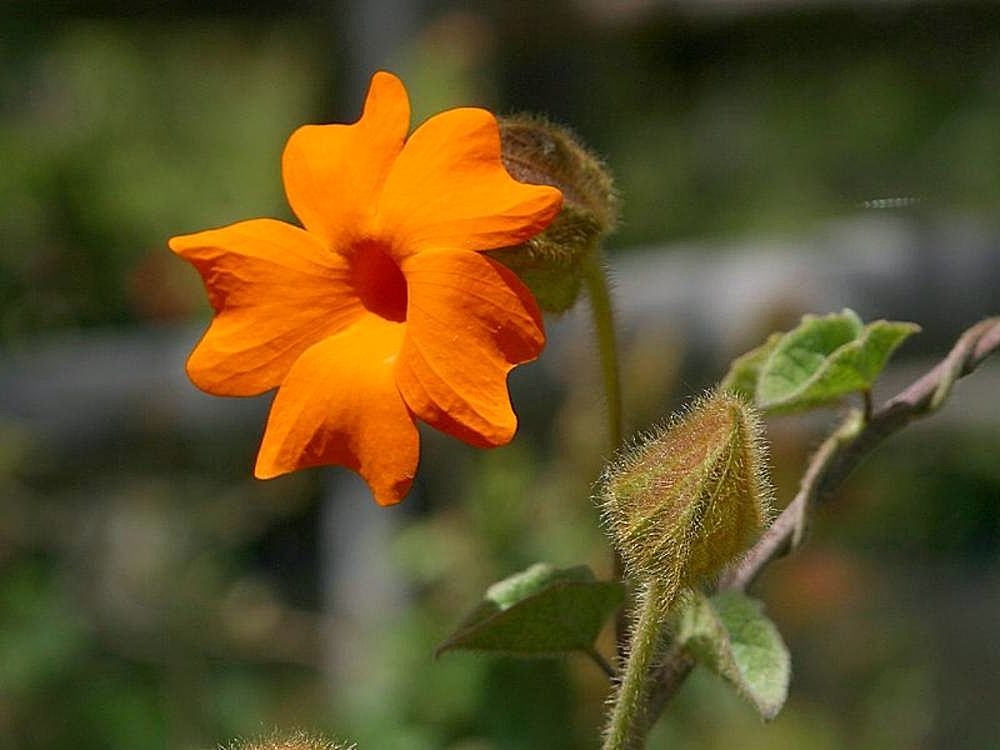

Scientific classification
- Kingdom: Plantae
- Clade: Tracheophytes
- Clade: Angiosperms
- Clade: Eudicots
- Clade: Asterids
- Order: Lamiales
- Family: Acanthaceae
- Genus: Thunbergia
- Species: T. gregorii

Binomial name
- Thunbergia gregorii S.Moore, 1894

= Thunbergia gregorii =

Species of flowering plant

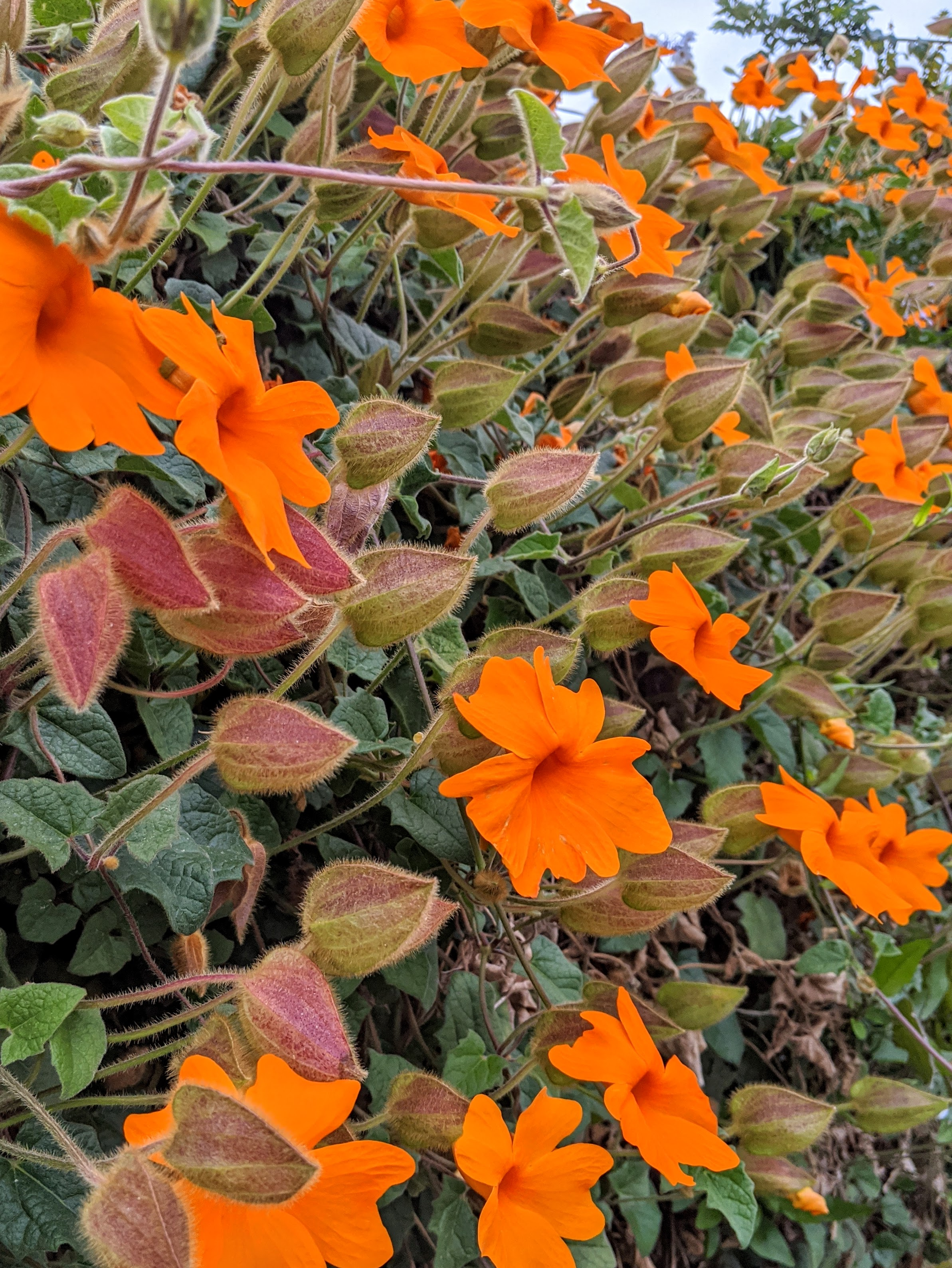
Orange clockvine, flowering in May, in Mountain View, California

Thunbergia gregorii, commonly known as orange clockvine or orange trumpet vine, is a herbaceous perennial climbing plant species in the family Acanthaceae, native to East Africa and sometimes cultivated as an ornamental vine. The bright, pure all-orange flowers distinguish it from the related black-eyed Susan vine (Thunbergia alata).

Spencer Le Marchant Moore described the species in 1894, naming it after John Walter Gregory. Within the genus Thunbergia, it is most closely related to T. alata, the two being placed in the subgenus Parahexacentris. The common name of clockvine relates to the vine spiralling upwards in a clockwise direction.

Thunbergia gregorii is an evergreen vine that grows to 8–10 ft. tall, or if left without support can become an extensive groundcover. It looks like the related black-eyed Susan vine (T. alata), but without the black eye.

Thunbergia gregorii is native to east Africa, and is pollinated by bees.

Hardy to -1 C, Thunbergia gregorii flowers more profusely and even year-round in warmer climates, while restricted to summer and autumn in cooler climates. It has received the Royal Horticultural Society's Award of Garden Merit.

Propagation is by cuttings taken in the summer.
