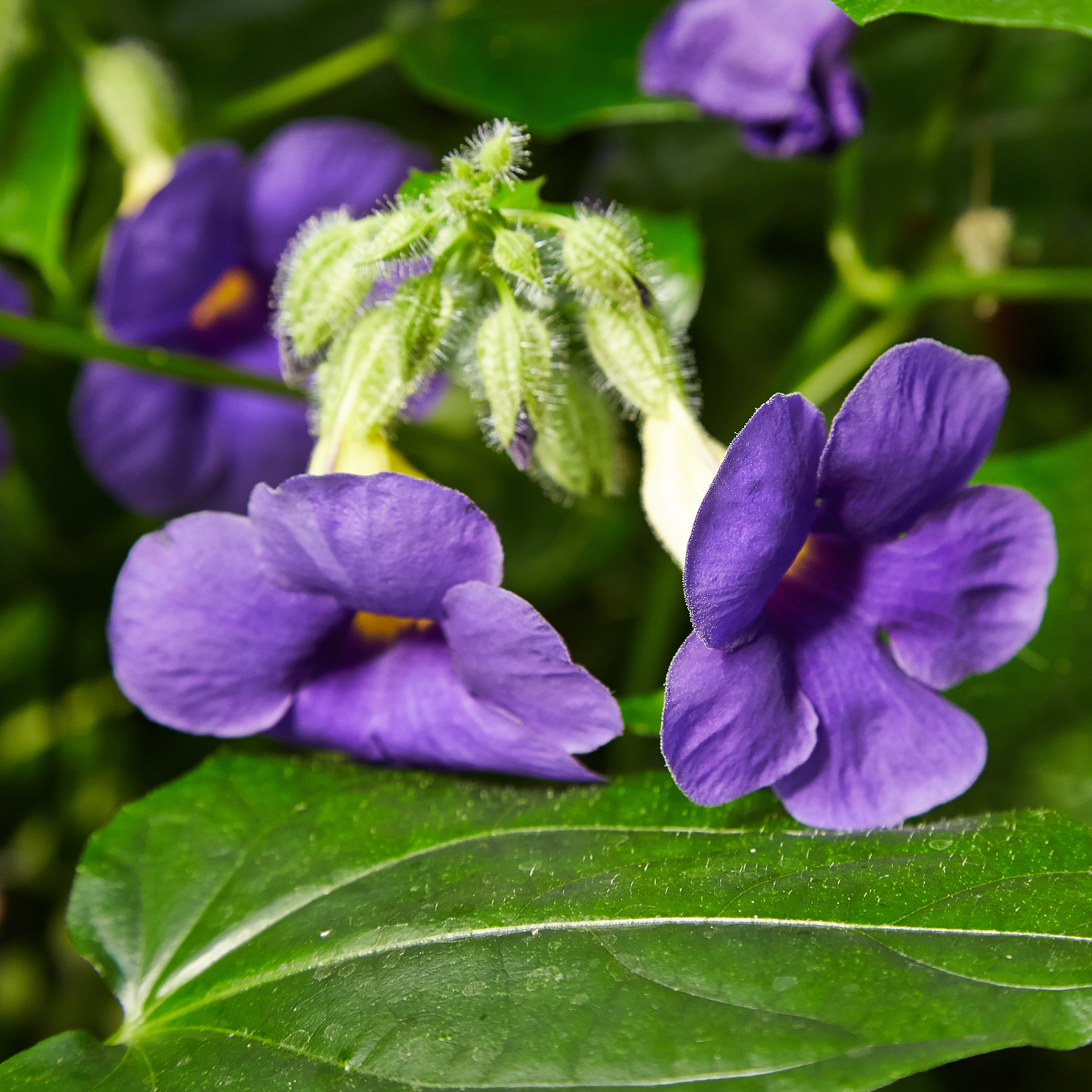

Scientific classification
- Kingdom: Plantae
- Clade: Tracheophytes
- Clade: Angiosperms
- Clade: Eudicots
- Clade: Asterids
- Order: Lamiales
- Family: Acanthaceae
- Genus: Thunbergia
- Species: T. natalensis

Binomial name
- Thunbergia natalensis Hook.

= Thunbergia natalensis =

Species of flowering plant

Thunbergia natalensis is a species of flowering plant in the family Acanthaceae, that is native to parts of mainland Africa, including South Africa (Limpopo, Mpulamanga, KwaZulu-Natal, East Cape Province), Eswatini, Tanzania, Ethiopia, Malawi and Zimbabwe. It occurs in forest margins, bush and grassland. Normally evergreen, it responds to dry or cold winters by losing its leaves and going dormant. Common names include dwarf thunbergia, Natal blue thunbergia and Natal blue-bell.

This handsome plant is cultivated in temperate regions for its masses of summer-flowering pale blue, trumpet-shaped blooms against dark hairy leaves. Growing to around 1 m (3.3 ft) tall, it is best displayed as groundcover in a partially-shaded position.

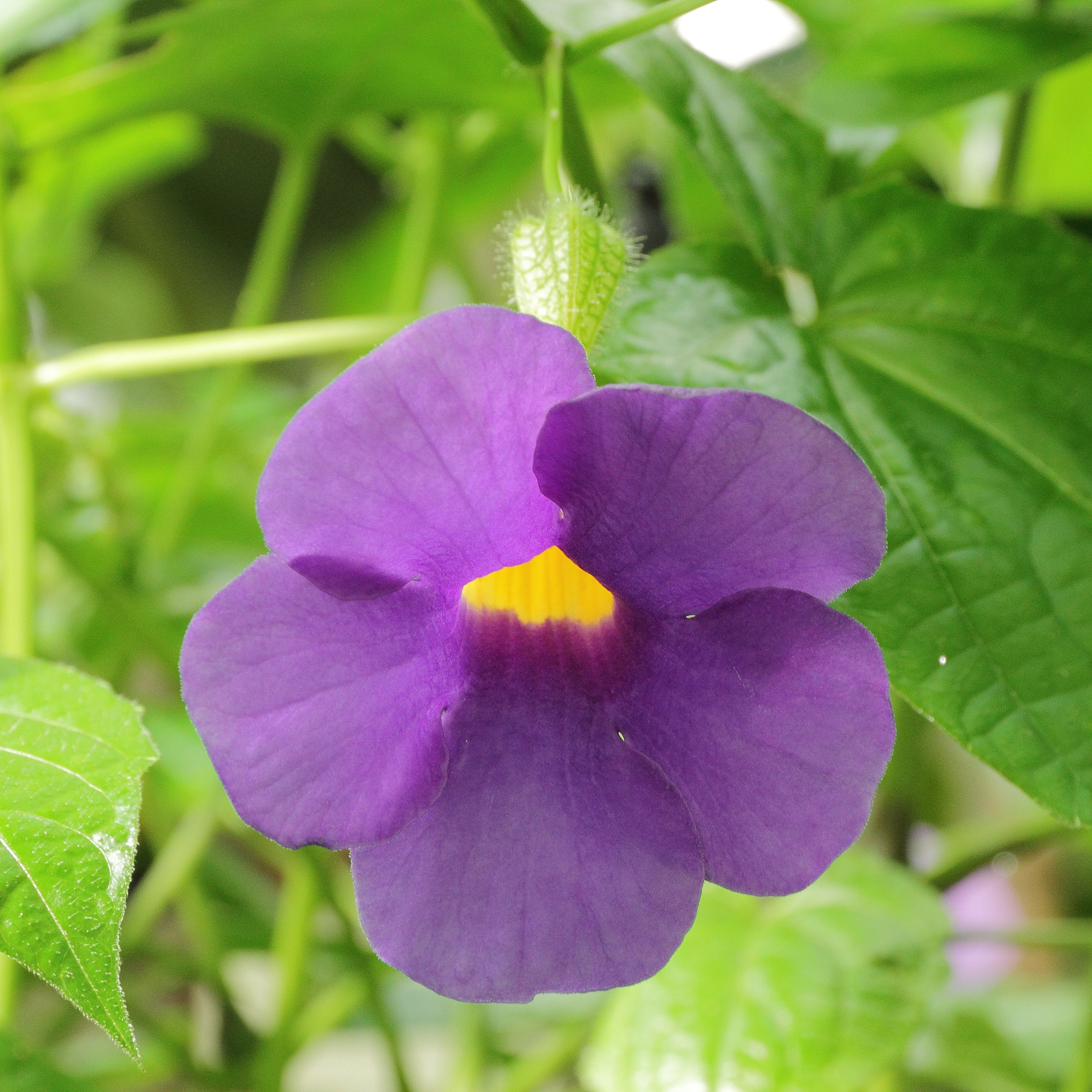

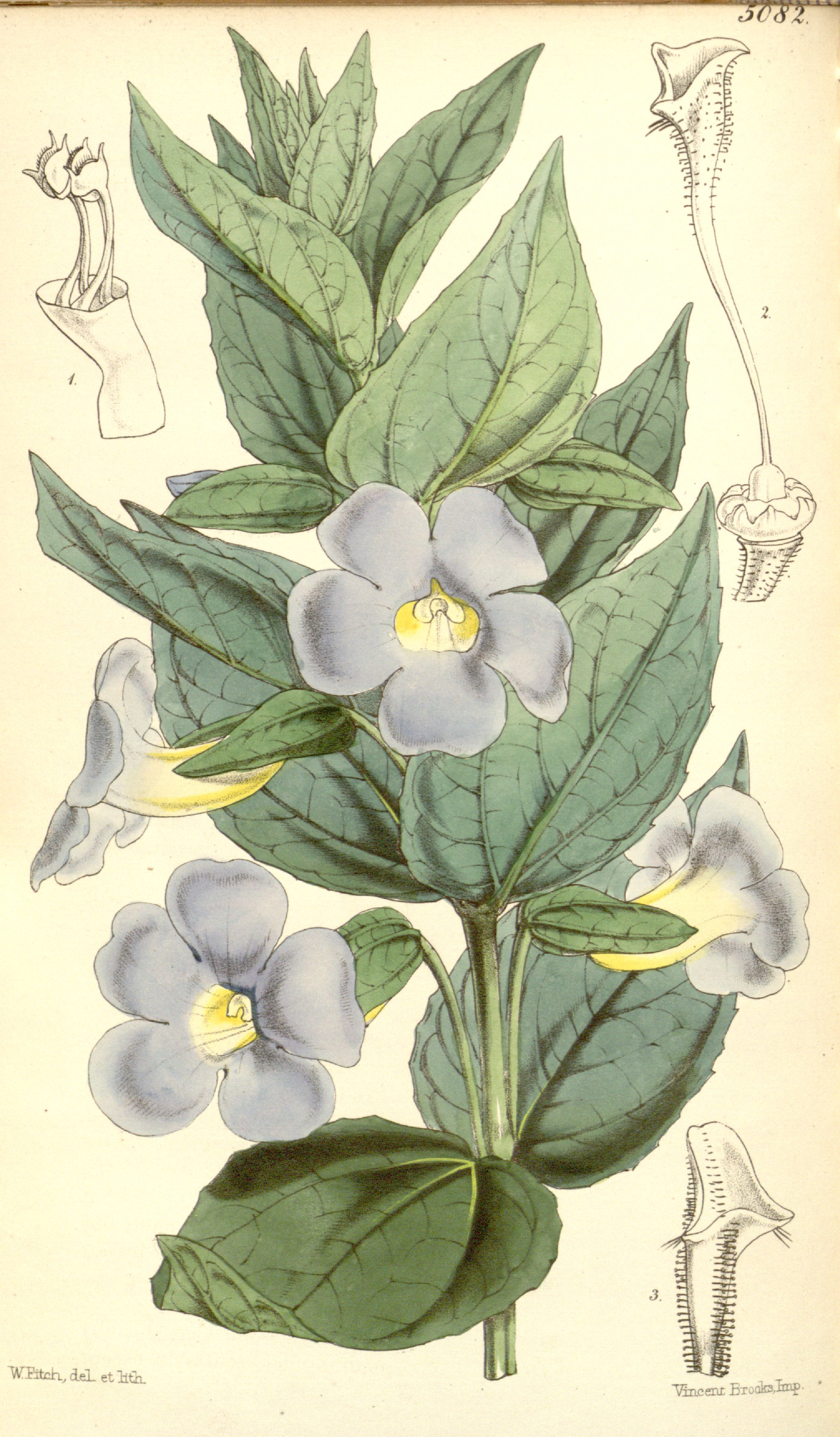

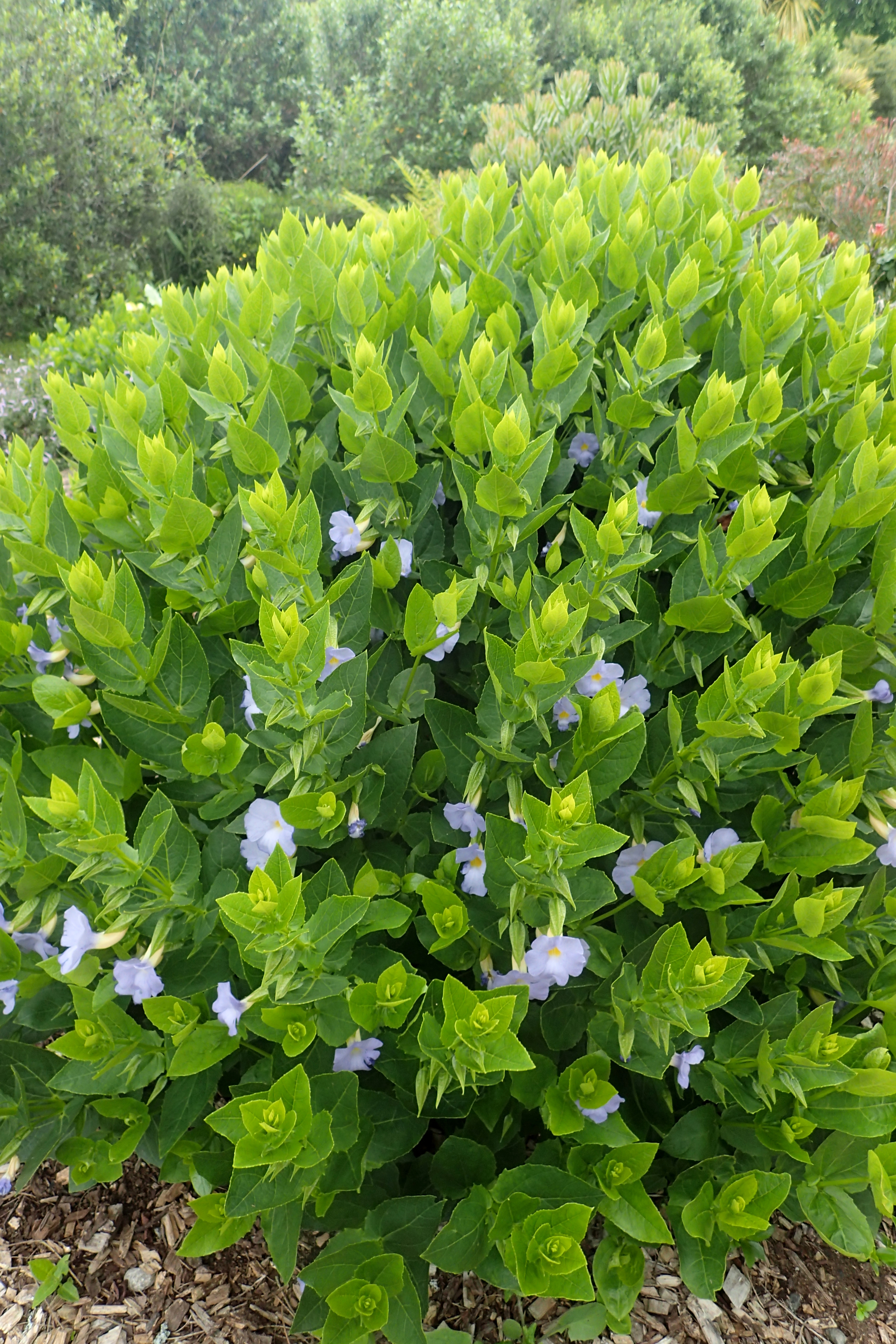

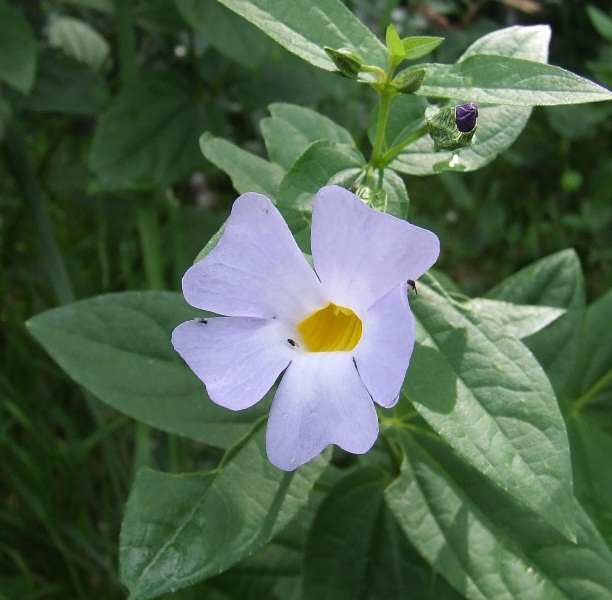
