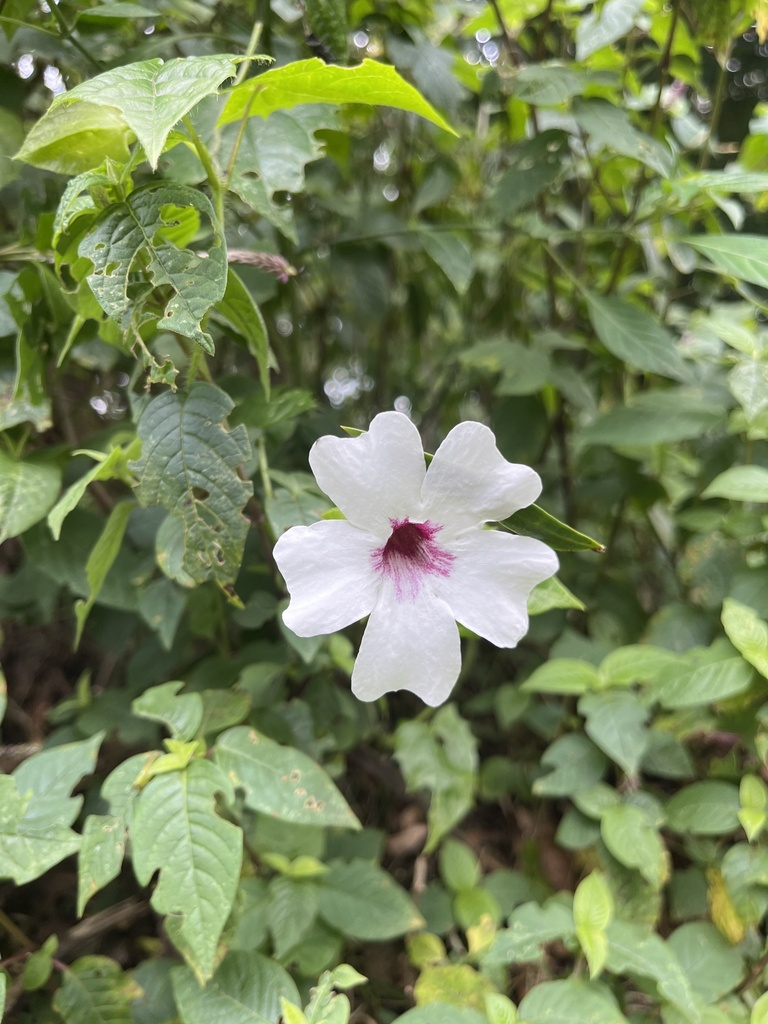

Scientific classification
- Kingdom: Plantae
- Clade: Tracheophytes
- Clade: Angiosperms
- Clade: Eudicots
- Clade: Asterids
- Order: Lamiales
- Family: Acanthaceae
- Genus: Thunbergia
- Species: T. mildbraediana

Binomial name
- Thunbergia mildbraediana Lebrun & L.Touss.

= Thunbergia mildbraediana =

Species of flowering plant

Thunbergia mildbraediana is a species of flowering plant within the family Acanthaceae.

== Description ==
Thunbergia mildbraediana is a herbaceous climbing plant that can reach up to 2 meters in length. It is a perennial species. Its stems are sparsely pilose, with dense hairs forming two distinct bands.

=== Leaves ===
The leaves are non-winged on their petioles, which measure 2–6 cm long, and are similarly covered with sparse pilosity. The leaf blades are triangular-ovate, ranging from 4.5 to 10.5 cm long and 2–5.5 cm wide, with an acuminate apex, a deeply cordate base, and sagittate lobes. The margins are subentire to coarsely dentate, and the underside of the leaves has denser pilosity along the veins.

=== Flowers ===
The flowers of Thunbergia mildbraediana are axillary and solitary, with pedicels that measure 4–9 cm long and are sparsely pilose. The bracteoles are green, ovate to narrowly so, 2.7–3.5 cm long, with prominent veins and reticulation. These bracteoles are acute to acuminate at the apex and distinctly cordate with a 4-angular base. The calyx is puberulous, with stalked capitate glands and occasionally intermixed hairs. The rim of the calyx is 1–2 mm high, with linear segments 3–6 mm long. The corolla is typically white with a reddish-purple throat, although some rare variations may feature a pale yellow throat. The tubular portion of the corolla is 5–12 mm long, while the campanulate throat is 1.3–2.5 cm long and 1–1.5 cm in diameter. The lobes of the corolla are deeply emarginate, measuring 1–2.2 cm long and 1–2.4 cm wide. The filaments are 5–8 mm long, and the anthers are about 3 mm long, rounded or indistinctly apiculate, and densely bearded at the base and along one side.

=== Fruit and seeds ===
The fruit of Thunbergia mildbraediana is a glabrous, depressed globose capsule, measuring 9–12 mm in diameter and 11–14 mm in height, with a beak that extends 13–25 mm long. The seed is dark brown, around 7 mm in diameter, with a lamellate edge and a reticulate pattern near the center.

== Distribution and habitat ==
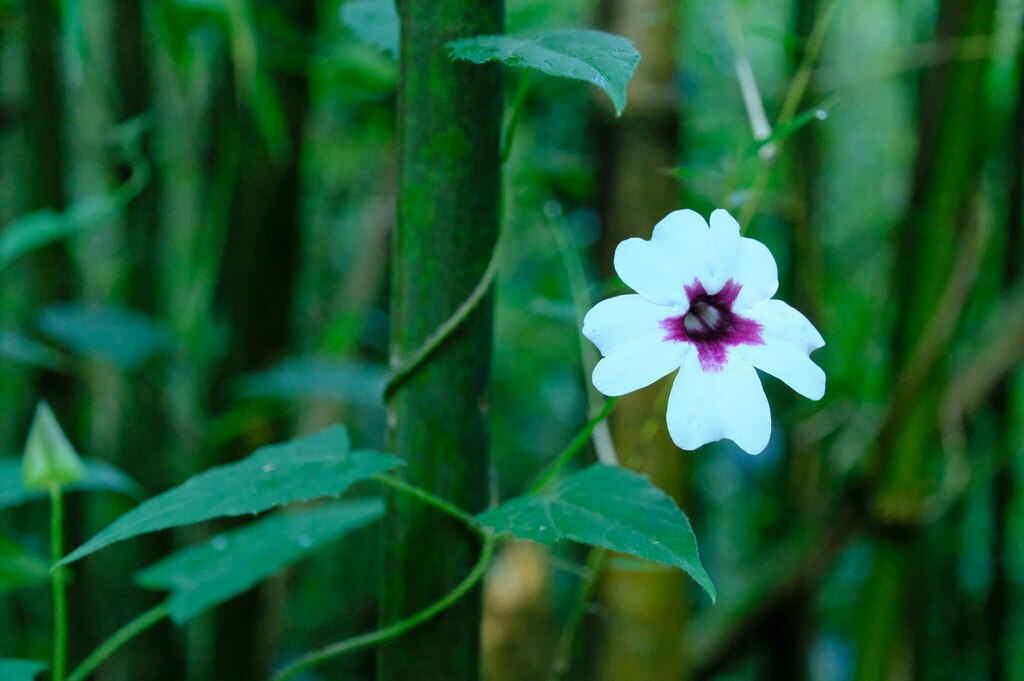
Growing in a bamboo forest.

Thunbergia mildbraediana can be found within the African countries of Burundi, Congo, Rwanda, Tanzania and Uganda. The species grows in countries that exhibit wet tropical climates. It utilizes mountainous habitat where it inhabits both rainforests and bamboo forests. Plants have been found at elevations ranging from 750 to 2,950 metres above sea level.

== Threats ==
Thunbergia mildbraediana can survive some habitat disturbance, however requires forest habitat to survive. The species is threatened by deforestation of their forest habitat, with forests often being cleared to make room for agriculture such as grazing livestock and farming crops. Due to plants requiring a forest habitat to survive it has led to the species becoming increasingly threatened especially in areas where forests have been almost completely deforested.
