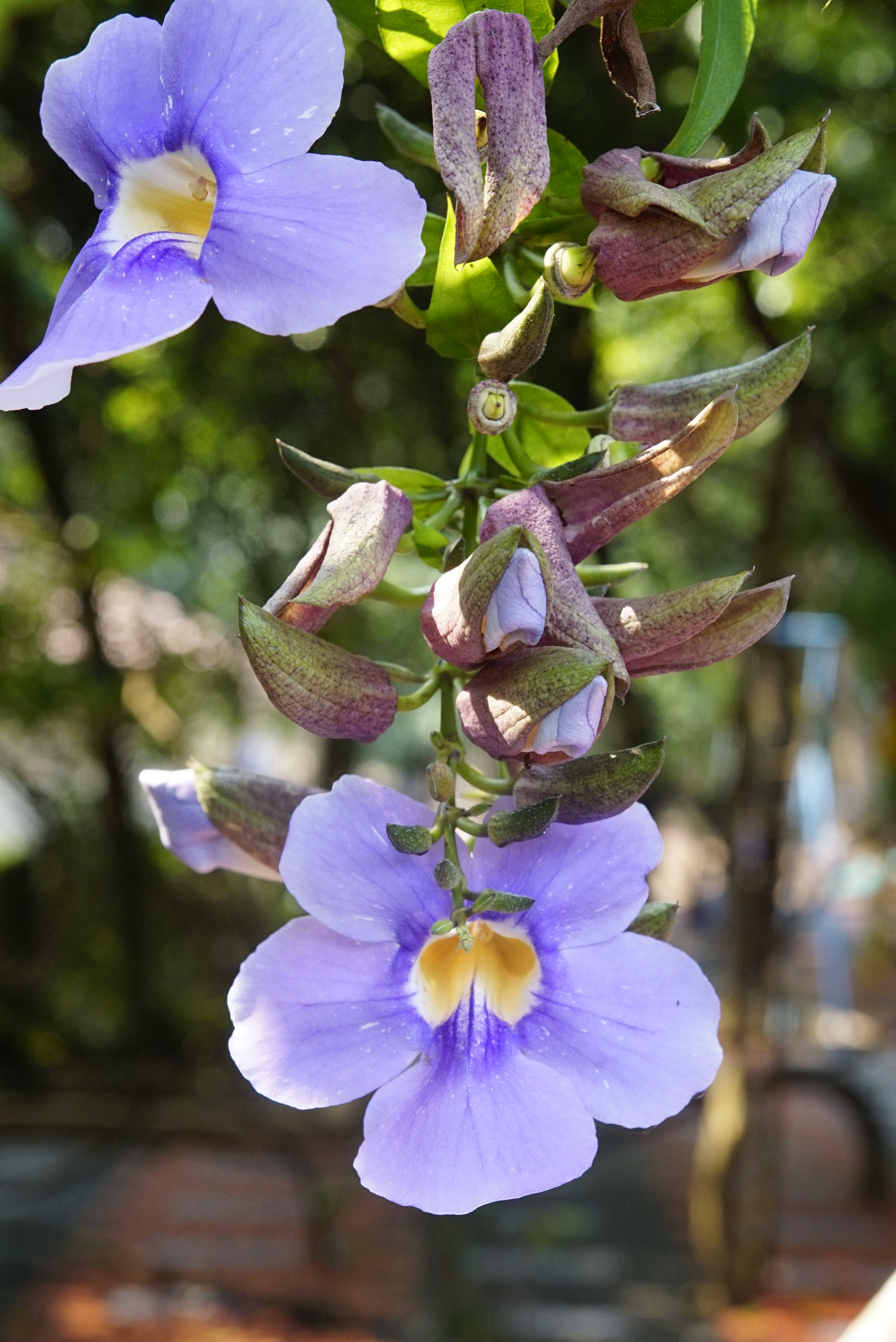
- Flowers of Thunbergia laurifolia

Scientific classification
- Kingdom: Plantae
- Clade: Tracheophytes
- Clade: Angiosperms
- Clade: Eudicots
- Clade: Asterids
- Order: Lamiales
- Family: Acanthaceae
- Genus: Thunbergia
- Species: T. laurifolia

Binomial name
- Thunbergia laurifolia Lindl.

= Thunbergia laurifolia =

Species of flowering plant

Thunbergia laurifolia, the laurel clockvine or blue trumpet vine, is native to India and Thailand and the Indomalayan realm, the species occurs from Indochina to Malaysia.

== Description ==
Thunbergia laurifolia leaves are opposite, heart-shaped with serrated leaf margin and taper to a pointed tip. This species is very similar in appearance to T. grandiflora, but has longer, thinner leaves and its young stems and leaves are hairless.

The flowers are not scented and borne on pendulous inflorescences. The hermaphrodite flower is trumpet-shaped with a short broad tube, white outside and yellowish inside. The corolla is pale blue in colour with 5–7 petals, one larger than the others. Plants flower almost continuously throughout the year with flowers opening early in the morning and aborting in the evening of the same day. Carpenter bees are frequent visitors, creeping into the flowers for pollen and nectar while black ants are present probably as nectar scavengers. The plant develops a very tuberous root system.

== Uses ==
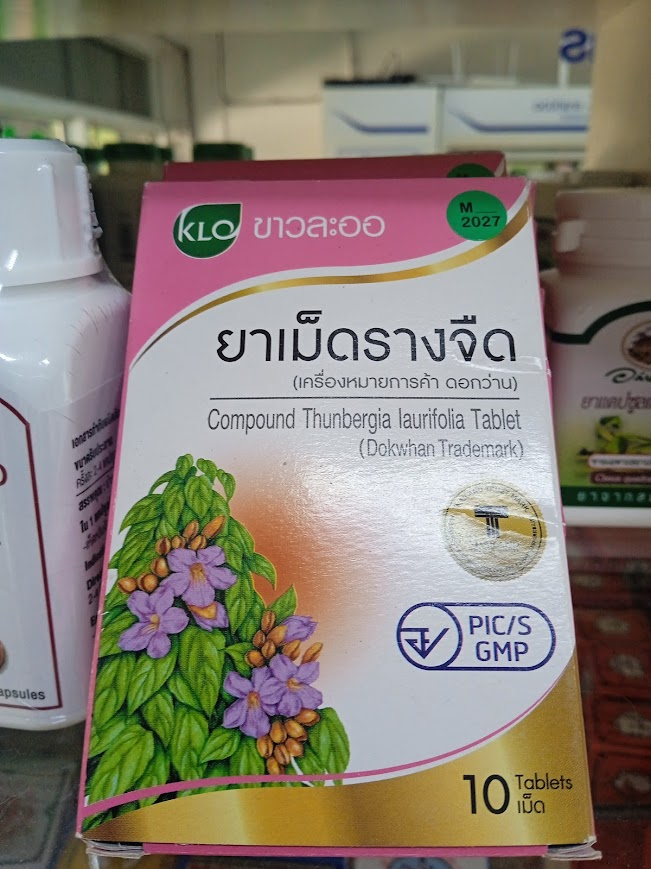
Thunbergia laurifolia tablets in Thailand

=== Cultivation ===
Thunbergia laurifolia is a popular ornamental plant in tropical gardens. It is a long-blooming vine in cultivation. Propagation is from stem cuttings or shoots from the tuberous roots. It is a fast-growing perennial herbaceous climber. It has become an exotic weed in many tropical countries.

=== Teas and medicinal ===
In Malaysia, juice from crushed leaves of T. laurifolia are taken for menorrhagia, placed into the ear for deafness, and applied for poulticing cuts and boils. In Thailand, leaves are used as an antipyretic, as well as for detoxifying poisons. It is locally known as akar tuau in Malaysia and rang jeud (รางจืด) in Thailand. Several Thai herbal companies have started producing and exporting rang jeud tea.

T. laurifolia is used in Thailand for patients in drug addiction treatment, and two studies on lab rats show T. laurifolia may stimulate dopamine production.

=== Chemistry ===
Iridoid glucosides have been isolated from T. laurifolia. Microwave-dried leaves displayed stronger antioxidant properties than fresh leaves. The antioxidant properties of the infusion from microwave-dried leaves is higher than the commercial rang jeud tea from Thailand.

== Invasive species ==
Thunbergia laurifolia can become an invasive species where escaping from ornamental garden uses into native habitats in supportive climates. Because it is a fast-growing perennial plant it has become an escaped exotic and noxious weed in many tropical countries The plant has become a weed found in the Cerrado vegetation of Brazil and in tropical areas of Australia.

== See also ==
- Flora of India
