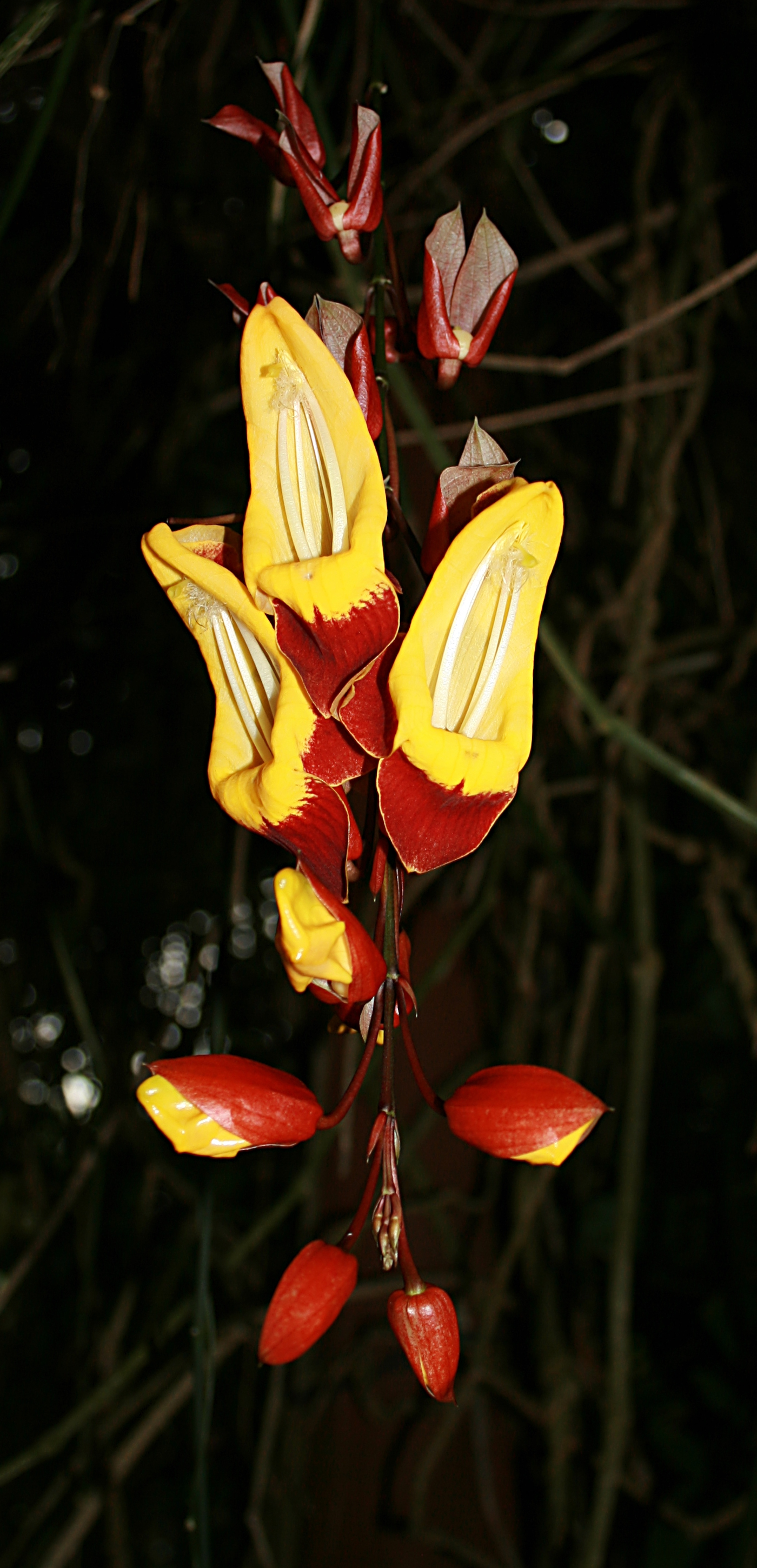
- Thunbergia mysorensis in the Cairns Botanical Gardens

Scientific classification
- Kingdom: Plantae
- Clade: Tracheophytes
- Clade: Angiosperms
- Clade: Eudicots
- Clade: Asterids
- Order: Lamiales
- Family: Acanthaceae
- Genus: Thunbergia
- Species: T. mysorensis

Binomial name
- Thunbergia mysorensis (Wight) T.Anderson ex Bedd., 1865

Synonyms
- Hexacentris mysorensis Wight

= Thunbergia mysorensis =

Species of flowering plant

Thunbergia mysorensis, the Mysore trumpetvine or lady's slipper vine, is a species of flowering plant in the family Acanthaceae. A woody-stemmed evergreen, this vine is native to southern tropical India. The specific epithet mysorensis is derived from the city of Mysore.

== Description ==
Thunbergia mysorensis often reaches 6 metres (20 ft) and has long narrow medium green leaves. The dramatic and very large pendent hanging blossoms have individual flowers in a bold curved shape. This is enhanced by their being a rich saturated yellow, with maroon to brownish red outer tip coloring. The vine blooms from spring to autumn.

== Cultivation ==
Thunbergia mysorensis is cultivated as a popular ornamental plant in tropical and sub-tropical gardens, conservatories and greenhouses. It grows quickly in frost-free temperate climates, such as coastal Southern California, with flowers draping down from pergolas and other garden structures. Its sweet nectar is attractive to sunbirds, a very small passerine bird, and hummingbirds. It has gained the Royal Horticultural Society's Award of Garden Merit. Ornamental horticulture is also a pathway for this species to become invasive spreading to, for example, all three bioregions of Ecuador where it is the most recently documented species of Thunbergia to become invasive.

== Gallery ==
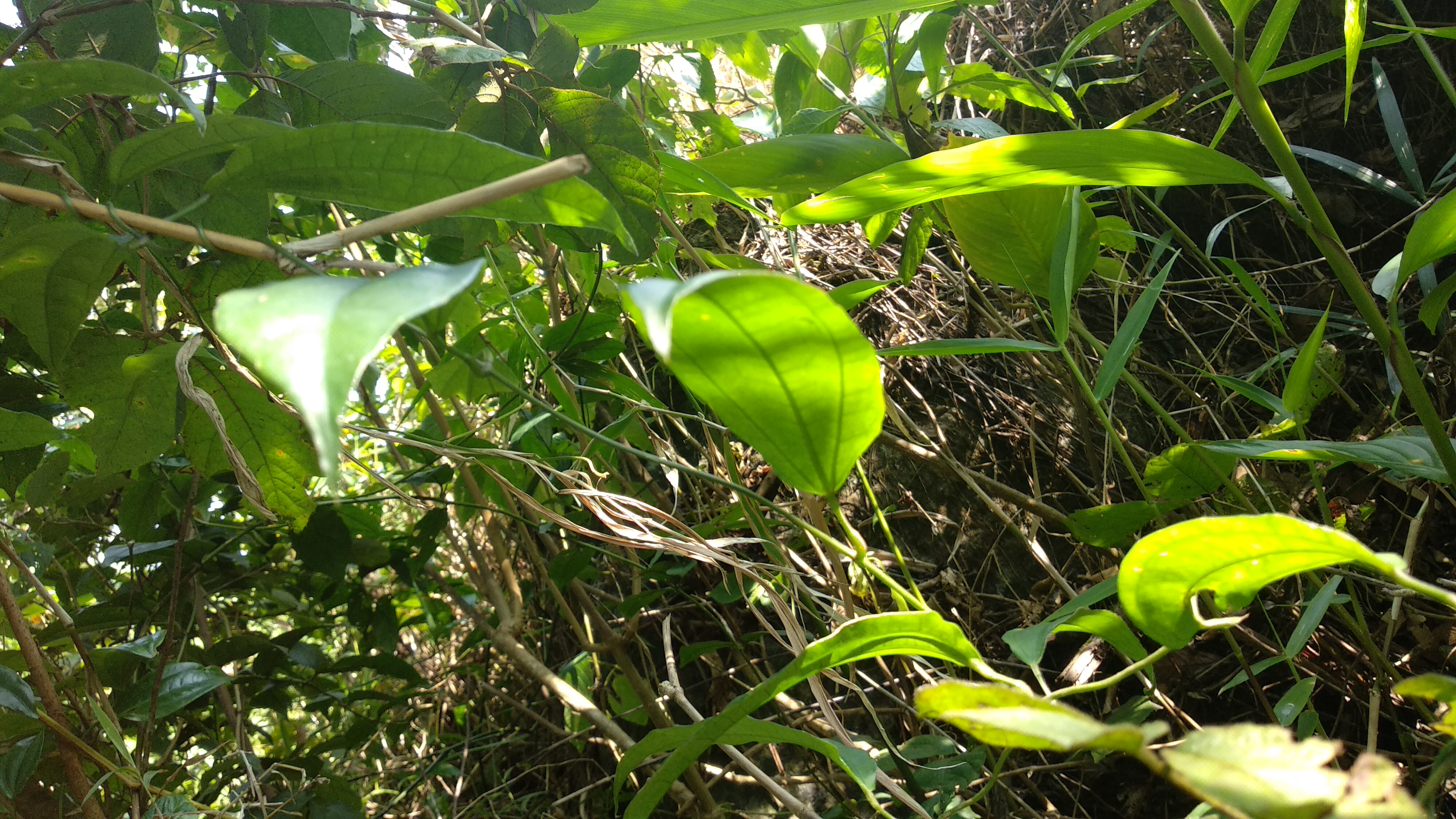
Thunbergia mysorensis Mysore trumpetvine leaves seen close-Up left.

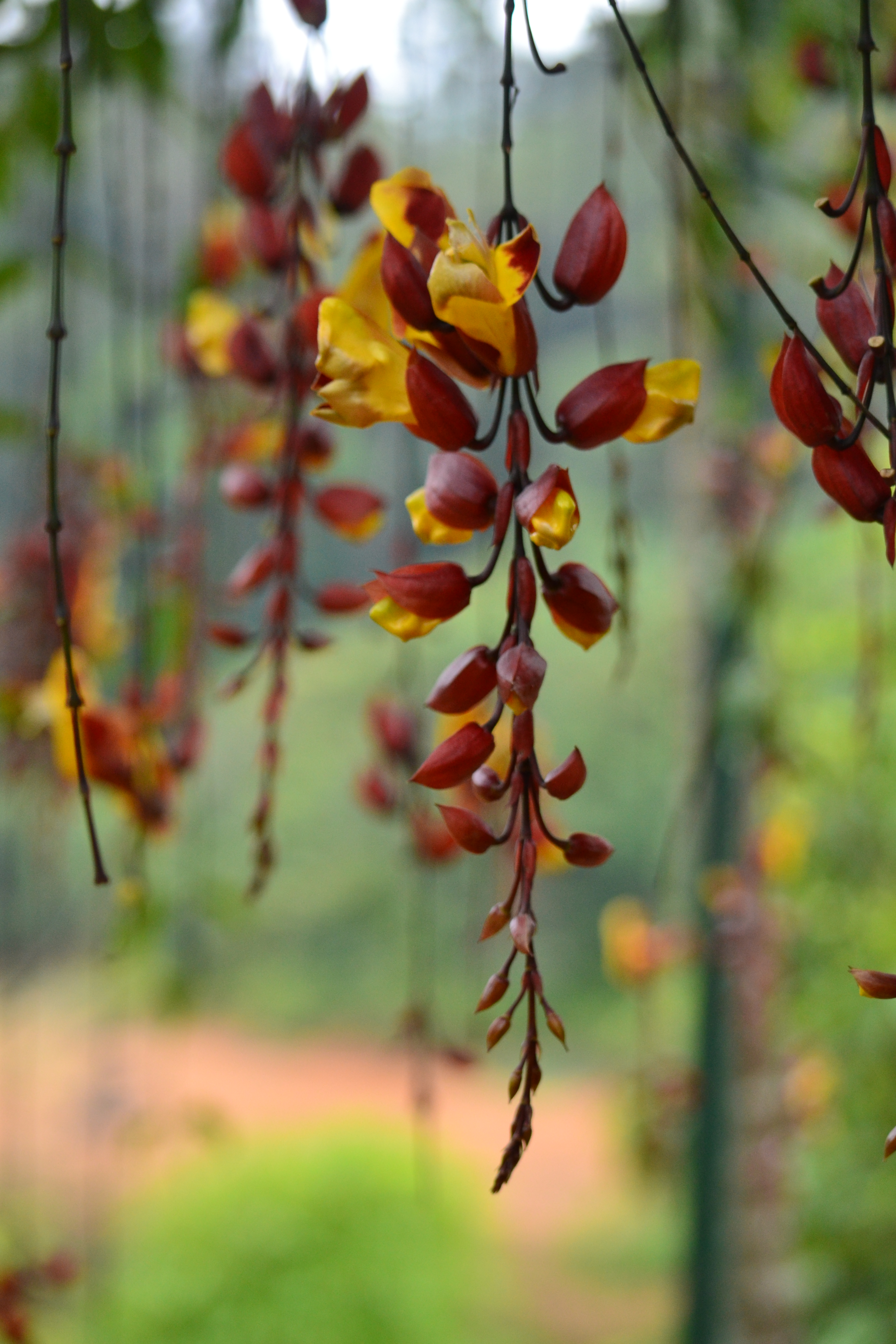
Lady shoe flower (Thunbergia mysorensis) in Gavi, Kerala

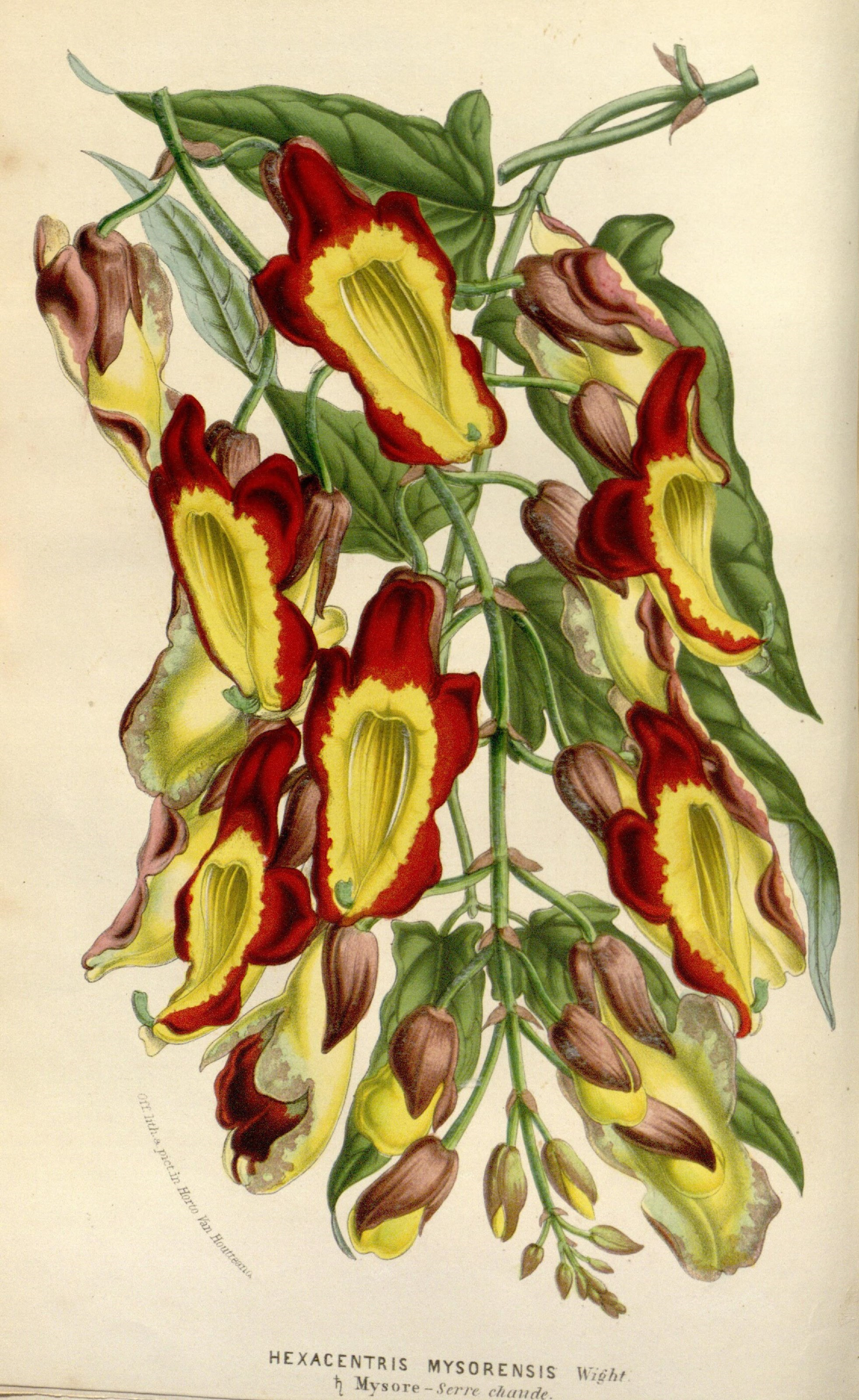
H. mysorensis (van Houtte, L. (1853)

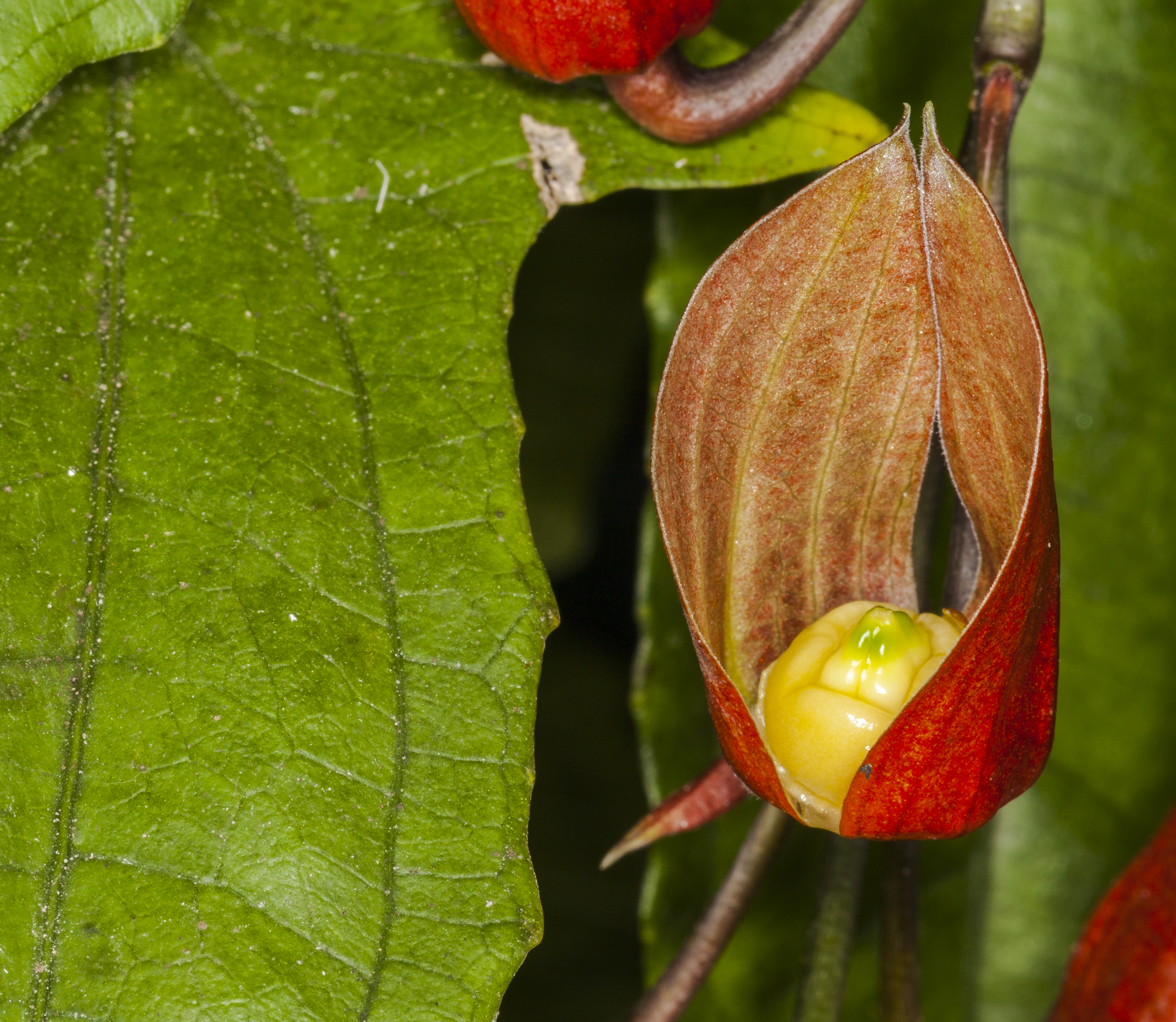
Detail
