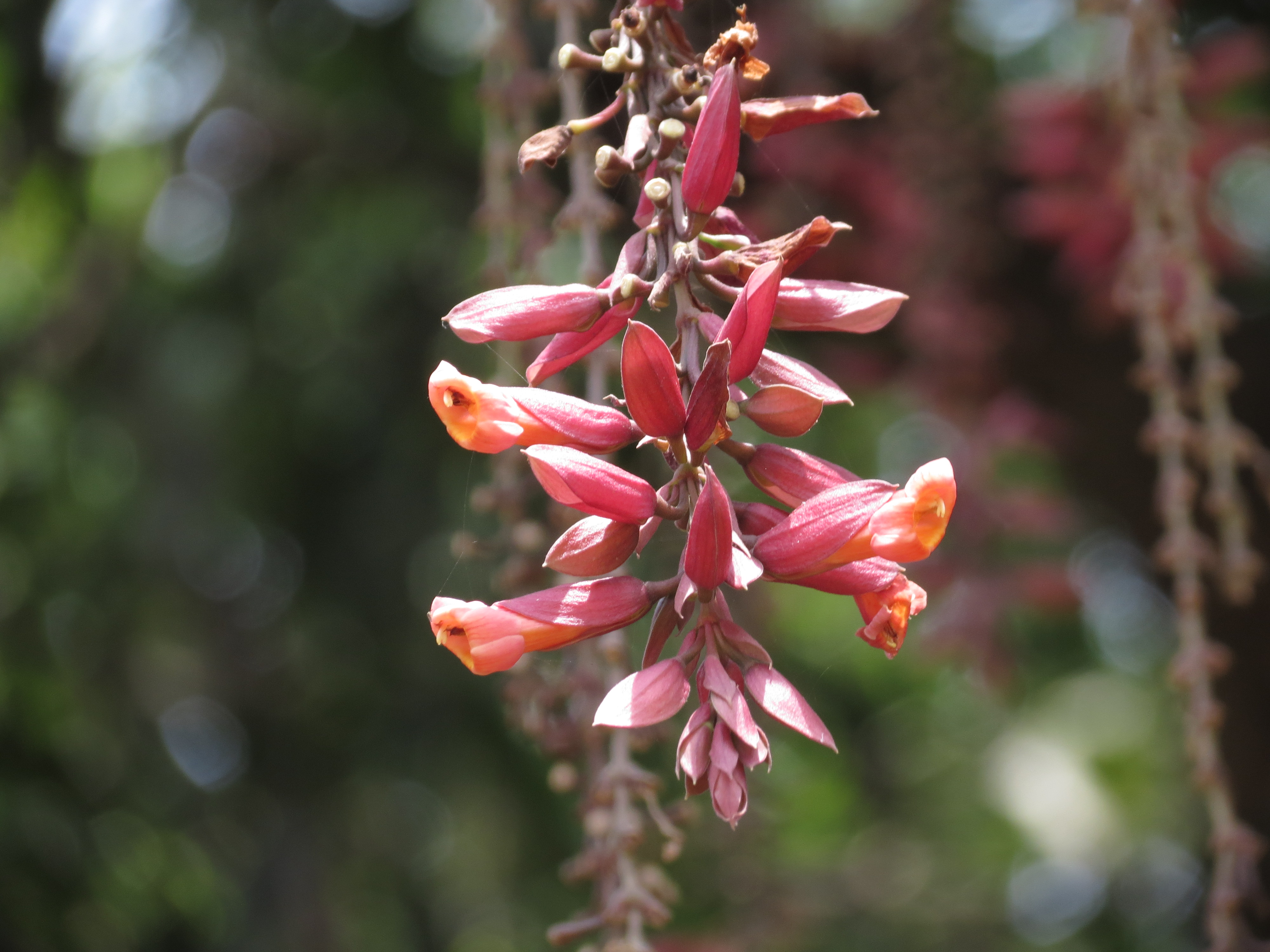

Scientific classification
- Kingdom: Plantae
- Clade: Tracheophytes
- Clade: Angiosperms
- Clade: Eudicots
- Clade: Asterids
- Order: Lamiales
- Family: Acanthaceae
- Genus: Thunbergia
- Species: T. coccinea

Binomial name
- Thunbergia coccinea Wall. ex D.Don

Synonyms
- Hexacentris coccinea (Wall.) Nees; Flemingia coccinea Buch.-Ham. ex Nees.; Hexacentris acuminata Nees; Hexacentris dentata Nees; Thunbergia pendula Hassk.; Thunbergia quinquenervis Buch.-Ham. ex Nees

= Thunbergia coccinea =

Species of flowering plant

Thunbergia coccinea, also known as the scarlet clock vine, is a species of flowering plant within the family Acanthaceae.

== Description ==
Thunbergia coccinea is a perennial species, possessing a tuberous root system. Plants produce climbing vines that can reach lengths ranging from 3 - 8 metres. Leaves are arranged oppositely with an ovate or lanceolate leaf shape. The leaf margin is dentate, while the ventilation of the leaf is pinnate, both sides of the leaf are pubescent. Plants bloom between the months of January and April, producing red tubular flowers. Once pollinated plants will produce loculicidal glabrous fruiting capsules. Thunbergia coccinea is capable of sexual reproduction through seed, but can also reproduce asexually through vegetative reproduction.

== Distribution ==
Thunbergia coccinea is native across South and Southeast Asia, including Assam, Bangladesh, South-Central China, the East and West Himalayas, India, Laos, Myanmar, Nepal, Thailand, Tibet, and Vietnam. The species has also been introduced outside of its native range into various countries including Pakistan, Sri Lanka and New Zealand.

== Habitat ==
Thunbergia coccinea grows within wet tropical climates.

== Medicinal uses ==
Thunbergia coccinea is utilized as a medicinal plant by the tribes of Assam, India. The plant is used medicinally to treat a wide variety of issues such as pain, fever, inflammation and eye infections. The plant has also been used medicinally as diabetes medication.
