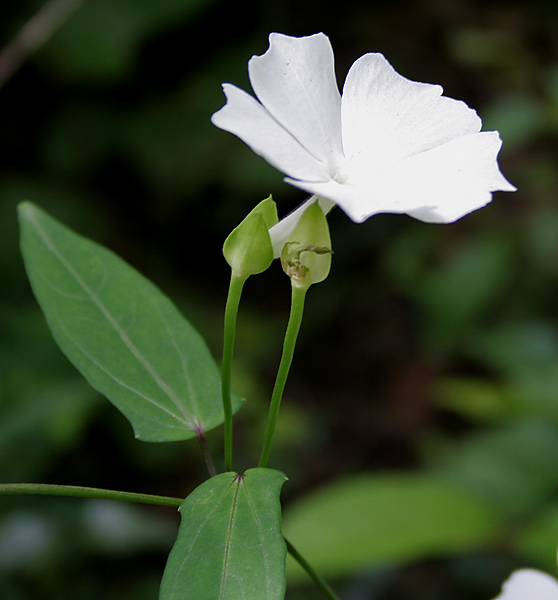

Scientific classification
- Kingdom: Plantae
- Clade: Tracheophytes
- Clade: Angiosperms
- Clade: Eudicots
- Clade: Asterids
- Order: Lamiales
- Family: Acanthaceae
- Genus: Thunbergia
- Species: T. fragrans

Binomial name
- Thunbergia fragrans Roxb.

Synonyms
- List: Meyenia longiflora Benth. ex Hohen.; Thunbergia bodinieri H.Lév.; Thunbergia cordata Colla; Thunbergia hainanensis C.Y.Wu & H.S.Lo; Thunbergia java Hoffmanns.; Thunbergia linearifolia Bremek.; Thunbergia loheri Bremek.; Thunbergia longiflora F.Muell.; Thunbergia mindanaensis Bremek.; Thunbergia roxburghia Nees; Thunbergia scandens Pers. ex Nees; Thunbergia subsagittata Blanco; Thunbergia volubilis Pers.; Roxburghia rostrata Russell ex Nees

= Thunbergia fragrans =

Species of flowering plant

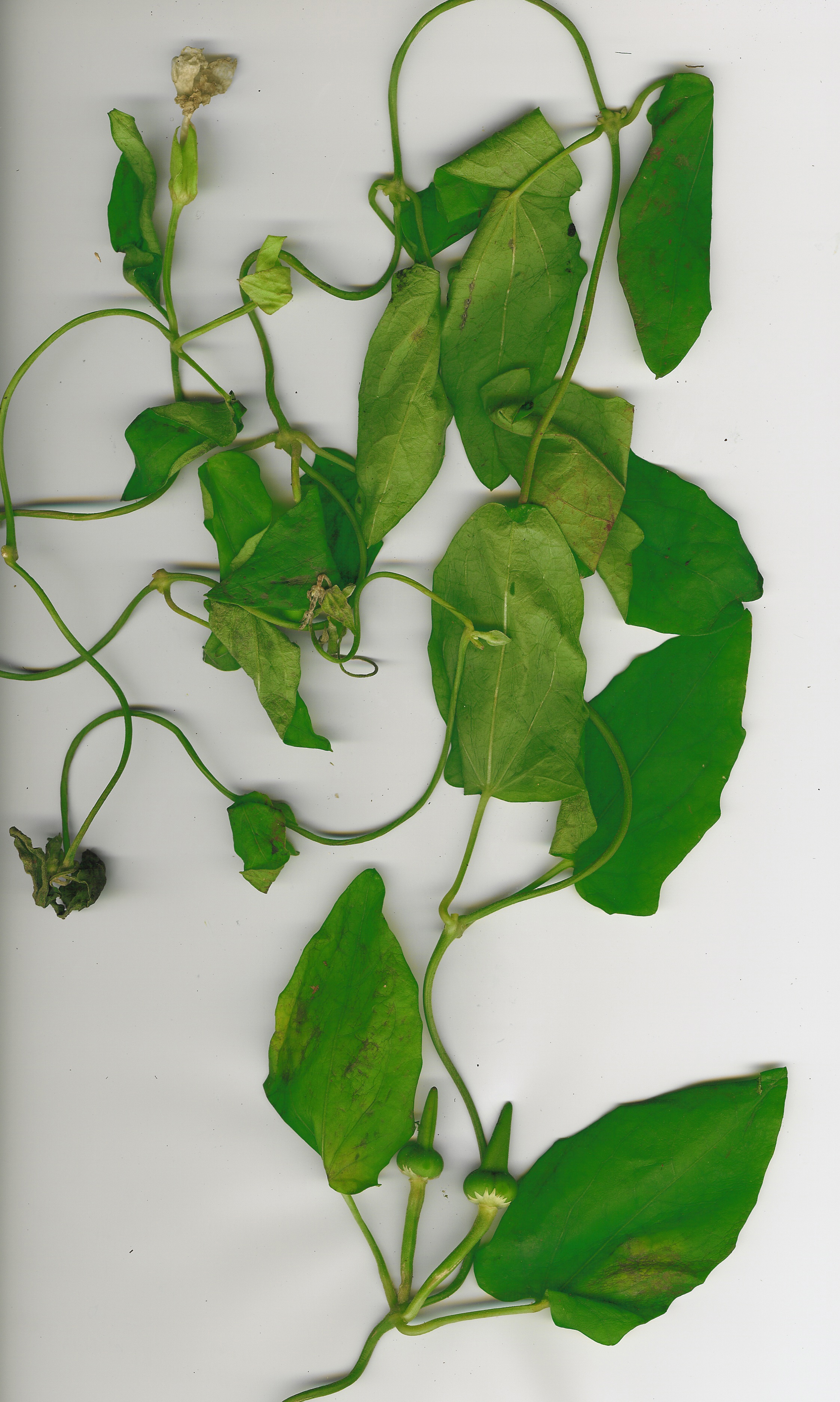
Thunbergia fragrans

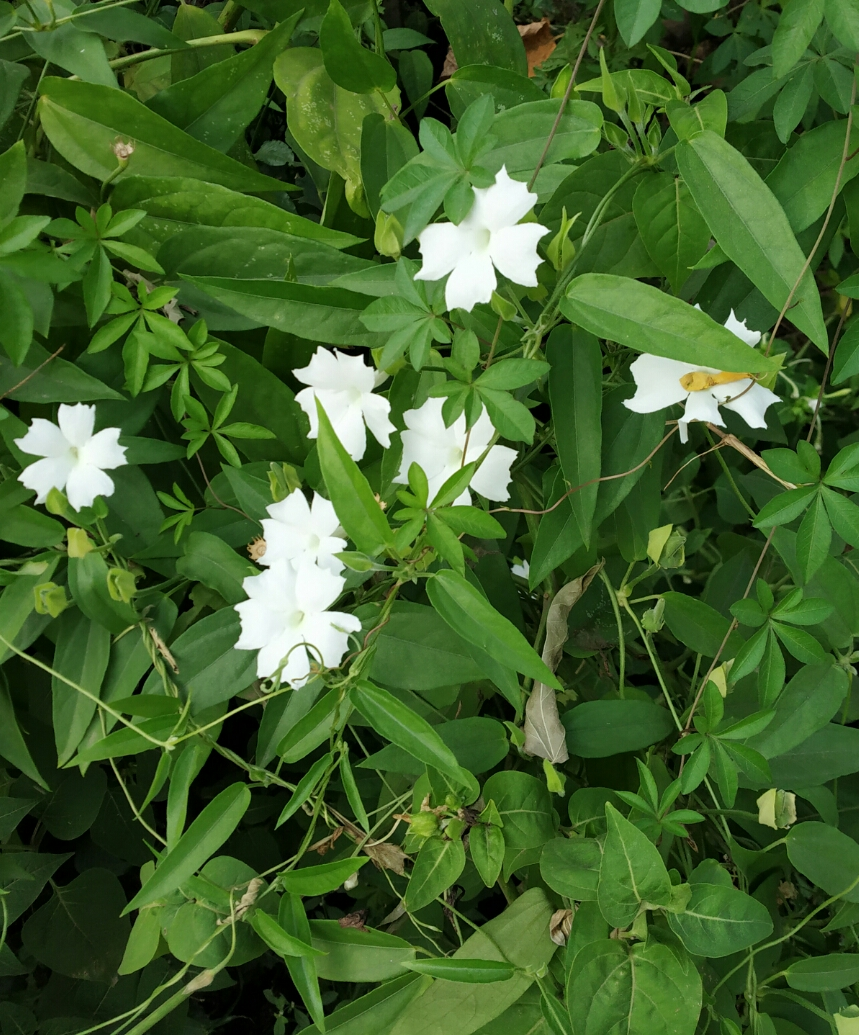
Specimen in jharkhand, India

Thunbergia fragrans, the whitelady is a perennial climbing twiner in the family Acanthaceae, native to South and Southeast Asia and China.

== Distribution ==
It is native to South and Southeast Asia and China. The species is also widely introduced in other tropical and subtropical areas including Florida Hawaii, Australia, New Caledonia, French Polynesia, Caribbean and Indian Ocean islands, southern Africa and Central America. In many places it is considered as an invasive species.

=== Usage ===
In Indian Siddha medicine, the species is known as indrapushapa and a paste made out of tender twigs of the is used to combat fever and sometimes applied on cuts and wounds. The leaves are used as a poultice in skin diseases, their juice can also be applied on the head to cure headaches.
