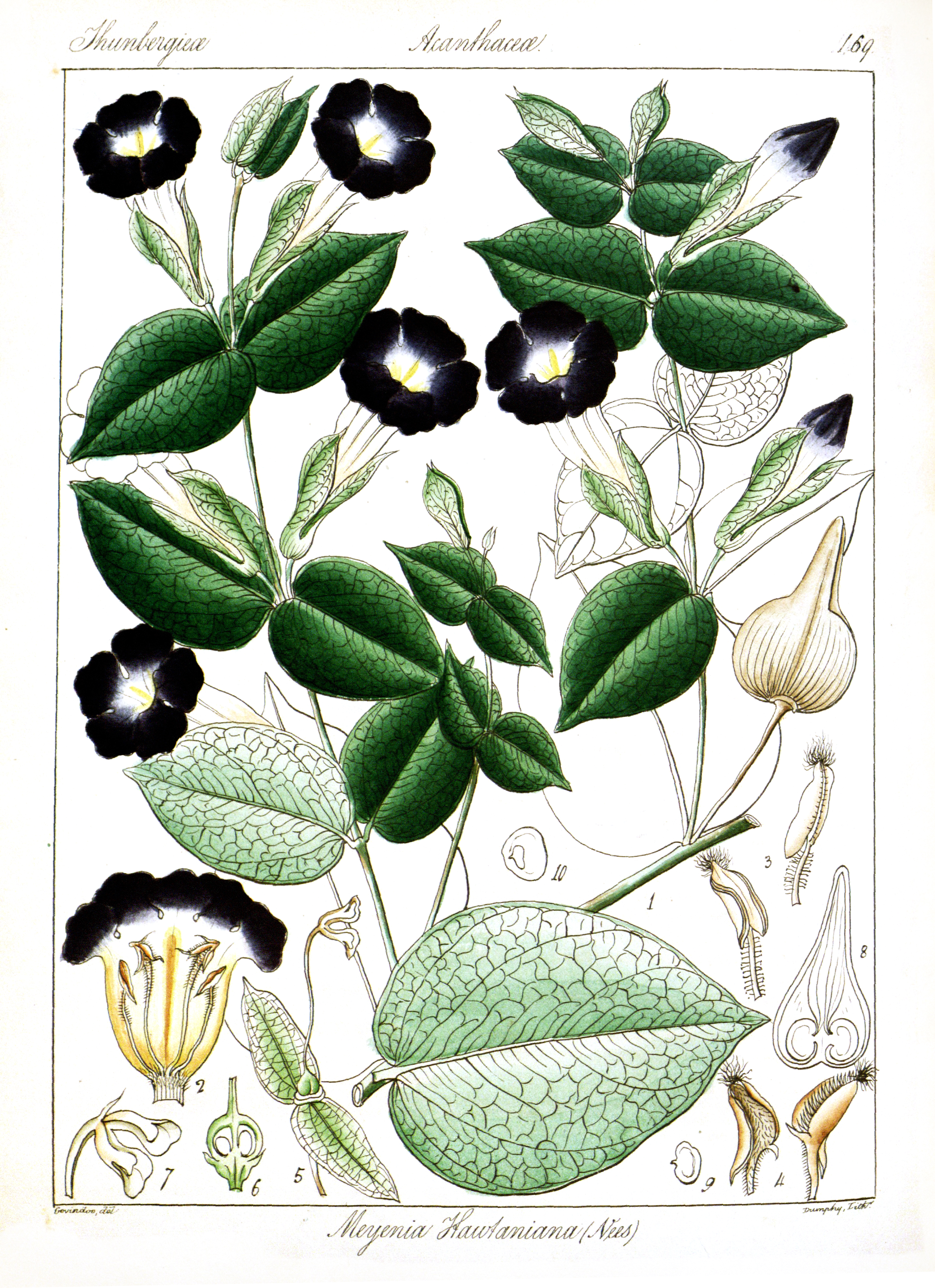
- M. hawtayneana

Scientific classification
- Kingdom: Plantae
- Clade: Tracheophytes
- Clade: Angiosperms
- Clade: Eudicots
- Clade: Asterids
- Order: Lamiales
- Family: Acanthaceae
- Genus: Meyenia; Nees (1832)
- Species: M. hawtayneana

Binomial name
- Meyenia hawtayneana (Wall.) Nees (1832)

Synonyms
- Thunbergia coerulea Wight ex Nees (1832); Thunbergia cordifolia Wall. (1829), not validly publ.; Thunbergia erecta Nees (1832), pro syn.; Thunbergia hawtayneana Wall. (1826); Thunbergia hawtaynii T.Anderson (1867), orth. var.

= Meyenia =

Genus of flowering plants

Meyenia hawtayneana is a species of flowering plant in the family Acanthaceae. It is a liana native to India, Bangladesh, Myanmar, and Vietnam. It is the sole species in genus Meyenia.
