= List of Thunbergia species =

Thunbergia is a genus of plants in the family Acanthaceae. As of January 2025, Plants of the World Online accepted 150 species.

== A ==
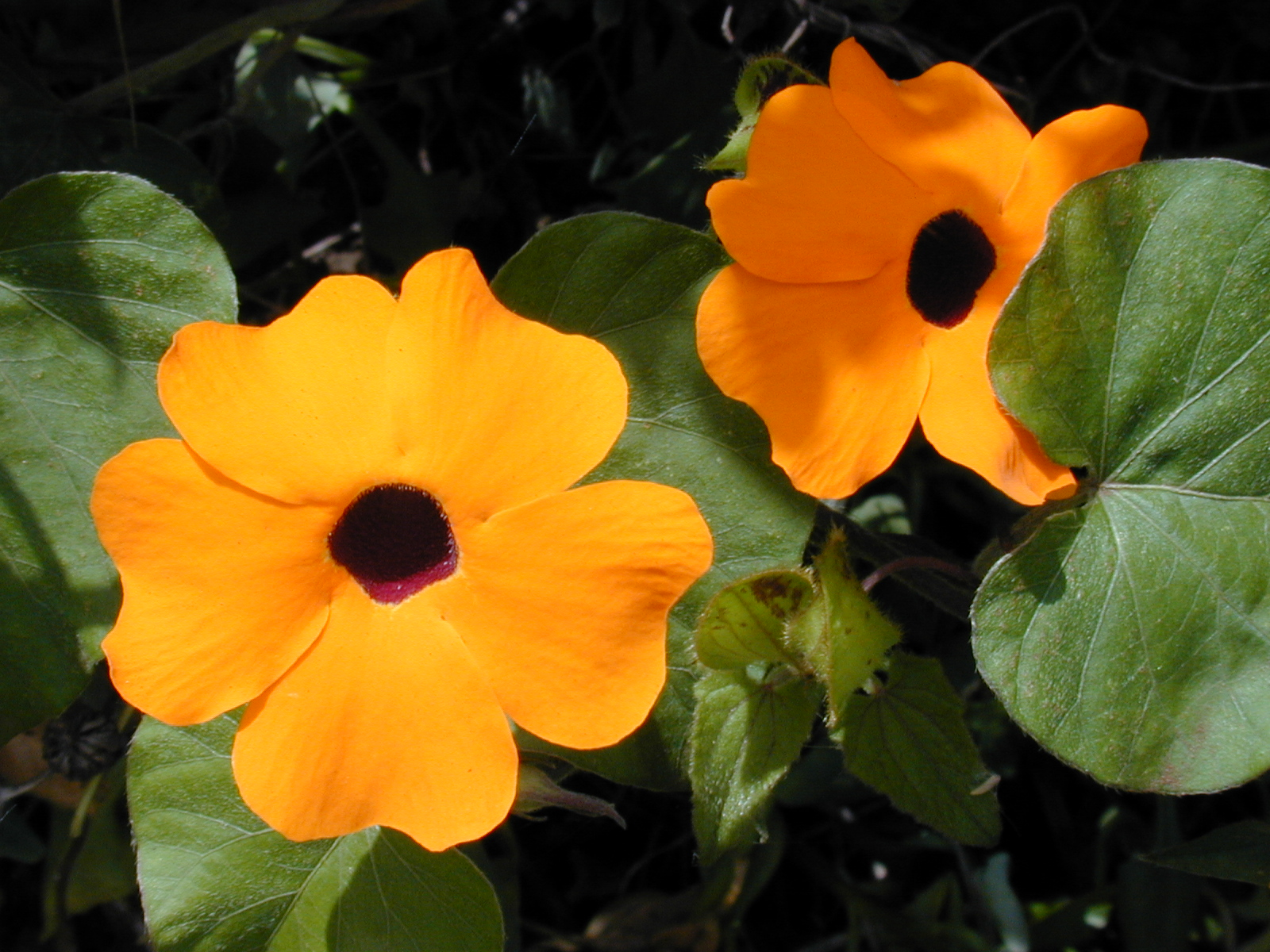
Thunbergia alata

- Thunbergia adenocalyx Radlk.
- Thunbergia affinis S.Moore
- Thunbergia alata Bojer ex Sims
- Thunbergia amoena C.B.Clarke
- Thunbergia amphaii Suwanph., K.Khamm., D.J.Middleton & Suddee
- Thunbergia anatina Benoist
- Thunbergia angolensis S.Moore
- Thunbergia angulata Hils. & Bojer ex Hook.
- Thunbergia annua Hochst. ex Nees
- Thunbergia armipotens S.Moore
- Thunbergia arnhemica F.Muell.
- Thunbergia atacorensis Akoègn. & Lisowski
- Thunbergia atriplicifolia E.Mey. ex Nees
- Thunbergia austromontana Vollesen

== B ==
- Thunbergia bancana Bremek.
- Thunbergia barbata Vollesen
- Thunbergia batjanensis Bremek.
- Thunbergia battiscombei Turrill
- Thunbergia benguettensis Bremek.
- Thunbergia bianoensis De Wild. & Ledoux
- Thunbergia bicolor (Wight) Lindau
- Thunbergia bogoroensis De Wild.
- Thunbergia brachypoda Bremek.
- Thunbergia brachytyla Bremek.
- Thunbergia buennemeyeri Bremek.

== C ==
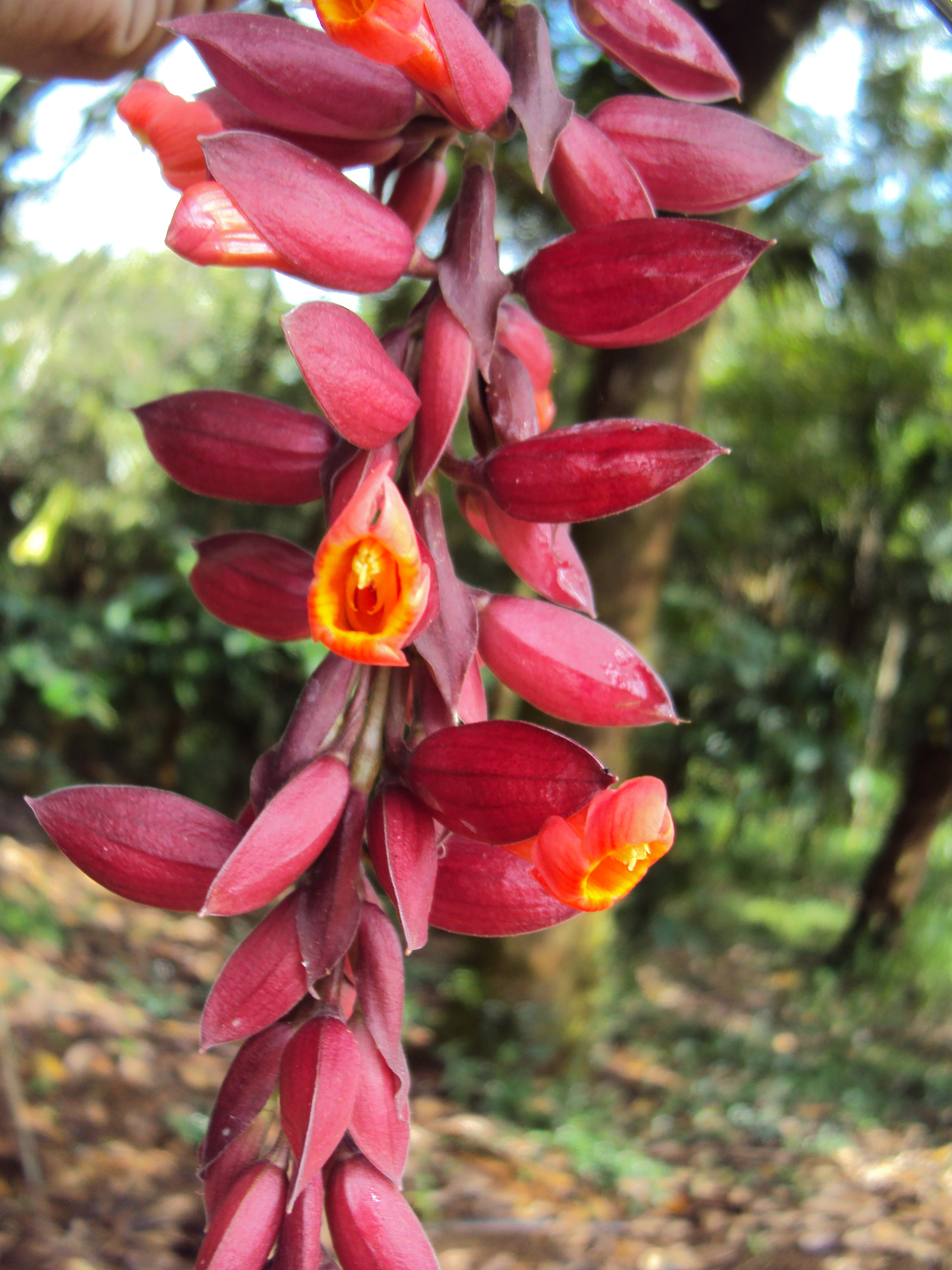
Thunbergia coccinea

- Thunbergia capensis Retz.
- Thunbergia celebica Bremek.
- Thunbergia chrysops Hook.
- Thunbergia ciliata De Wild.
- Thunbergia citrina Vollesen
- Thunbergia coccinea Wall. ex D.Don
- Thunbergia colpifera B.Hansen
- Thunbergia convolvulifolia Baker
- Thunbergia crispa Burkill
- Thunbergia crispula Bremek.
- Thunbergia cuanzensis S.Moore
- Thunbergia cyanea Bojer ex Nees
- Thunbergia cycloneura Bremek.
- Thunbergia cycnium S.Moore
- Thunbergia cynanchifolia Benth.

== D ==
- Thunbergia dasychlamys Bremek.
- Thunbergia dregeana C.Presl

== E ==
- Thunbergia eberhardtii Benoist
- Thunbergia erecta (Benth.) T.Anderson
- Thunbergia erythraeae Schweinf. ex Lindau
- Thunbergia eymae Bremek.

== F ==
- Thunbergia fasciculata Lindau
- Thunbergia fischeri Engl.
- Thunbergia fragrans Roxb.

== G ==
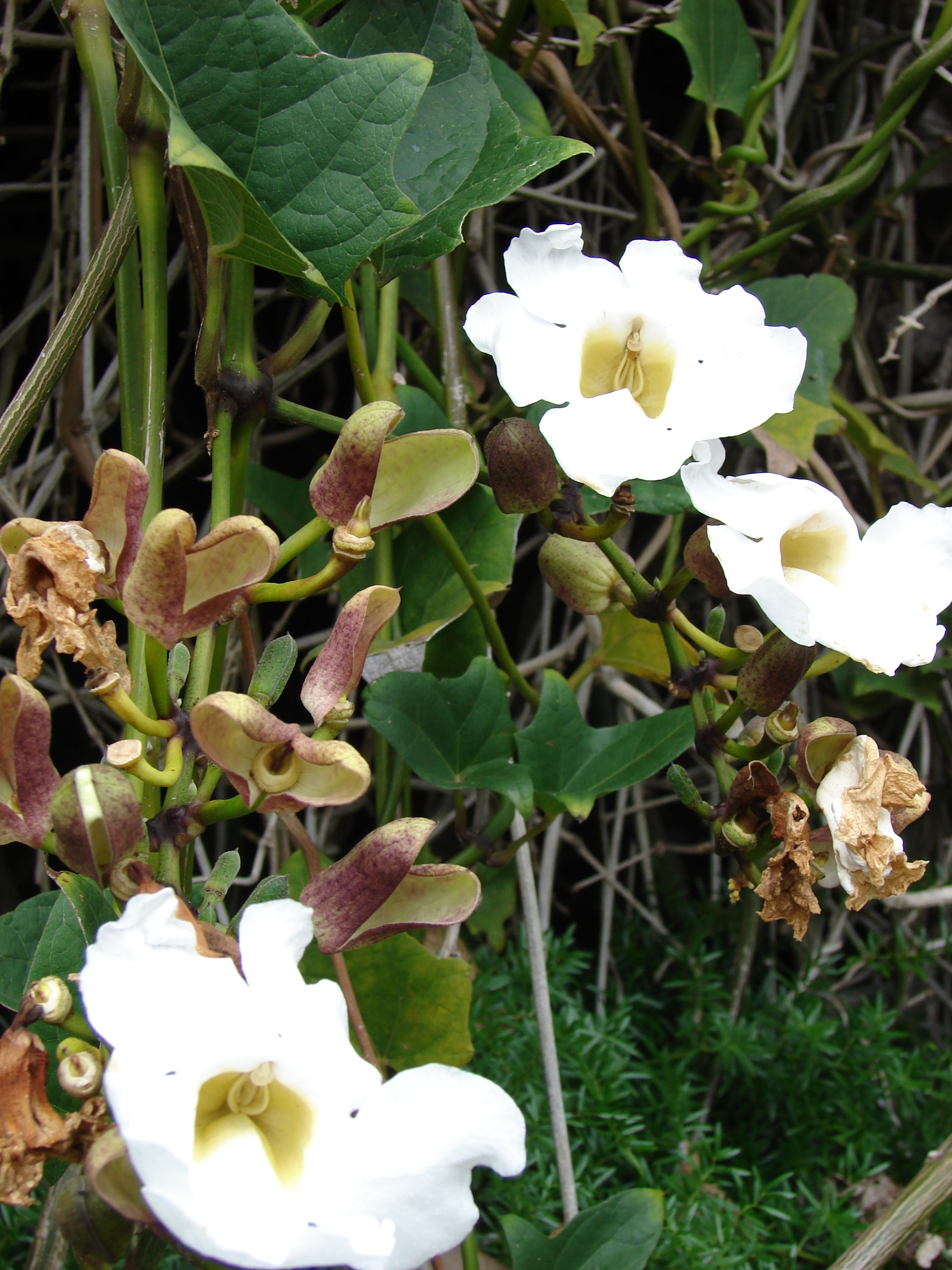
Thunbergia grandiflora

- Thunbergia geoffrayi Benoist
- Thunbergia gibsonii S.Moore
- Thunbergia gossweileri S.Moore
- Thunbergia gracilis Benoist
- Thunbergia graminifolia De Wild.
- Thunbergia grandiflora Roxb.
- Thunbergia gregorii S.Moore
- Thunbergia guerkeana Lindau

== H ==
- Thunbergia hamata Lindau ex Engl.
- Thunbergia hastata Decne.
- Thunbergia hebecocca Bremek.
- Thunbergia hederifolia Bremek.
- Thunbergia heterochondros (Mildbr.) Vollesen
- Thunbergia hirsuta T.Anderson
- Thunbergia hispida Solms
- Thunbergia holstii Lindau
- Thunbergia hossei C.B.Clarke
- Thunbergia huillensis S.Moore
- Thunbergia hyalina S.Moore

== I ==
- Thunbergia ilocana Bremek.
- Thunbergia impatienoides Suwanph. & S.Vajrodaya

== J ==
- Thunbergia javanica C.F.Gaertn.
- Thunbergia jayii S.Moore

== K ==
- Thunbergia kangeanensis Bremek.
- Thunbergia kasajuana Bh.Adhikari & J.R.I.Wood
- Thunbergia kirkiana T.Anderson
- Thunbergia kirkii Hook.f.

== L ==
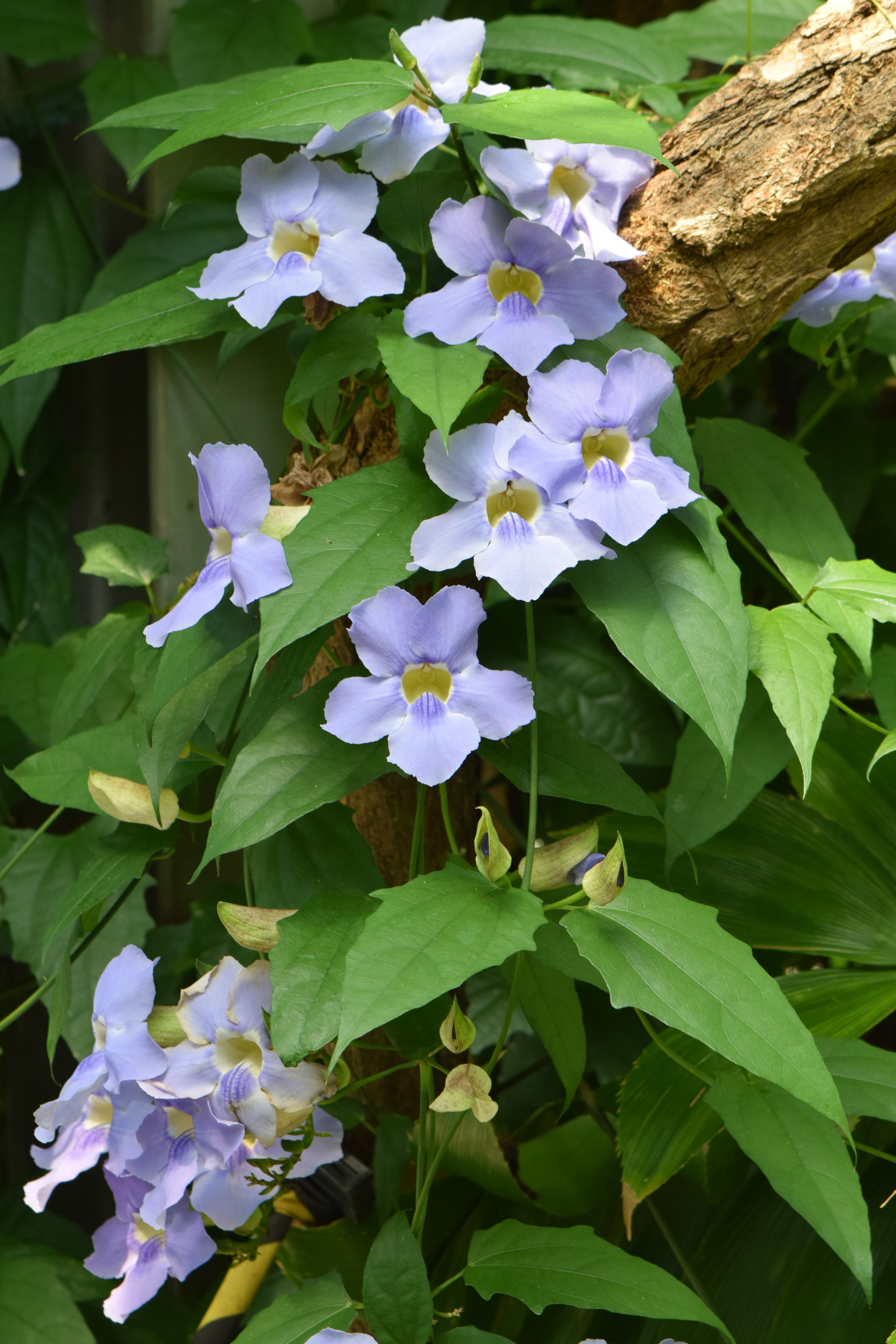
Thunbergia laurifolia

- Thunbergia laborans Burkill
- Thunbergia laevis Wall. ex Nees
- Thunbergia lamellata Hiern
- Thunbergia lancifolia T.Anderson
- Thunbergia lathyroides Burkill
- Thunbergia laurifolia Lindl.
- Thunbergia leucorhiza Benoist
- Thunbergia liebrechtsiana De Wild. & T.Durand
- Thunbergia longifolia Lindau
- Thunbergia lutea T.Anderson

== M ==
- Thunbergia macalensis Bremek.
- Thunbergia malangana Lindau
- Thunbergia masisiensis De Wild.
- Thunbergia mauginii Fiori
- Thunbergia mechowii Lindau
- Thunbergia microchlamys S.Moore
- Thunbergia mildbraediana Lebrun & L.Touss.
- Thunbergia minziroensis Vollesen
- Thunbergia mufindiensis Vollesen
- Thunbergia mysorensis (Wight) T.Anderson

== N ==
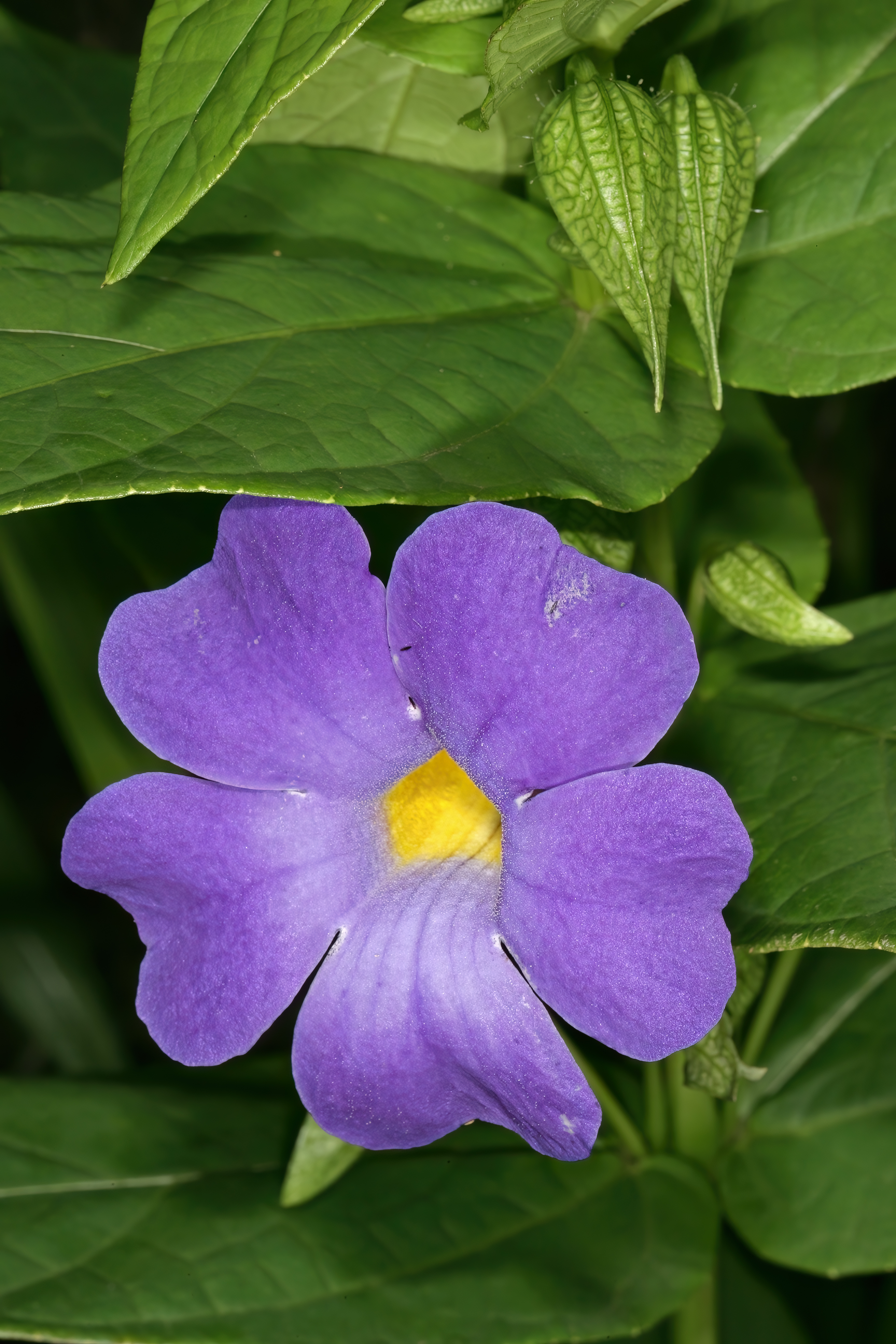
Thunbergia natalensis

- Thunbergia napperae Mwachala, Malombe & Vollesen
- Thunbergia natalensis Hook.
- Thunbergia neglecta Sond.
- Thunbergia nepalensis Bh.Adhikari & J.R.I.Wood
- Thunbergia nivea Craib

== O ==
- Thunbergia oblongifolia Oliv.
- Thunbergia oubanguiensis Benoist

== P ==
- Thunbergia palawanensis Bremek.
- Thunbergia papilionacea W.W.Sm.
- Thunbergia papuana Bremek.
- Thunbergia parviflora Bremek.
- Thunbergia parvifolia Lindau
- Thunbergia paulitschkeana Beck
- Thunbergia petersiana Lindau
- Thunbergia pleistodonta Bremek.
- Thunbergia pondoensis Lindau
- Thunbergia purpurata Harv. ex C.B.Clarke
- Thunbergia pynaertii De Wild.

== Q ==
- Thunbergia quadrialata Lindau
- Thunbergia quadricostata Bremek.

== R ==
- Thunbergia racemosa Vollesen
- Thunbergia recasa S.Moore
- Thunbergia reniformis Vollesen
- Thunbergia retefolia S.Moore
- Thunbergia reticulata Hochst. ex Nees
- Thunbergia richardsiae Vollesen
- Thunbergia ridleyi Bremek.
- Thunbergia rogersii Turrill
- Thunbergia rufescens Lindau
- Thunbergia ruspolii Lindau

== S ==
- Thunbergia schimbensis S.Moore
- Thunbergia schliebenii Vollesen
- Thunbergia schweinfurthii S.Moore
- Thunbergia serpens Vollesen
- Thunbergia sessilis Lindau
- Thunbergia siantanensis Bremek.
- Thunbergia similis Craib
- Thunbergia smilacifolia Kurz
- Thunbergia stellarioides Burkill
- Thunbergia stelligera Lindau
- Thunbergia stenochlamys Bremek.
- Thunbergia subalata Lindau
- Thunbergia subcordatifolia De Wild.

== T ==
- Thunbergia thespesiifolia Bremek.
- Thunbergia togoensis Lindau
- Thunbergia tomentosa Wall. ex Nees
- Thunbergia trachychlamys Bremek.
- Thunbergia trichocarpa Bremek.
- Thunbergia tsavoensis Vollesen

== U ==
- Thunbergia usambarica Lindau

== V ==
- Thunbergia venosa C.B.Clarke
- Thunbergia verdcourtii Vollesen
- Thunbergia vogeliana Benth.
- Thunbergia vossiana De Wild.
