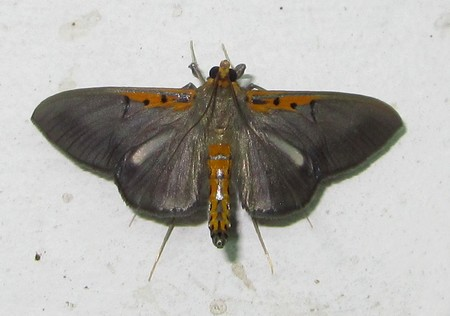
- Filodes costivitralis

Scientific classification
- Kingdom: Animalia
- Phylum: Arthropoda
- Class: Insecta
- Order: Lepidoptera
- Family: Crambidae
- Tribe: Margaroniini
- Genus: Filodes; Guenée, 1854

Synonyms
- Auxomitia Lederer, 1863

= Filodes =

Genus of moths

Filodes is a genus of moths of the family Crambidae. The genus was described by Achille Guenée in 1854.

== Species ==
- Filodes baratalis Holland, 1900
- Filodes bilinealis Hampson, 1908
- Filodes cocytusalis Walker, 1859
- Filodes costivitralis Guenée, 1862
- Filodes decoloralis Snellen, 1899
- Filodes fulvibasalis Hampson, 1898
- Filodes fulvidorsalis Hübner, 1832
- Filodes malgassalis Mabille, 1900
- Filodes mirificalis Lederer, 1863
- Filodes normalis Hampson, 1912
- Filodes obscuralis Strand, 1920
- Filodes patruelis Moore, 1888
- Filodes sexpunctalis Snellen, 1890
- Filodes tenuimarginalis Hampson, 1918
- Filodes xanthalis Hampson, 1898

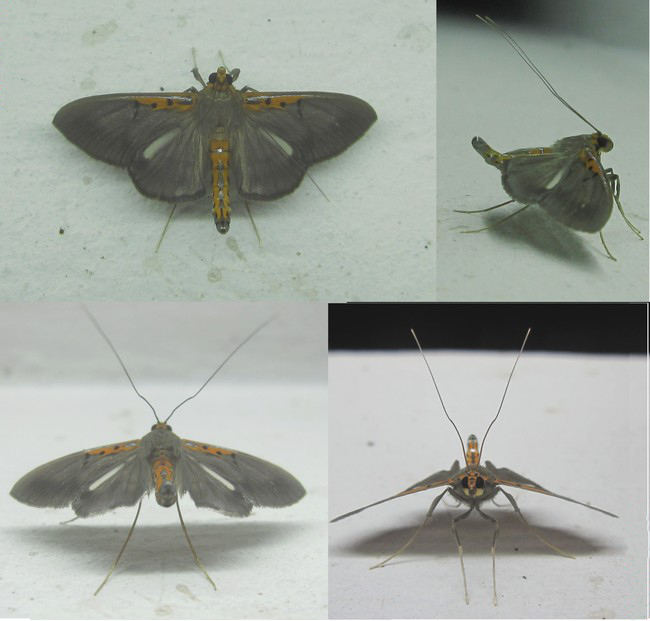
Filodes costivitralis

== Former species ==
- Filodes abnormalis Plötz, 1880
- Filodes adustalis Ghesquière, 1942
- Filodes alboterminalis Kenrick, 1917
