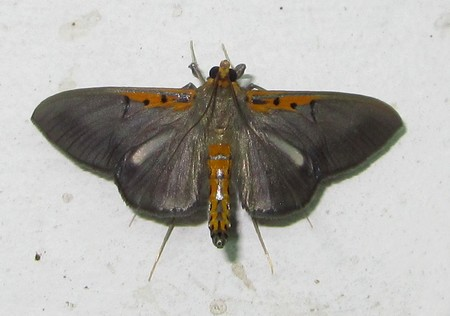

Scientific classification
- Kingdom: Animalia
- Phylum: Arthropoda
- Class: Insecta
- Order: Lepidoptera
- Family: Crambidae
- Genus: Filodes
- Species: F. costivitralis

Binomial name
- Filodes costivitralis Guenée, 1862

Synonyms
- Filodes productalis Hampson, 1898; Filodes costiventralis

= Filodes costivitralis =

Species of moth

Filodes costivitralis, the window pearl, is a moth of the family Crambidae. It is found in Réunion, Madagascar, Mauritius, and central, southern and eastern Africa.

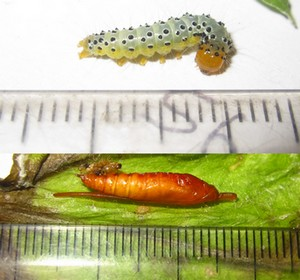
Filodes costivitralis larvae

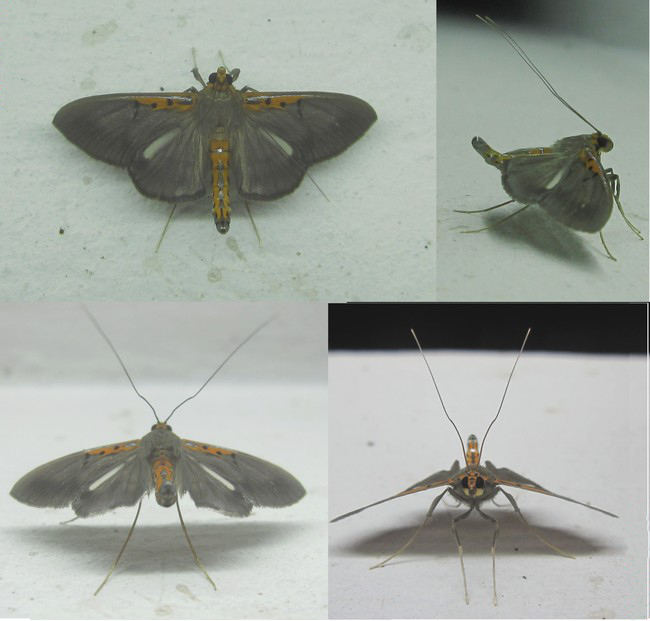

The larvae feed on Hibiscus species and Thunbergia species, including Thunbergia grandiflora.

Occasionally the adults drink tear liquid from cattle, and can be a vector of animal diseases.
