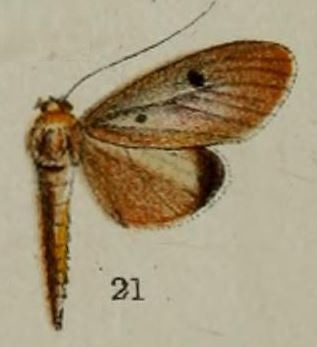
- Phryganodes biguttata

Scientific classification
- Kingdom: Animalia
- Phylum: Arthropoda
- Class: Insecta
- Order: Lepidoptera
- Family: Crambidae
- Tribe: Agroterini
- Genus: Phryganodes; Guenée, 1854

Synonyms
- Phyganodes Dognin, 1907

= Phryganodes =

Genus of moths

Phryganodes is a genus of moths of the family Crambidae described by Achille Guenée in 1854.

== Species ==
- Phryganodes albipedalis Hampson, 1899
- Phryganodes antongilensis (Mabille, 1900)
- Phryganodes attenuata Hampson, 1899
- Phryganodes biguttata Hampson, 1898
- Phryganodes centralbalis Hampson, 1899
- Phryganodes chrysalis Hampson, 1908
- Phryganodes cupriflavalis Hampson, 1912
- Phryganodes eradicalis Hampson, 1908
- Phryganodes erebusalis (Hampson, 1898)
- Phryganodes flocculentalis Hampson, 1899
- Phryganodes hamiferalis Hampson, 1899
- Phryganodes lanialis Hampson, 1899
- Phryganodes lasiocnemis Hampson, 1912
- Phryganodes leucogaster Hampson, 1912
- Phryganodes lophophoralis Hampson, 1896
- Phryganodes nesusalis (Walker, 1859)
- Phryganodes pachycraspedalis Hampson, 1896
- Phryganodes plicatalis Guenée, 1854
- Phryganodes selenalis Caradja in Caradja & Meyrick, 1933
- Phryganodes setifera Hampson, 1899
- Phryganodes stygialis Hampson, 1912
- Phryganodes tagiadalis Hampson, 1899
- Phryganodes tetraplagalis Hampson, 1899
- Phryganodes unitalis (Guenée, 1854)
- Phryganodes unitinctalis Hampson, 1896
- Phryganodes violitincta Rothschild, 1915

=== Former species ===
- Phryganodes baratalis Holland, 1900 transferred to Filodes baratalis (Holland, 1900)
- Phryganodes bistigmalis Strand, 1913 transferred to Phostria bistigmalis (Strand, 1913)
