= T. erecta =

T. erecta may refer to:

- Tagetes erecta, the Mexican marigold, a plant species native to Mexico and Central America
- Thunbergia erecta, a plant species native to western Africa

== See also ==
- Erecta
