= Filodes fulvibasalis =

Scientific classification
- Kingdom: Animalia
- Phylum: Arthropoda
- Class: Insecta
- Order: Lepidoptera
- Family: Crambidae
- Genus: Filodes
- Species: F. fulvibasalis

Binomial name
- Filodes fulvibasalis Hampson, 1898

Species of moth

Filodes fulvibasalis is a moth in the family Crambidae, first described by George Hampson in 1898. It is found on the Tanimbar Islands in Indonesia and in Queensland in Australia.

The wingspan is about 32 mm.
