= Filodes mirificalis =

Scientific classification
- Kingdom: Animalia
- Phylum: Arthropoda
- Class: Insecta
- Order: Lepidoptera
- Family: Crambidae
- Genus: Filodes
- Species: F. mirificalis

Binomial name
- Filodes mirificalis (Lederer, 1863)

Synonyms
- Auxomitia mirificalis Lederer, 1863

Species of moth

Filodes mirificalis is a moth in the family Crambidae. It was described by Julius Lederer in 1863. It is found in India, where it has been recorded from the Nicobar Islands.
