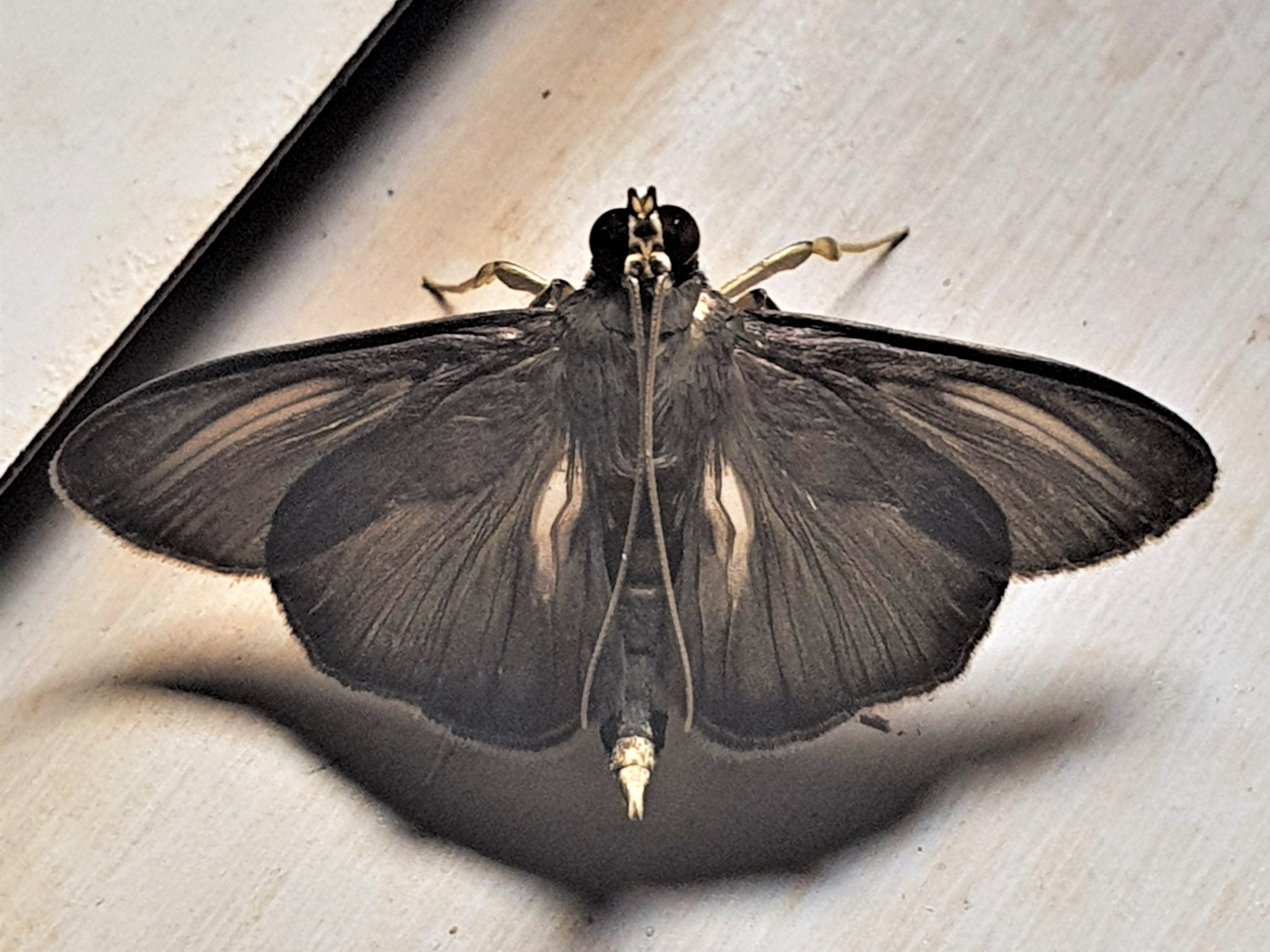

Scientific classification
- Kingdom: Animalia
- Phylum: Arthropoda
- Class: Insecta
- Order: Lepidoptera
- Family: Crambidae
- Genus: Phryganodes
- Species: P. plicatalis

Binomial name
- Phryganodes plicatalis Guenée, 1854

= Phryganodes plicatalis =

Species of moth

Phryganodes plicatalis is a species of moth in the family Crambidae. It was described by Achille Guenée in 1854. It is found in French Guiana.
