= Filodes decoloralis =

Scientific classification
- Kingdom: Animalia
- Phylum: Arthropoda
- Class: Insecta
- Order: Lepidoptera
- Family: Crambidae
- Genus: Filodes
- Species: F. decoloralis

Binomial name
- Filodes decoloralis Snellen, 1899

Species of moth

Filodes decoloralis is a moth in the family Crambidae. It was described by Snellen in 1899. It is found on Sumatra.
