= Phryganodes erebusalis =

Scientific classification
- Kingdom: Animalia
- Phylum: Arthropoda
- Class: Insecta
- Order: Lepidoptera
- Family: Crambidae
- Genus: Phryganodes
- Species: P. erebusalis

Binomial name
- Phryganodes erebusalis Hampson, 1898

Species of moth

Phryganodes erebusalis is a species of moth in the family Crambidae. It was described by George Hampson in 1898. It is found in Equatorial Guinea and Sierra Leone.
