= Filodes normalis =

Scientific classification
- Kingdom: Animalia
- Phylum: Arthropoda
- Class: Insecta
- Order: Lepidoptera
- Family: Crambidae
- Genus: Filodes
- Species: F. normalis

Binomial name
- Filodes normalis Hampson, 1912

Species of moth

Filodes normalis is a moth in the family Crambidae. It was described by George Hampson in 1912. It is found in Cameroon, Ghana and Nigeria.
