= Phryganodes cupriflavalis =

Scientific classification
- Kingdom: Animalia
- Phylum: Arthropoda
- Class: Insecta
- Order: Lepidoptera
- Family: Crambidae
- Genus: Phryganodes
- Species: P. cupriflavalis

Binomial name
- Phryganodes cupriflavalis Hampson, 1912

Species of moth

Phryganodes cupriflavalis is a species of moth in the family Crambidae. It was described by George Hampson in 1912. It is found in Singapore.
