= Phryganodes tetraplagalis =

Scientific classification
- Kingdom: Animalia
- Phylum: Arthropoda
- Class: Insecta
- Order: Lepidoptera
- Family: Crambidae
- Genus: Phryganodes
- Species: P. tetraplagalis

Binomial name
- Phryganodes tetraplagalis Hampson, 1899

Species of moth

Phryganodes tetraplagalis is a species of moth in the family Crambidae. It was described by George Hampson in 1899. It is found in Western New Guinea in Indonesia and in Papua New Guinea, where it has been recorded from the D'Entrecasteaux Islands (Fergusson Island).
