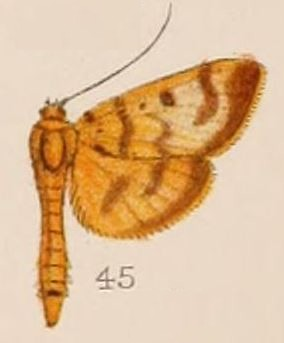

Scientific classification
- Kingdom: Animalia
- Phylum: Arthropoda
- Class: Insecta
- Order: Lepidoptera
- Family: Crambidae
- Genus: Phryganodes
- Species: P. chrysalis

Binomial name
- Phryganodes chrysalis Hampson, 1908

Synonyms
- Phostria chrysalis (Hampson, 1908)

= Phryganodes chrysalis =

Species of moth

Phryganodes chrysalis is a species of moth in the family Crambidae. It was described by George Hampson in 1908. It is found in Sri Lanka.
