= Phryganodes unitalis =

Scientific classification
- Kingdom: Animalia
- Phylum: Arthropoda
- Class: Insecta
- Order: Lepidoptera
- Family: Crambidae
- Genus: Phryganodes
- Species: P. unitalis

Binomial name
- Phryganodes unitalis (Guenée, 1854)

Synonyms
- Botys unitalis Guenée, 1854; Pachynoa opalinalis Moore, 1877; Phryganodes griseopalizans Rothschild, 1915

Species of moth

Phryganodes unitalis is a species of moth in the family Crambidae. It was described by Achille Guenée in 1854. It is found in Bangladesh, mainland India and the Andaman Islands and Papua New Guinea.
