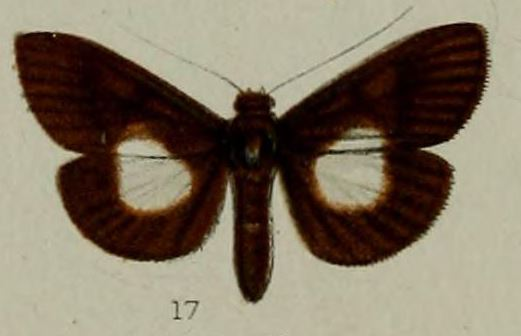

Scientific classification
- Kingdom: Animalia
- Phylum: Arthropoda
- Class: Insecta
- Order: Lepidoptera
- Family: Crambidae
- Genus: Phryganodes
- Species: P. centralbalis

Binomial name
- Phryganodes centralbalis Hampson, 1899

Synonyms
- Phostria centralbalis (Hampson, 1898)

= Phryganodes centralbalis =

Species of moth

Phryganodes centralbalis is a species of moth in the family Crambidae. It was described by George Hampson in 1899. It is found in Papua New Guinea, where it has been recorded from the D'Entrecasteaux Islands (Fergusson Island).
