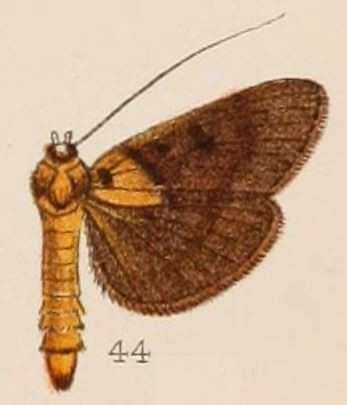

Scientific classification
- Kingdom: Animalia
- Phylum: Arthropoda
- Class: Insecta
- Order: Lepidoptera
- Family: Crambidae
- Genus: Filodes
- Species: F. bilinealis

Binomial name
- Filodes bilinealis Hampson, 1908

= Filodes bilinealis =

Species of moth

Filodes bilinealis is a moth of the family Crambidae described by George Hampson in 1908. It is found in Sri Lanka.

This species has a wingspan of 38 mm.
