= Phryganodes eradicalis =

Scientific classification
- Kingdom: Animalia
- Phylum: Arthropoda
- Class: Insecta
- Order: Lepidoptera
- Family: Crambidae
- Genus: Phryganodes
- Species: P. eradicalis

Binomial name
- Phryganodes eradicalis Hampson, 1908

Species of moth

Phryganodes eradicalis is a species of moth in the family Crambidae. It was described by George Hampson in 1908. It is found on the Andaman Islands in Indonesia and in Singapore.
