= Filodes xanthalis =

Scientific classification
- Kingdom: Animalia
- Phylum: Arthropoda
- Class: Insecta
- Order: Lepidoptera
- Family: Crambidae
- Genus: Filodes
- Species: F. xanthalis

Binomial name
- Filodes xanthalis Hampson, 1898

Species of moth

Filodes xanthalis is a moth in the family Crambidae. It was described by George Hampson in 1898. It is found on New Guinea (Papua New Guinea, D'Entrecasteaux Islands, Trobriand Islands).

The wingspan is about 40 mm. The forewings are orange yellow with a fuscous costal area. The terminal area is fuscous from two-thirds of the costa to the inner margin near the tornus. The hindwings have a terminal fuscous line.
