= Filodes tenuimarginalis =

Scientific classification
- Kingdom: Animalia
- Phylum: Arthropoda
- Class: Insecta
- Order: Lepidoptera
- Family: Crambidae
- Genus: Filodes
- Species: F. tenuimarginalis

Binomial name
- Filodes tenuimarginalis Hampson, 1918

Species of moth

Filodes tenuimarginalis is a moth in the family Crambidae. It was described by George Hampson in 1918. It is found on Sulawesi.
