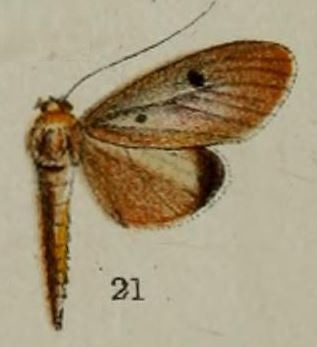

Scientific classification
- Kingdom: Animalia
- Phylum: Arthropoda
- Clade: Pancrustacea
- Class: Insecta
- Order: Lepidoptera
- Family: Crambidae
- Genus: Phryganodes
- Species: P. biguttata

Binomial name
- Phryganodes biguttata Hampson, 1899

= Phryganodes biguttata =

Species of moth

Phryganodes biguttata is a species of moth in the family Crambidae that is found in the Democratic Republic of the Congo, Cameroon and Sierra Leone. The species was first described by George Hampson in 1899.
