= Phryganodes tagiadalis =

Scientific classification
- Kingdom: Animalia
- Phylum: Arthropoda
- Class: Insecta
- Order: Lepidoptera
- Family: Crambidae
- Genus: Phryganodes
- Species: P. tagiadalis

Binomial name
- Phryganodes tagiadalis Hampson, 1899

Species of moth

Phryganodes tagiadalis is a species of moth in the family Crambidae. It was described by George Hampson in 1899. It is found in Papua New Guinea, where it has been recorded from the D'Entrecasteaux Islands (Fergusson Island).

== Description ==
Phryganodes tagiadalis is a mostly black-brown moth with a slight purplish gloss. However, some parts are not black-brown, but rather white. These are the legs, belly (called a ventral), frons (part of the forehead), underside of hind wing, and genital tufts on the males.
