= Filodes malgassalis =

Scientific classification
- Kingdom: Animalia
- Phylum: Arthropoda
- Class: Insecta
- Order: Lepidoptera
- Family: Crambidae
- Genus: Filodes
- Species: F. malgassalis

Binomial name
- Filodes malgassalis (Mabille, 1900)

Synonyms
- Glyphodes malgassalis Mabille, 1900

Species of moth

Filodes malgassalis is a moth in the family Crambidae. It was described by Paul Mabille in 1900. It is found on Madagascar.
