= Filodes cocytusalis =

Scientific classification
- Kingdom: Animalia
- Phylum: Arthropoda
- Class: Insecta
- Order: Lepidoptera
- Family: Crambidae
- Genus: Filodes
- Species: F. cocytusalis

Binomial name
- Filodes cocytusalis (Walker, 1859)

Synonyms
- Euglyphis cocytusalis Walker, 1859; Phryganodes abnormalis Plötz, 1880; Filodes abnormalis; Filodes adustalis Ghesquière, 1942

Species of moth

Filodes cocytusalis is a moth in the family Crambidae. It was described by Francis Walker in 1859. It is found in Cameroon, the Democratic Republic of the Congo, Ghana, Réunion, Sierra Leone and Tanzania.
