= Filodes sexpunctalis =

Scientific classification
- Kingdom: Animalia
- Phylum: Arthropoda
- Class: Insecta
- Order: Lepidoptera
- Family: Crambidae
- Genus: Filodes
- Species: F. sexpunctalis

Binomial name
- Filodes sexpunctalis Snellen, 1890

Species of moth

Filodes sexpunctalis is a moth in the family Crambidae. It was described by Snellen in 1890. It is found in India (Darjeeling).
