= Phryganodes antongilensis =

Scientific classification
- Kingdom: Animalia
- Phylum: Arthropoda
- Class: Insecta
- Order: Lepidoptera
- Family: Crambidae
- Genus: Phryganodes
- Species: P. antongilensis

Binomial name
- Phryganodes antongilensis Mabille, 1900

Species of moth

Phryganodes antongilensis is a species of moth in the family Crambidae. It was described by Paul Mabille in 1900. It is found on Madagascar.
