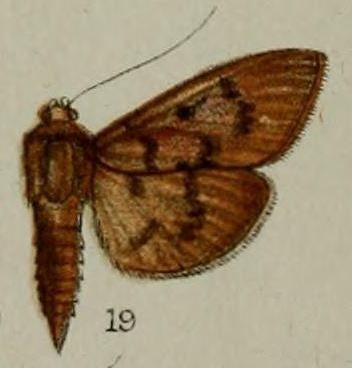

Scientific classification
- Kingdom: Animalia
- Phylum: Arthropoda
- Class: Insecta
- Order: Lepidoptera
- Family: Crambidae
- Genus: Phryganodes
- Species: P. lanialis

Binomial name
- Phryganodes lanialis Hampson, 1899

Synonyms
- Phostria lanialis (Hampson, 1898)

= Phryganodes lanialis =

Species of moth

Phryganodes lanialis is a species of moth in the family Crambidae. It was described by George Hampson in 1899. It is found in Papua New Guinea, where it has been recorded from the D'Entrecasteaux Islands (Fergusson Island).
