= Filodes obscuralis =

Scientific classification
- Kingdom: Animalia
- Phylum: Arthropoda
- Class: Insecta
- Order: Lepidoptera
- Family: Crambidae
- Genus: Filodes
- Species: F. obscuralis

Binomial name
- Filodes obscuralis Strand, 1920

Species of moth

Filodes obscuralis is a moth in the family Crambidae. It was described by Embrik Strand in 1912, as being mostly matte black with a clay-yellow abdomen and having a whitish stripe down its forewings. It is found in Cameroon.
