= Phryganodes lophophoralis =

Scientific classification
- Kingdom: Animalia
- Phylum: Arthropoda
- Class: Insecta
- Order: Lepidoptera
- Family: Crambidae
- Genus: Phryganodes
- Species: P. lophophoralis

Binomial name
- Phryganodes lophophoralis Hampson, 1896

Species of moth

Phryganodes lophophoralis is a species of moth in the family Crambidae. It was described by George Hampson in 1896. It is found in Sikkim, India.
