= Phryganodes selenalis =

Scientific classification
- Kingdom: Animalia
- Phylum: Arthropoda
- Clade: Pancrustacea
- Class: Insecta
- Order: Lepidoptera
- Family: Crambidae
- Genus: Phryganodes
- Species: P. selenalis

Binomial name
- Phryganodes selenalis Caradja in Caradja & Meyrick, 1933

Species of moth

Phryganodes selenalis is a species of moth in the family Crambidae. It was described by Aristide Caradja in 1933. It is found in Guangdong, China.
