= Phryganodes albipedalis =

Scientific classification
- Kingdom: Animalia
- Phylum: Arthropoda
- Class: Insecta
- Order: Lepidoptera
- Family: Crambidae
- Genus: Phryganodes
- Species: P. albipedalis

Binomial name
- Phryganodes albipedalis Hampson, 1899

Species of moth

Phryganodes albipedalis is a species of moth in the family Crambidae. It was described by George Hampson in 1899. It is found in Indonesia's Sangihe Islands.
