= Phryganodes nesusalis =

Scientific classification
- Kingdom: Animalia
- Phylum: Arthropoda
- Class: Insecta
- Order: Lepidoptera
- Family: Crambidae
- Genus: Phryganodes
- Species: P. nesusalis

Binomial name
- Phryganodes nesusalis (Walker, 1859)

Synonyms
- Botys nesusalis Walker, 1859

Species of moth

Phryganodes nesusalis is a species of moth in the family Crambidae. It was described by Francis Walker in 1859. It is found in Angola and Sierra Leone.
