= Filodes patruelis =

Scientific classification
- Kingdom: Animalia
- Phylum: Arthropoda
- Class: Insecta
- Order: Lepidoptera
- Family: Crambidae
- Genus: Filodes
- Species: F. patruelis

Binomial name
- Filodes patruelis Moore, 1888

Species of moth

Filodes patruelis is a moth in the family Crambidae. It was described by Frederic Moore in 1888. It is found in India.
