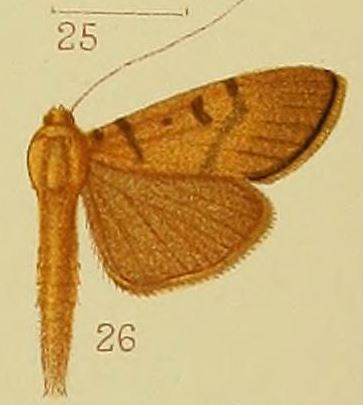

Scientific classification
- Domain: Eukaryota
- Kingdom: Animalia
- Phylum: Arthropoda
- Class: Insecta
- Order: Lepidoptera
- Family: Crambidae
- Genus: Syllepte
- Species: S. glebalis

Binomial name
- Syllepte glebalis (Lederer, 1863)

Synonyms
- Botys glebalis Lederer, 1863; Filodes alboterminalis Kenrick, 1917; Sylepta megastigmalis Hampson, 1899; Syllepte percnospila Meyrick, 1933

= Syllepte glebalis =

Species of moth

Syllepte glebalis is a moth in the family Crambidae. It was described by Julius Lederer in 1863. It is found in Cameroon, the Democratic Republic of the Congo (Orientale, North Kivu, Equateur, East Kasai), Ivory Coast, Madagascar, Nigeria, Sierra Leone, Zambia and Zimbabwe.
