= Filodes baratalis =

Scientific classification
- Kingdom: Animalia
- Phylum: Arthropoda
- Class: Insecta
- Order: Lepidoptera
- Family: Crambidae
- Genus: Filodes
- Species: F. baratalis

Binomial name
- Filodes baratalis (Holland, 1900)

Synonyms
- Phryganodes baratalis Holland, 1900

Species of moth

Filodes baratalis is a moth in the family Crambidae. It was described by William Jacob Holland in 1900. It is found on Buru in Indonesia.
