= Thunbergia reticulata =

Scientific classification
- Kingdom: Plantae
- Clade: Tracheophytes
- Clade: Angiosperms
- Clade: Eudicots
- Clade: Asterids
- Order: Lamiales
- Family: Acanthaceae
- Genus: Thunbergia
- Species: T. reticulata

Binomial name
- Thunbergia reticulata Hochst. ex Nees

Species of plant

Thunbergia reticulata is a species of flowering plant within the family Acanthaceae.

== Description ==
Thunbergia reticulata is an annual plant. Its stems can grow up to 40 cm in length in erect plants, or up to 1.5 meters long in creeping or twining forms. The leaves are opposite, triangular-ovate to cordate in shape, and often exhibit hastate lobes at the base. They are typically sparsely hairy, particularly on the veins beneath, with margins that are either entire or coarsely toothed. The petiole ranges from 1 to 5.5 cm in length and is narrowly to broadly winged. The flowers are axillary and typically solitary, though sometimes paired. The bracteoles are green with prominent brownish to purple veins, ovate in shape, and measure 1.7–2.5 cm in length, with a cordate base and distinct 4-angled corners. The corolla of the flower is white, cream, or orange and lacks a purple throat. The fruit is a depressed, beaked, globose capsule ranging from 10–15 mm long and is densely covered in fine velvety hairs.

== Distribution ==
Thunbergia reticulata is distributed across several countries in Africa, including: Botswana, Eritrea, Ethiopia, Kenya, Namibia, Sudan, Zambia, and Zimbabwe. The species has also been introduced into Malaysia.

== Habitat ==
Thunbergia reticulata grows in sandy well drained soils, in tropical climates. It utilizes a variety of habitat including woodland and grassland, but can also be found growing amongst large boulders. The species has been recorded at altitudes ranging from 900 to 1410 meters above sea level.
