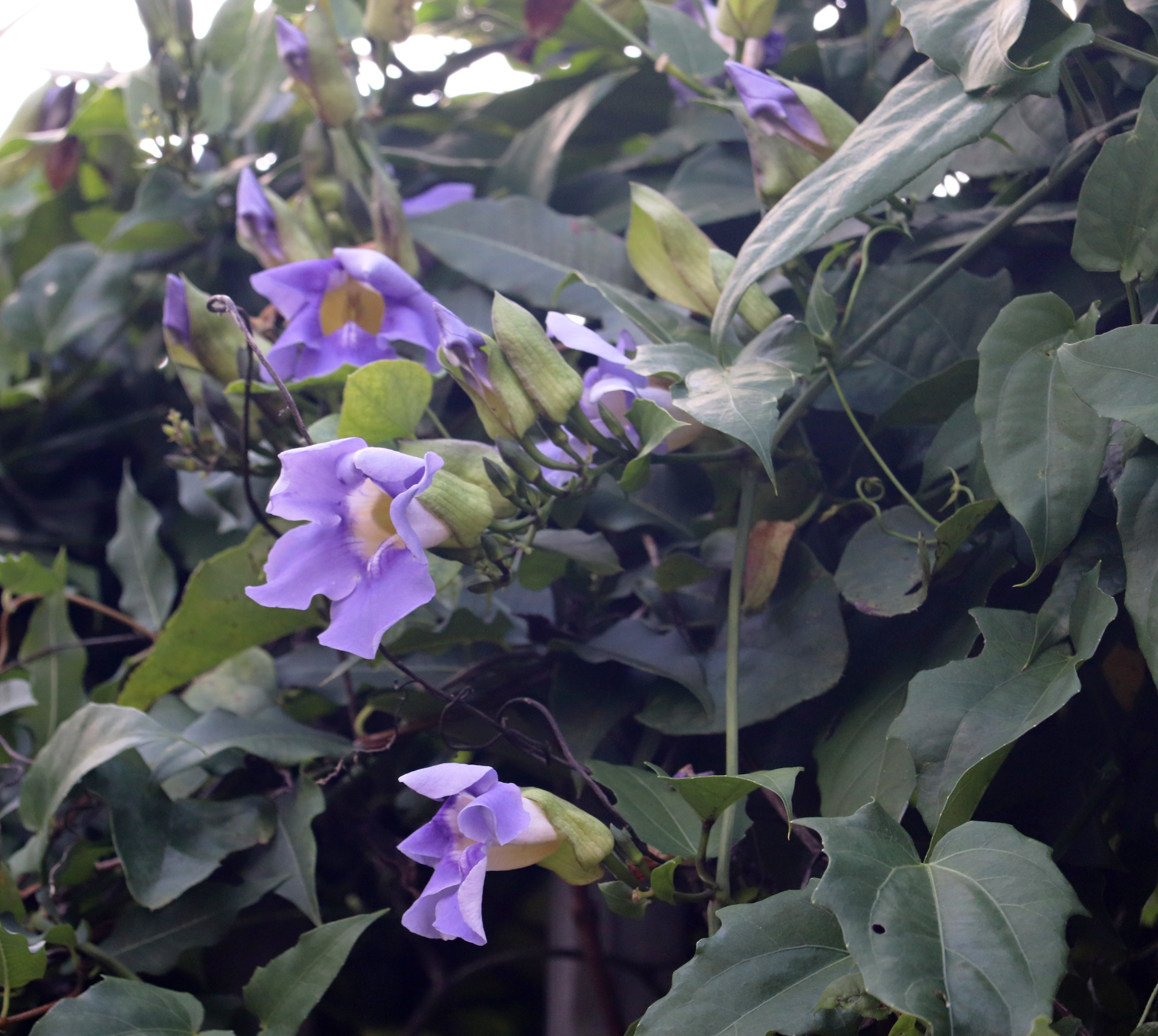

Scientific classification
- Kingdom: Plantae
- Clade: Embryophytes
- Clade: Tracheophytes
- Clade: Spermatophytes
- Clade: Angiosperms
- Clade: Eudicots
- Clade: Asterids
- Order: Lamiales
- Family: Acanthaceae
- Genus: Thunbergia
- Species: T. grandiflora

Binomial name
- Thunbergia grandiflora (Roxb. ex Rottler) Roxb.

Synonyms
- List: Flemingia grandiflora Roxb. ex Rottler, 1803; Thunbergia adenophora W.W.Sm., 1917; Thunbergia chinensis Merr., 1922; Thunbergia clarkei T.Yamaz., 1971; Thunbergia cordifolia Nees, 1847; Thunbergia grandiflora f. alba Leonard, 1958; Thunbergia grandiflora var. axillaris C.B.Clarke, 1884; Thunbergia grandiflora f. citrina Leonard, 1958; Thunbergia grandiflora var. cordiflora Benoist, 1935; Thunbergia grandiflora var. racemosa Nees, 1847; Thunbergia lacei Gamble, 1913; Thunbergia malvifolia Buch.-Ham. ex Wall., 1829; Thunbergia talbotiae S.Moore, 1914

= Thunbergia grandiflora =

Species of flowering plant

Thunbergia grandiflora is an evergreen vine in the family Acanthaceae. It is native to southeast Asia, particularly Indochina, and is widely naturalised elsewhere. Common names include Bengal clockvine, Bengal trumpet, blue skyflower, blue thunbergia, blue trumpetvine, clockvine, skyflower and skyvine. The specific epithet grandiflora means "large-flowered".

== Description ==
Plants may grow to about 20 metres in height and have a long root system with a deep tap root, that can be as large as a small car. The stems are green, pubescent and quadrangular when young, becoming brown, rounded and woody with age.

The leaves are arranged in opposite pairs and borne on stalks up to 10 cm (3.9 in) long. They are bright green when young, becoming dark green with age and paler beneath, with a rough upper surface. The leaf blades are highly variable in shape, ranging from ovate and cordate to triangular or angularly lobed, and measure up to 22 cm (8.7 in) long and 15 cm (5.9 in) wide, although they are typically smaller than those of the closely related T. laurifolia. The leaves have an acute apex, prominently raised veins, with three to five primary veins arising from the base, and margins that may be entire, toothed or lobed.

=== Flowers ===
The large, showy, trumpet-shaped flowers are borne in pendulous clusters and are up to 8 cm (3.1 in) long and 6 to 8 cm (2.4 to 3.1 in) wide. The corolla has five rounded lobes, one longer than the others, and is typically pale blue, violet or mauve with a pale yellow to whitish throat and a white exterior. Flowers are borne on 4 to 5 cm long pedicels and are subtended by a pair of leafy bracteoles, which are oblong to ovate, 15 to 40 mm long and 10 to 20 mm wide, with acuminate apices. The pubescent sepals are fused to form a greenish, ring-like calyx tube that is sometimes streaked with purple or red. Flowering may occur throughout the year but is most prolific during summer and autumn.

The fruit is a brown, oval capsule about 3 cm (1.2 in) long with a long, pointed beak, containing two to four seeds. These are followed by pods containing seeds that are ejected several metres upon ripening. Plants also reproduce from segments that are washed down watercourses.

== Cultivation ==
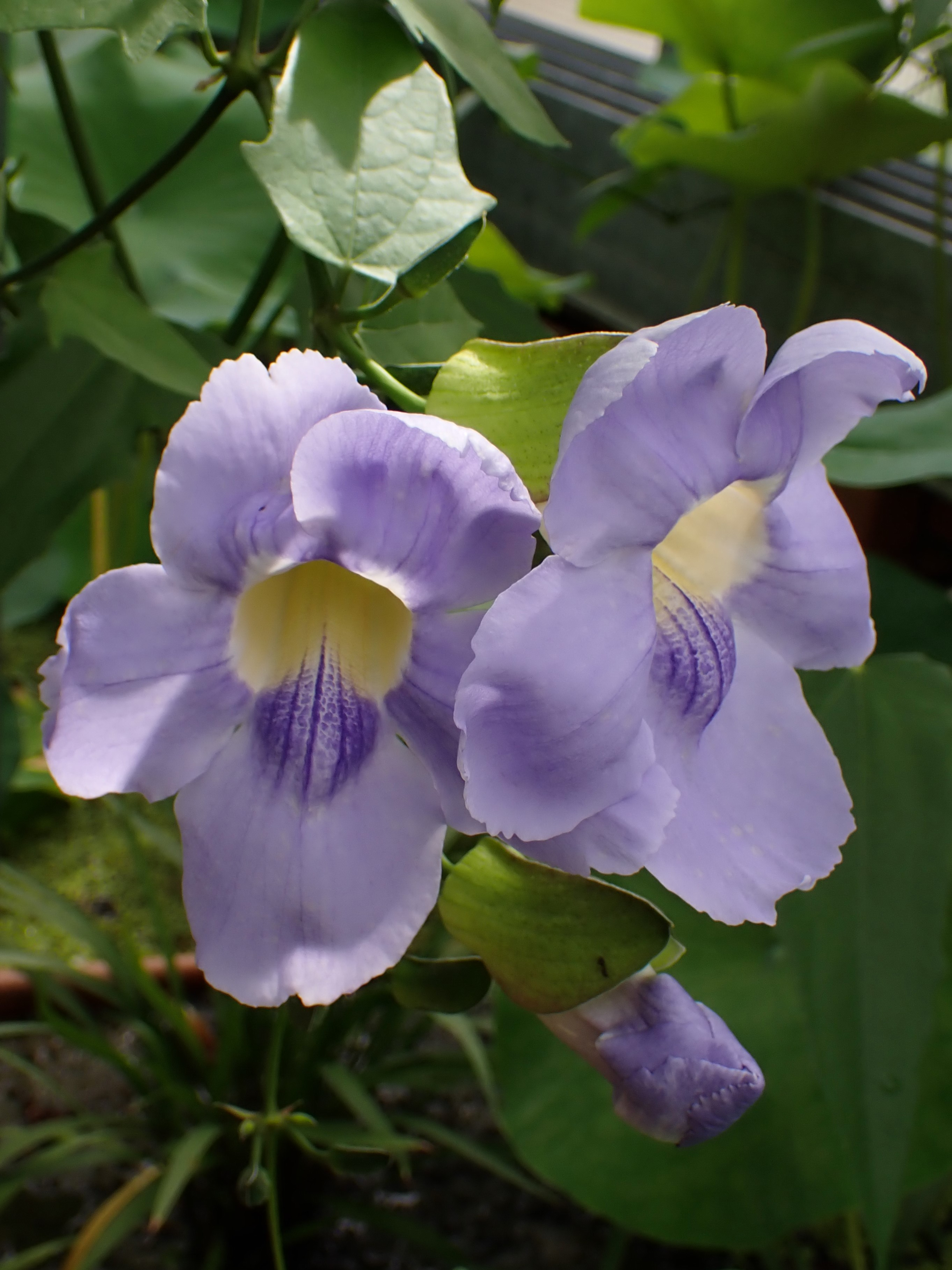
Flowers

With a minimum temperature of 10–13 °C (50–55 °F), this plant is cultivated as a houseplant in temperate regions, and has gained the Royal Horticultural Society's Award of Garden Merit.

It is hardy in USDA hardiness zones 10 and 11, where it grows best in fertile, organically rich, moist but well-drained soils in full sun to partial shade. In hotter climates, it benefits from light afternoon shade. In cooler regions, it is commonly cultivated as an annual or overwintered indoors in containers. The species is propagated from seed, cuttings or overwintered container-grown plants. The species readily regenerates from its expansive tuberous root system. Shoots arising from the tubers are easily separated and transplanted, making vegetative propagation simpler and more reliable than growing plants from seed or stem cuttings. The species is generally free of serious insect pests and diseases, although it may be susceptible to scale insects, spider mites and whiteflies.

== Distribution ==
The plant is native to Assam, Bangladesh, Bhutan, Cambodia, South-Central China and Southeast China (Fujian Sheng, Guangdong Sheng, Guangxi Zhuangzu Zizhiqu, Hainan Sheng), East Himalaya, Laos, Peninsular Malaysia, Myanmar, Nepal, Northeast India, Thailand and Vietnam.

It is widely naturalised in the coastal regions of Queensland, where it is most common in the Cook pastoral district. Scattered populations also occur along the central and south-eastern Queensland coast. Outside Australia, the species has become naturalised in parts of South America (Guyana, Ecuador, Suriname), Singapore, Central America (including Costa Rica), the southeastern United States (particularly Florida), the Mascarene Islands (including Réunion, Mauritius and the Seychelles), and several Pacific Islands, including Fiji, Samoa, Palau and Hawaii. It is an adventive plant in Mexico (Chiapas) and Guatemala.

=== Weed status ===
The species has become a serious environmental weed in Australia on disturbed land along watercourses and in the wet tropics where it smothers other vegetation. It is commonly seen north of Sydney where it has been cultivated for many years. It thrives in tropical, subtropical and even warmer temperate regions, preferring frostless areas with productive, acidic, permeable soils. It is commonly established in riversides, in forests (particularly along its boundaries and disturbed areas), in sparse timberlands, and along roadsides and fence lines.

It develops an extensive tuberous root system, with individual tubers weighing up to 70 kg (150 lb). The tubers readily resprout from numerous dormant buds following cutting or pruning, making the species difficult to eradicate. The root system can damage riverbanks, footpaths, fences and building foundations. As a vigorous climber, the plant can smother vegetation up to 12 m (39 ft) above ground, reducing light availability to the understorey and, in severe infestations, killing trees under the weight of its stems. Although it is not considered a major weed in parts of its native range, including Kenya, Tanzania and Uganda, it is a significant invasive species in Australia, where it invades agricultural land and nature reserves, forming dense infestations that can achieve complete groundcover and displace native vegetation.

== Ethnobotany and pharmacology ==
In traditional medicine, Thunbergia grandiflora has been used to treat a variety of ailments, including dysentery, cataracts, diabetes, gout, hydrocele, malaria, rheumatism, conjunctivitis, elephantiasis, stomach pain and bladder stones. The leaves have been used to treat stomach ailments and as poultices in India and Malaysia. In Assam, India, the leaves are consumed as a leaf vegetable and are fed to domestic rabbits. Phytochemical studies have reported that the leaves are rich in potassium salts, while the floral nectar contains high concentrations of sucrose, together with glucose and fructose. The plant is also used as a green manure and for poles, hedging and fuelwood.

Phytochemical studies have identified numerous bioactive compounds in Thunbergia grandiflora, including alkaloids, flavonoids, iridoid glycosides, glycosides, saponins, tannins and phenolic compounds. Identified constituents include quercetin, kaempferol and limonene. Laboratory studies have reported antioxidant, anti-inflammatory, antimicrobial, anti-arthritic and potential anticancer activity, although these findings are based primarily on experimental research and do not demonstrate clinical efficacy in humans. However, these pharmacological findings are based primarily on experimental studies and do not constitute evidence of clinical efficacy in humans. The study found that a methanolic leaf extract of the plant exhibited anti-trypanosomal activity under experimental conditions. Phytochemical analysis identified several secondary metabolites, including diphyllin and avacennone B, which computational modelling suggested may interact with enzymes involved in the parasite's metabolism. The authors concluded that the species warrants further investigation as a potential source of bioactive compounds for the treatment of trypanosomiasis.

Laboratory studies have reported that Thunbergia grandiflora exhibits antibacterial activity. In one study, extracts of T. grandiflora and Thunbergia fragrans produced greater inhibition of Staphylococcus aureus growth than the streptomycin control under the experimental conditions tested. A laboratory study investigated the antioxidant and anticholinesterase properties of Thunbergia grandiflora in relation to Alzheimer's disease. The extracts demonstrated antioxidant activity and inhibition of cholinesterase enzymes under experimental conditions. The authors suggested that further studies, including dose-response investigations, are needed to evaluate the species' potential as a source of compounds for Alzheimer's disease research.

== Gallery ==
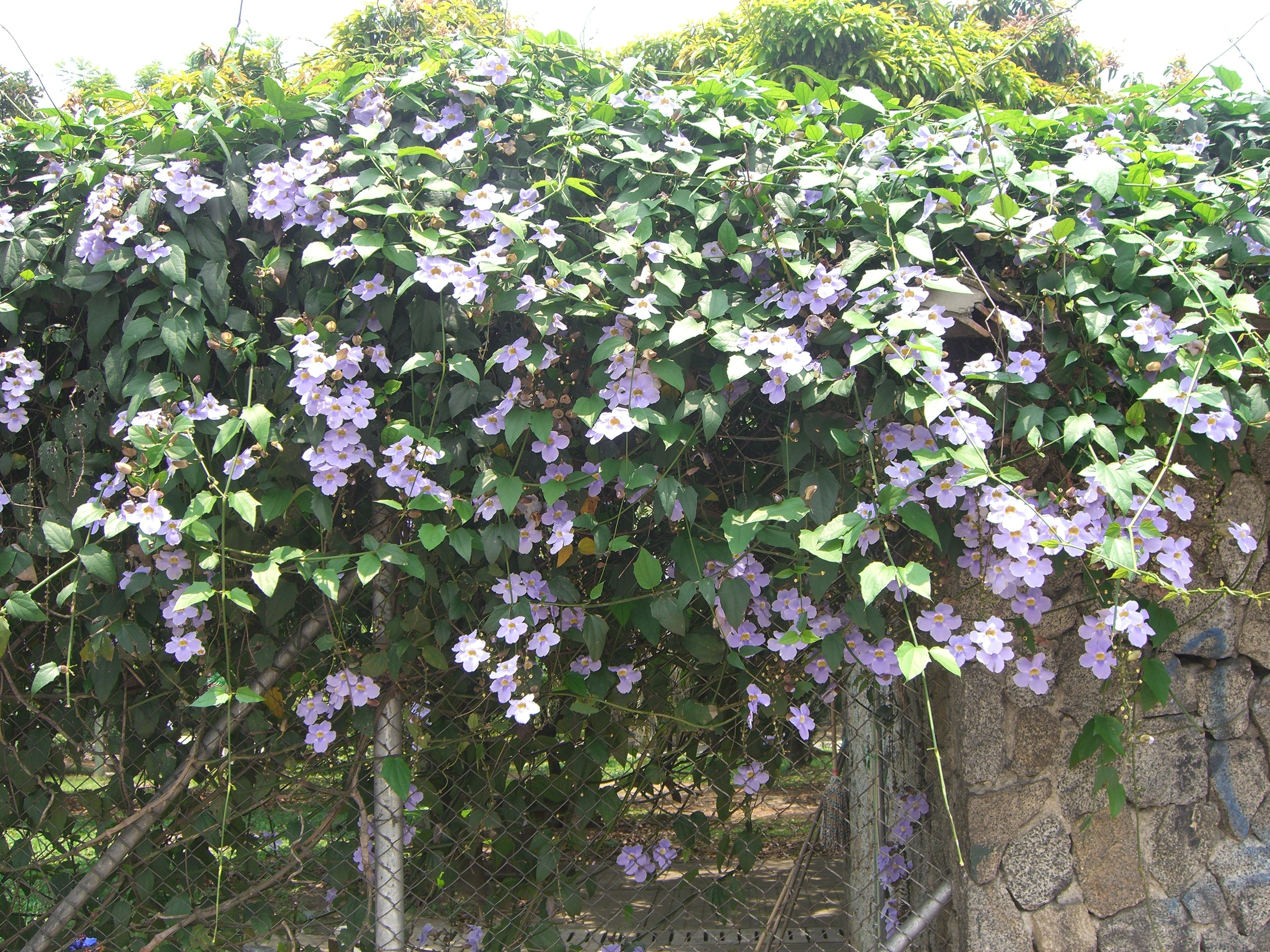
Habit, growing on a fence

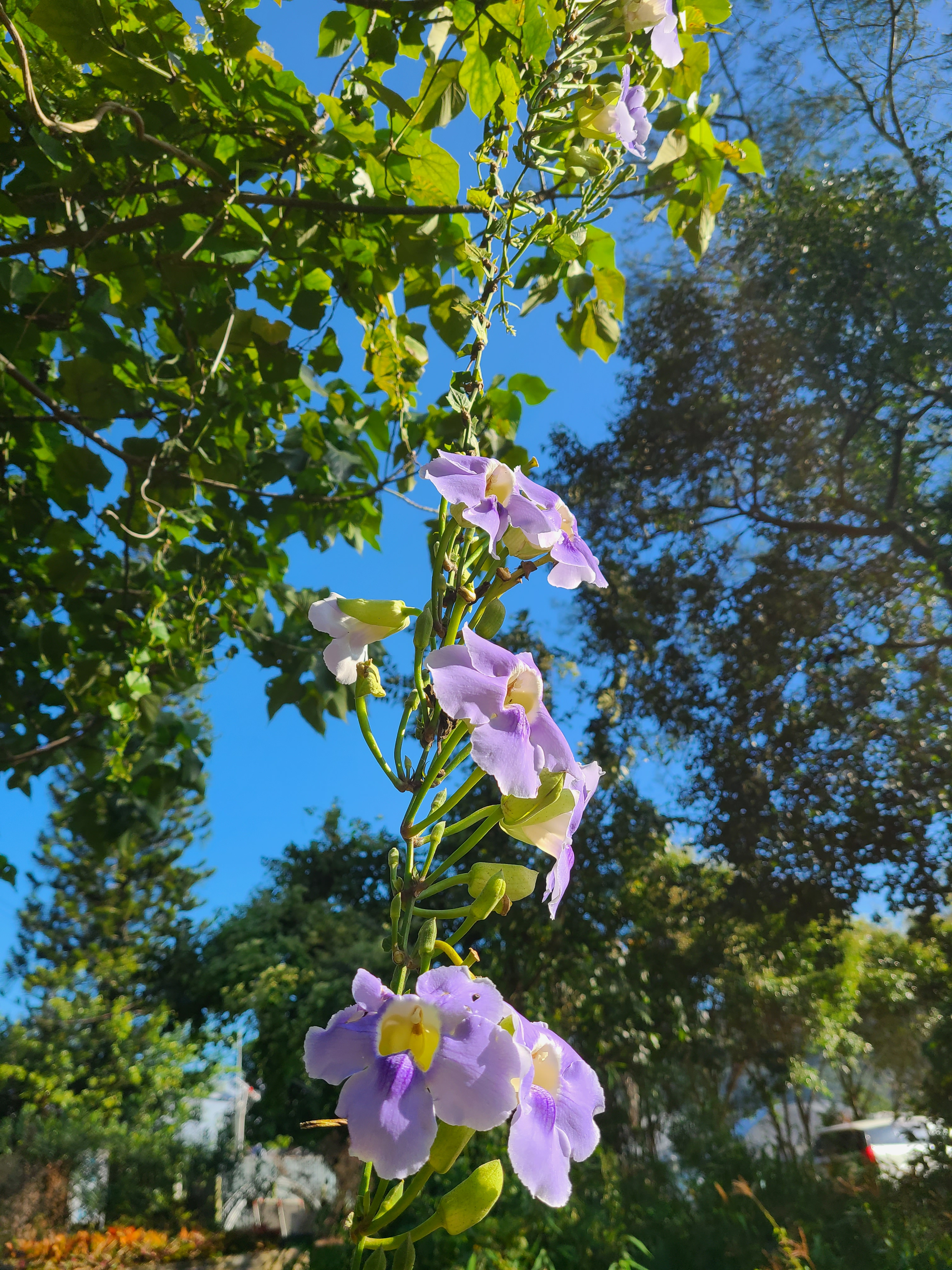
Inflorescence (Hong Kong)

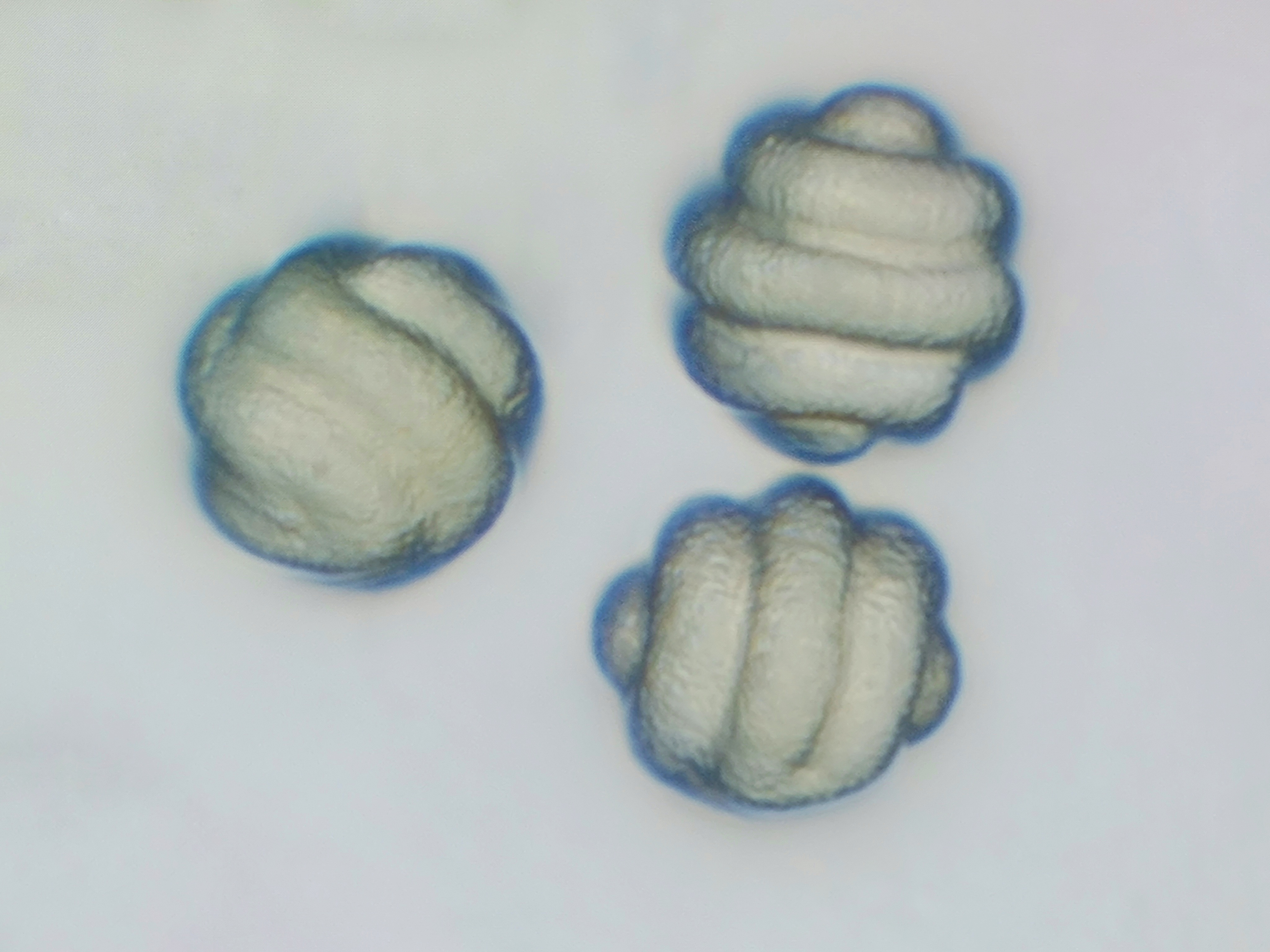
Pollen (Mumbai)

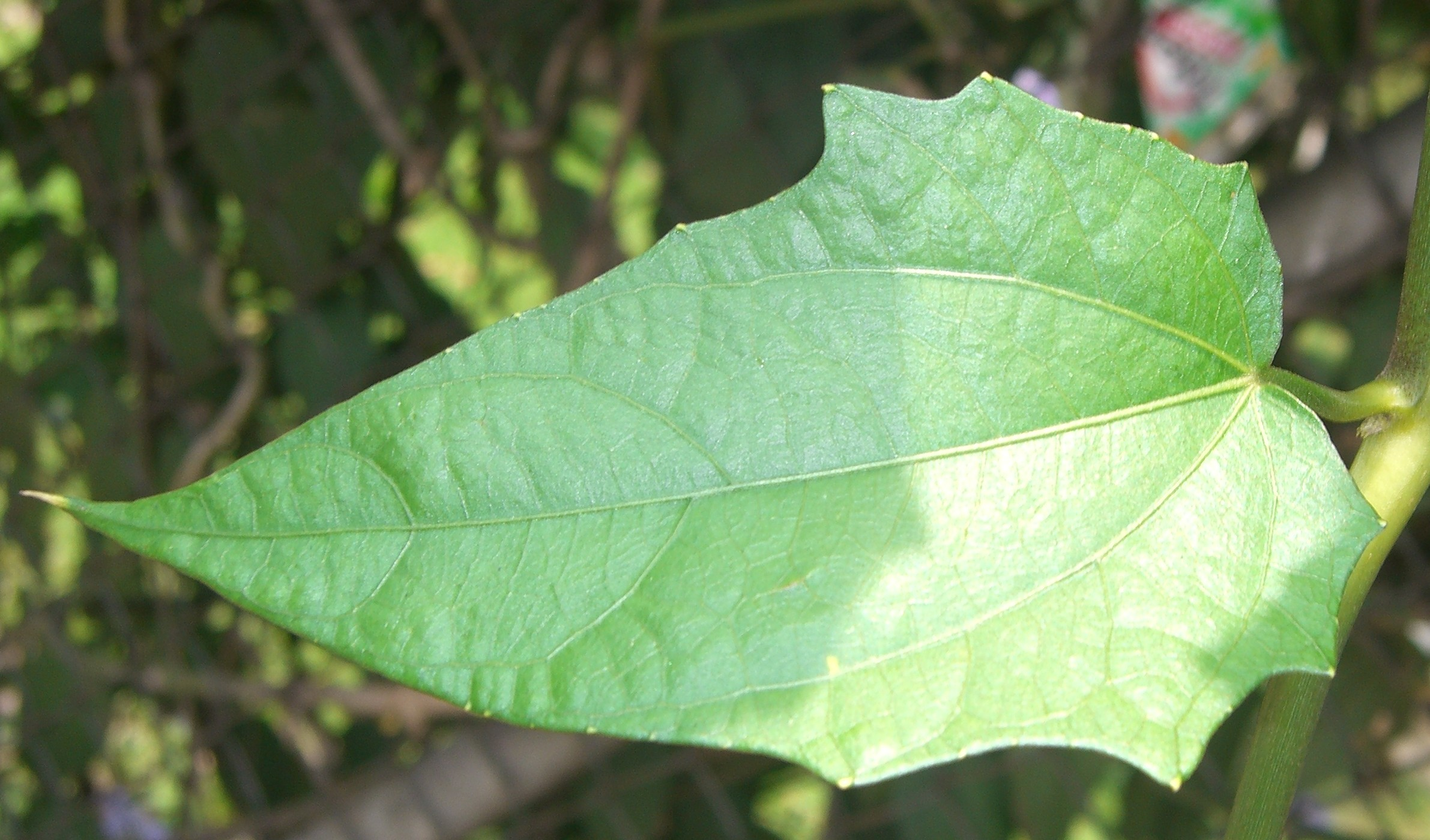
Leaf blade

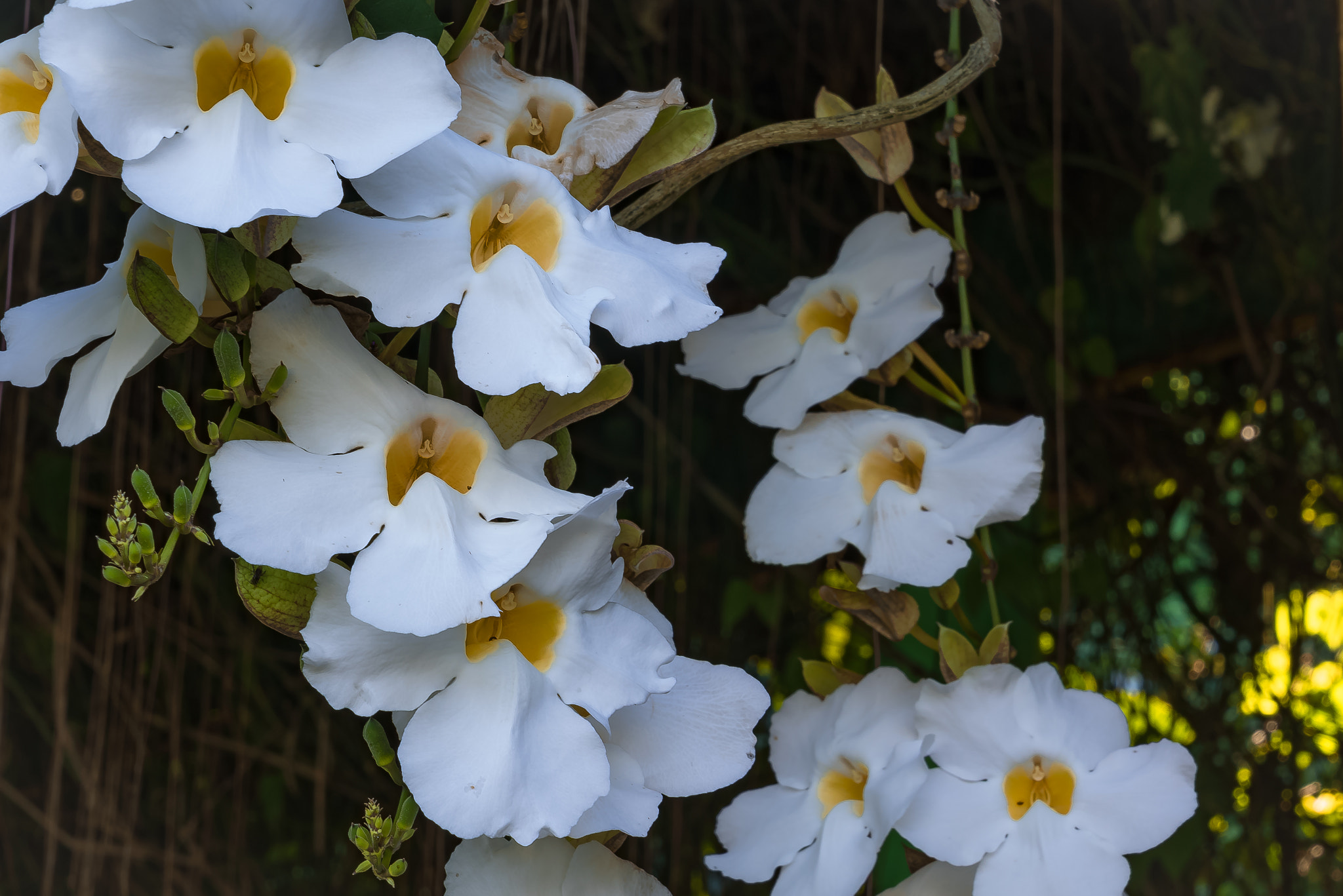
White-flowered variety

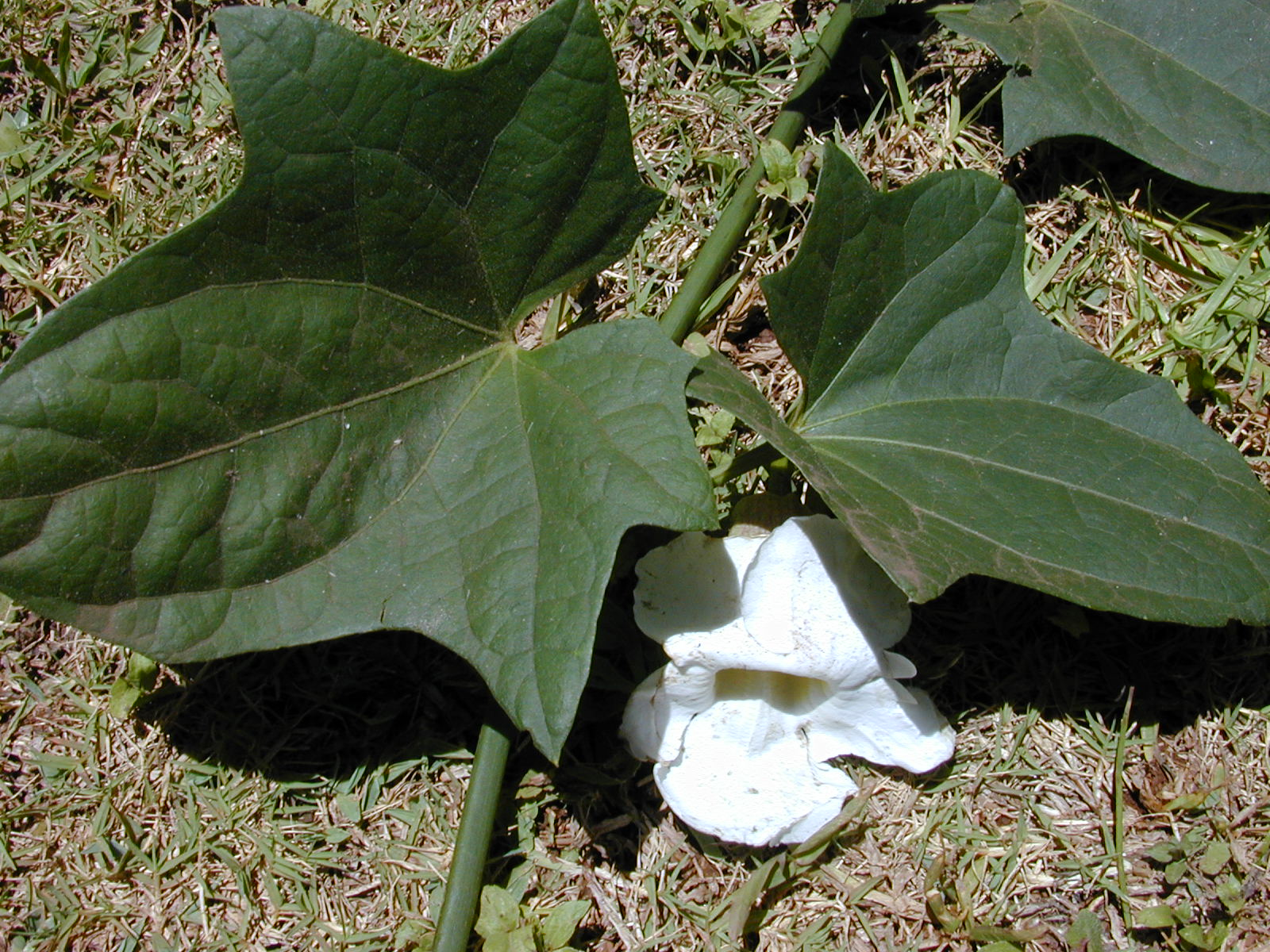
Leaves and flower

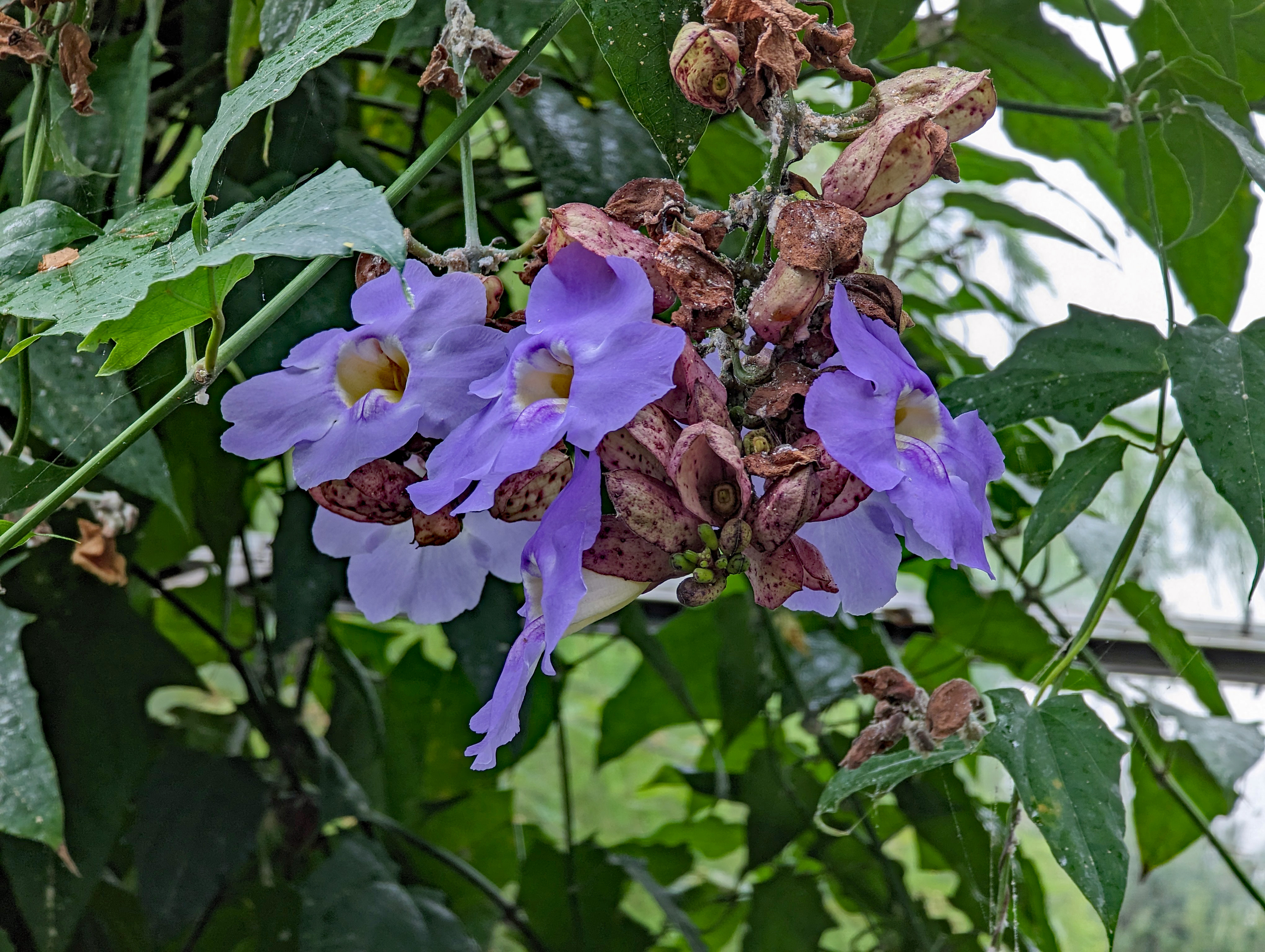
Flowers, some with shed petals leaving the bracts

== See also ==
- Thunbergia erecta
