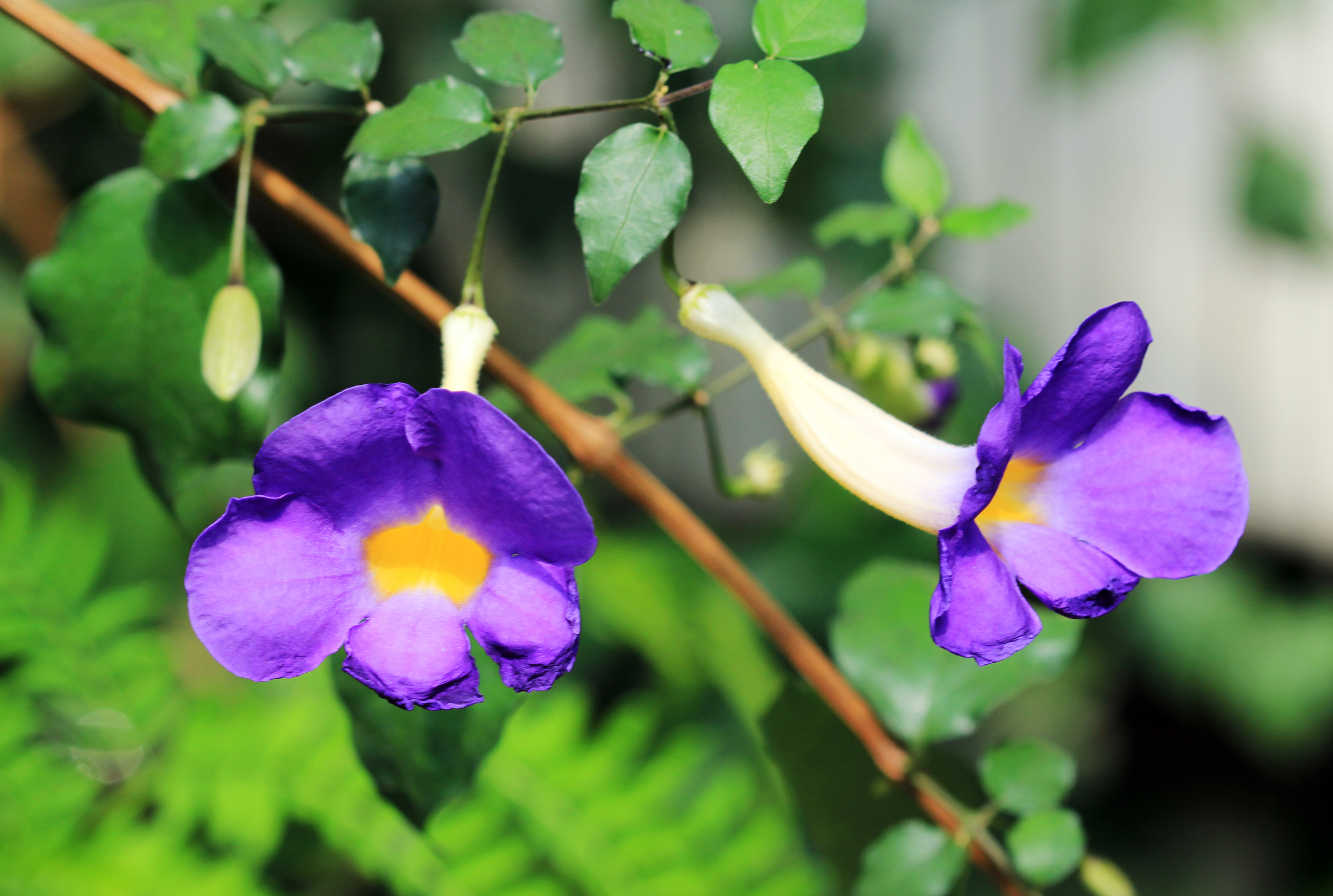

Scientific classification
- Kingdom: Plantae
- Clade: Embryophytes
- Clade: Tracheophytes
- Clade: Spermatophytes
- Clade: Angiosperms
- Clade: Eudicots
- Clade: Asterids
- Order: Lamiales
- Family: Acanthaceae
- Genus: Thunbergia
- Species: T. erecta

Binomial name
- Thunbergia erecta (Benth.) T.Anderson

= Thunbergia erecta =

Species of flowering plant

Thunbergia erecta is a herbaceous, perennial, climbing plant species in the genus Thunbergia native to western Africa. Common names include bush clockvine, king's-mantle and potato bush.

== Description ==
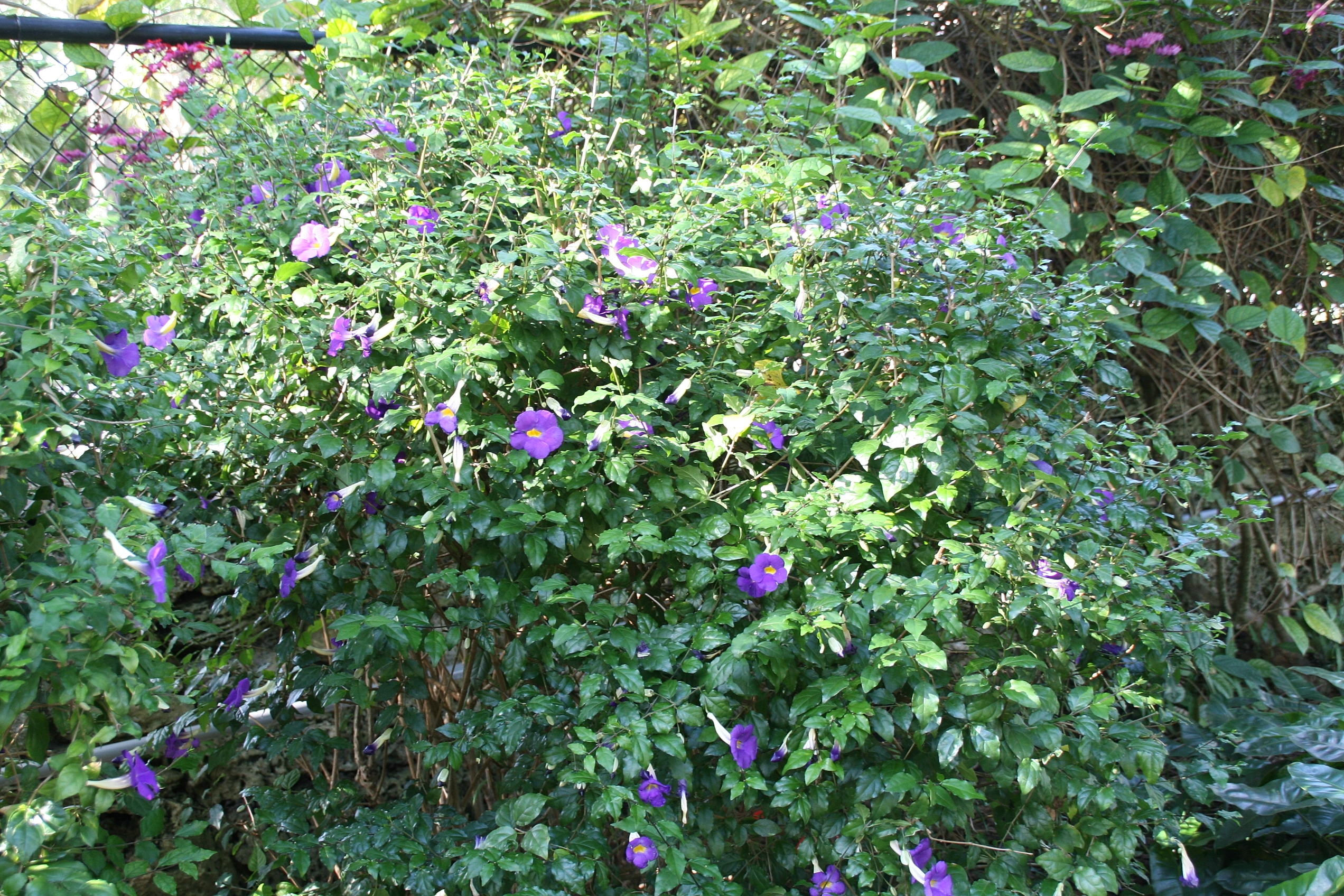
A shrub in Florida

The plant is a scandent, densely branched shrub that produces long stems from the base. The slender stems are erect to semi-erect and become drooping with age, although they may climb if supported or occasionally develop a twining habit. Young stems are quadrangular, with glossy, pale yellow-green bark and narrow wings that form small ear-like projections at the nodes. They are glabrous except for fine lines of hairs on the youngest nodes, becoming woody and reddish-brown as they mature. The species typically grows 1.2 to 1.8 m (3.9 to 5.9 ft) tall and 1.5 to 2.4 m (4.9 to 7.9 ft) wide.

Leaves are arranged in opposite pairs and are ovate, elliptic or lanceolate, measuring up to 8 cm (3.1 in) long and 4 cm (1.6 in) wide. They are dark green, with mostly entire margins, an acute apex and a rounded to cordate base. The blades are glabrous or sparsely hairy along the midrib.

=== Inflorescences ===
The slightly fragrant flowers are borne singly or in pairs in the leaf axils and bloom primarily during summer and autumn. They are typically velvety dark blue to deep purple with a yellow throat, although white, purplish-blue and magenta-flowered forms also occur. Each flower is subtended by two large, pale green, spathe-like bracts. The tubular corolla is 3 to 4 cm (1.2 to 1.6 in) long, flaring into five lobes, while the calyx is divided into 10 to 15 narrow lobes united at the base. The flower contains four stamens arranged in two unequal pairs surrounding an ovary of two fused carpels.

Each flower is borne on a glabrous pedicel 4 to 8 cm (1.6 to 3.1 in) long, with the basal portion not clasped by the leaf. The pale green bracteoles are ovate to elliptic, measuring 2 to 3.5 cm (0.79 to 1.38 in) long and 0.8 to 1.6 cm (0.31 to 0.63 in) wide, with acute to acuminate, rarely obtuse, apices. The filaments measure 10 to 12 mm (0.39 to 0.47 in) and 12 to 14 mm (0.47 to 0.55 in) in length and bear scattered glandular hairs throughout. The anthers are 4 to 5 mm (0.16 to 0.20 in) long. The fruit is a rounded, beaked capsule containing up to four dark brown seeds.

== Cultivation ==
Thunbergia erecta grows best in full sun to partial shade in well-drained soils and is moderately drought-tolerant once established. It is widely cultivated as an ornamental shrub for hedges, borders, foundation plantings and retaining walls, and responds well to regular pruning, although frequent trimming may reduce flowering. Propagation is usually by cuttings or layering. It is generally free of serious pests and diseases, although it may be susceptible to plant-parasitic nematodes.

== Distribution ==
The species is native to tropical Africa, where it occurs in Cameroon, the Central African Republic, the Republic of the Congo, the Democratic Republic of the Congo, Gabon, Ghana, Guinea, Guinea-Bissau, Ivory Coast, Liberia, Nigeria, Rwanda, Senegal, Sierra Leone, Sudan, South Sudan, Tanzania and Uganda.

It has also been introduced to parts of Asia, the Caribbean, Oceania, North America and South America, including Bangladesh, India, Sri Lanka, Mexico, Florida in the United States, Cuba, the Dominican Republic, Haiti, Puerto Rico, Trinidad and Tobago, Venezuela, Fiji and Vanuatu. It inhabits wet evergreen and swamp forests between 800 and 1,150 m (2,620 and 3,770 ft) above sea level.

== Gallery ==
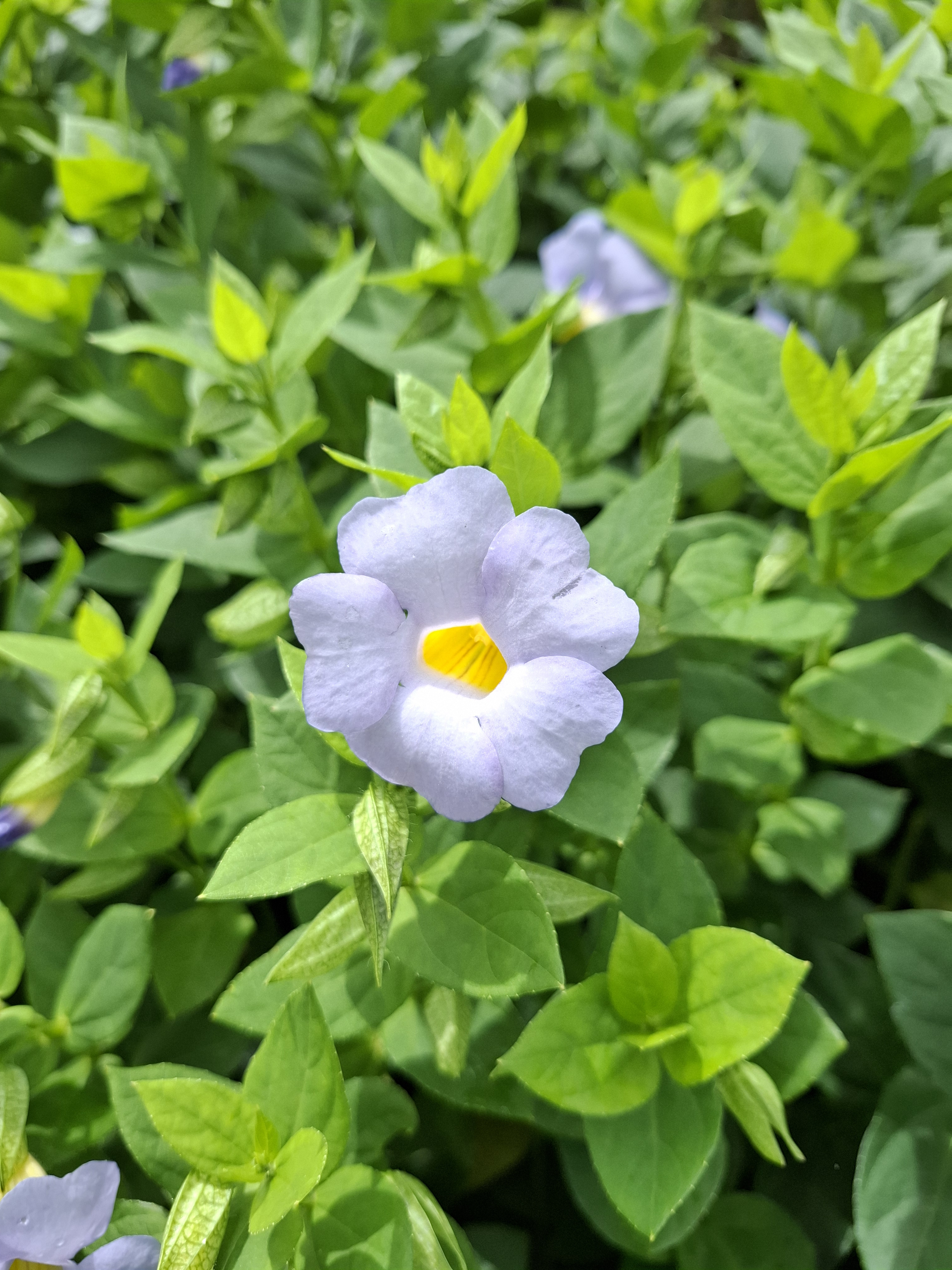
Flower

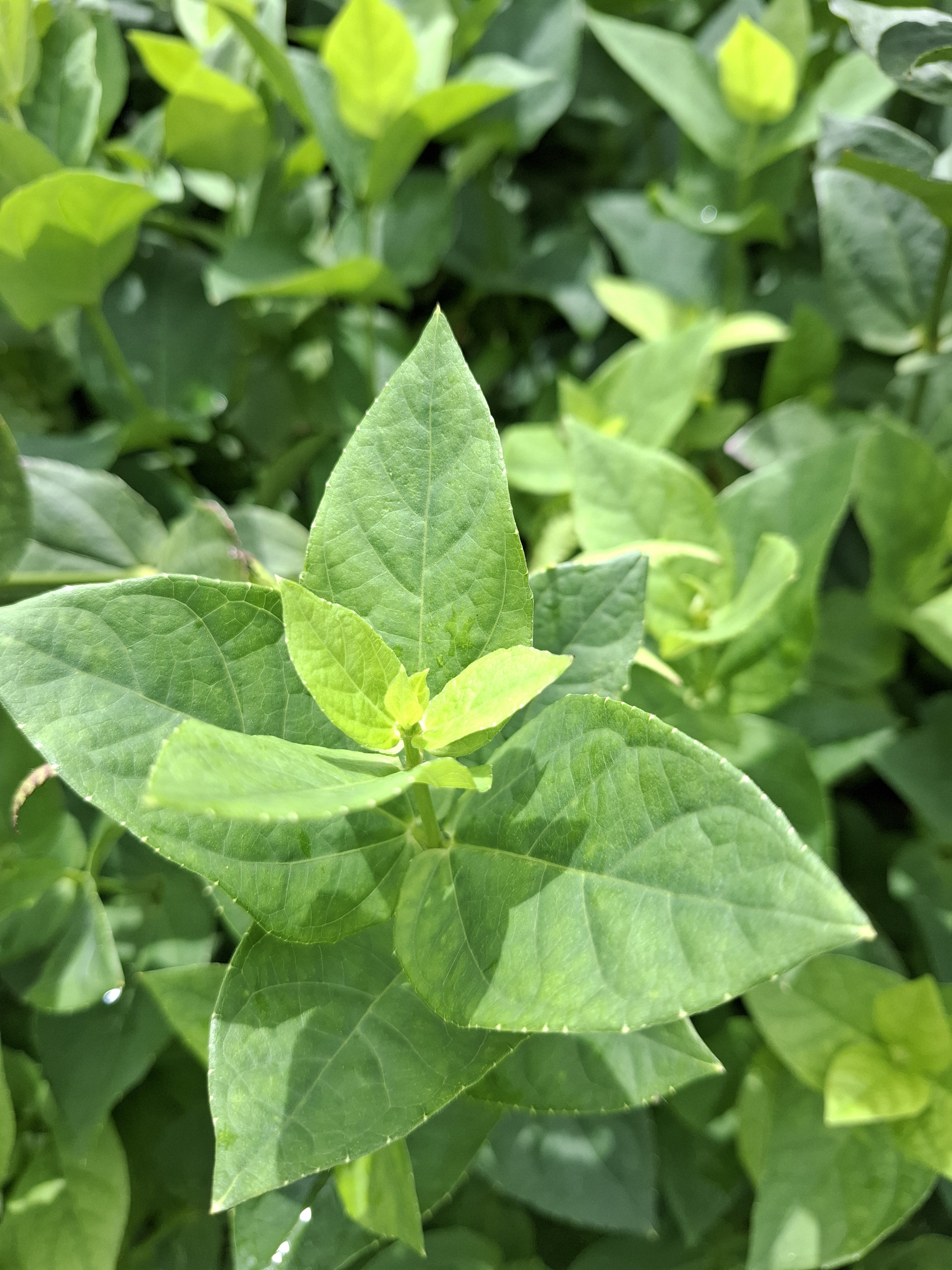
Leaves

== See also ==
- Thunbergia grandiflora
