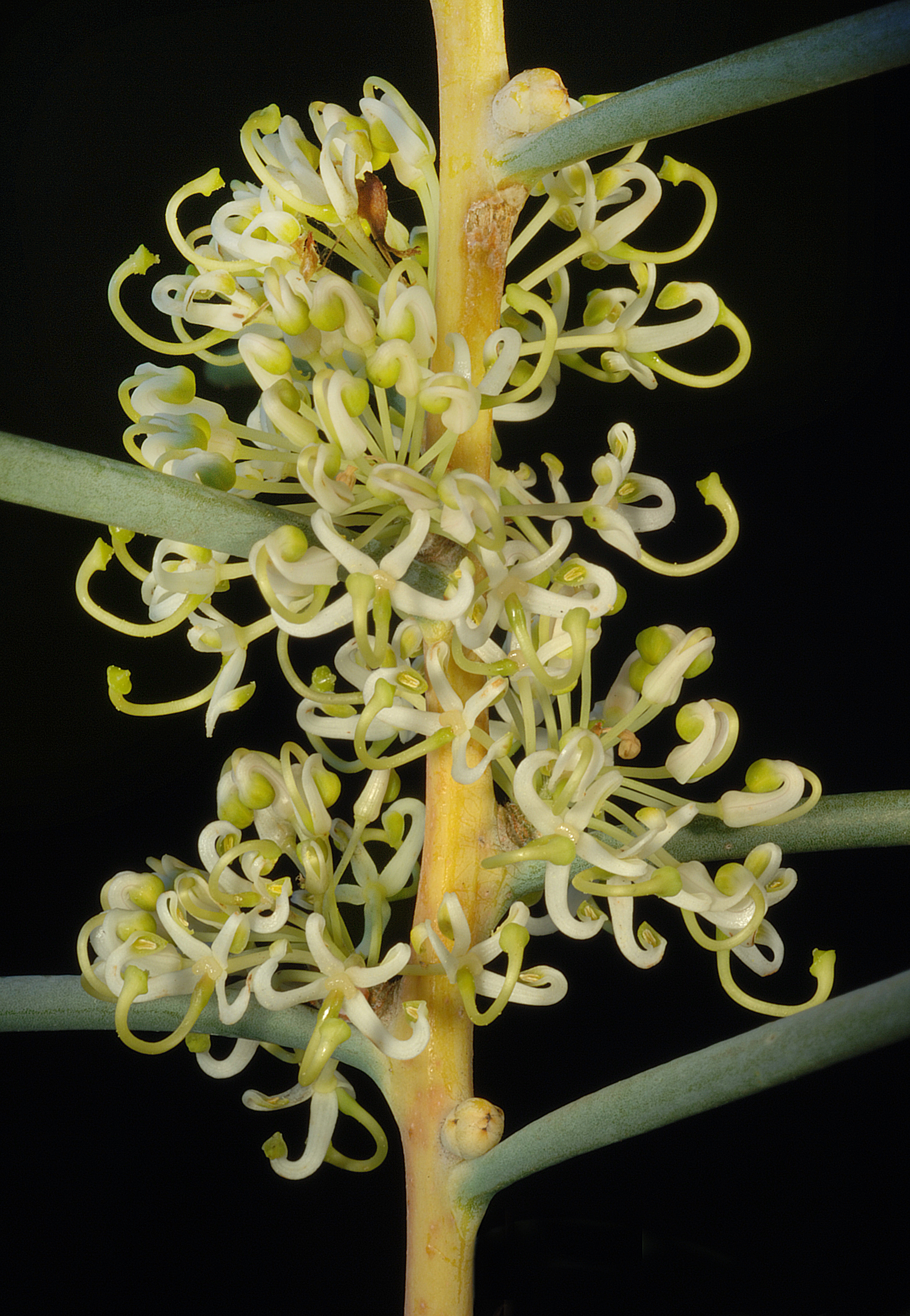

Scientific classification
- Kingdom: Plantae
- Clade: Tracheophytes
- Clade: Angiosperms
- Clade: Eudicots
- Order: Proteales
- Family: Proteaceae
- Genus: Hakea
- Species: H. recurva Meisn.
- Subspecies: H. r. subsp. recurva

Trinomial name
- Hakea recurva subsp. recurva

= Hakea recurva subsp. recurva =

Subspecies of flowering plant

Hakea recurva subsp. recurva is a plant in the family Proteaceae endemic to the south-west of Western Australia.

== Description ==
A multi-stemmed tall shrub or open tree to 7 m (20 ft) high. Leaves are terete thick, rigid, straight and erect or recurved, 5–12 cm (2–5 in) long and 2–3.2 mm (0.08–0.1 in) wide ending in a very sharp point 3.7–5.5 mm (0.1–0.2 in) long. Large sweetly scented creamy-yellow or occasionally pink flowers appear in profusion in clusters in the leaf axils. Egg-shaped fruit 1.5–2.5 cm (0.6–1 in) long by 1–1.3 cm (0.4–0.5 in) wide taper to a blunt beak. Hakea recurva subsp. recurva sheds its seed quickly upon ripening.

== Taxonomy and naming ==
Hakea recurva was first formally described in 1856 by Carl Meissner and Hakea arida in 1904 by Ludwig Diels. In 1999 William and Robyn Barker came to the conclusion that these two species were in fact too much alike to be in separate species. They changed the name Hakea recurva to Hakea recurva subsp. recurva and changed Hakea arida to Hakea recurva subsp. arida. The changes were published on pages 85–87 of Volume 17B of the Flora of Australia.

== Distribution and habitat ==
This species is found north of Perth from the Murchison River through the central wheatbelt region of Western Australia to Kulin and east to Coolgardie. Grows in heath and low woodland on sandy clay over granite or laterite, loam and gravel. A frost tolerant species, requiring full sun and good drainage.
