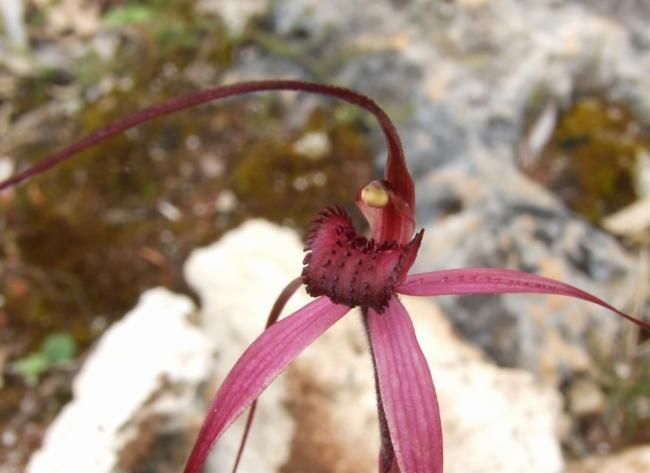

Conservation status
- Vulnerable (EPBC Act)

Scientific classification
- Kingdom: Plantae
- Clade: Tracheophytes
- Clade: Angiosperms
- Clade: Monocots
- Order: Asparagales
- Family: Orchidaceae
- Subfamily: Orchidoideae
- Tribe: Diurideae
- Genus: Caladenia
- Species: C. calcicola

Binomial name
- Caladenia calcicola G.W.Carr

Synonyms
- Arachnorchis calcicola (G.W.Carr) D.L.Jones & M.A.Clem.; Calonema calcicola (G.W.Carr) Szlach. nom. illeg.; Calonema calcicolum W.R.Barker, R.M.Barker, Jessop & Vonow orth. var.; Calonemorchis calcicola (G.W.Carr) Szlach.; Caladenia dilatata auct. non R.Br.: Weber, J.Z. & Bates, R. in Jessop, J.P. & Toelken, H.R. (ed.) (1986)

= Caladenia calcicola =

Bats Ridges spider orchid

Species of orchid

Caladenia calcicola, commonly known as the Bats Ridges spider orchid, is a plant in the orchid family Orchidaceae and is endemic to a small area near the Victoria - South Australia border. It is a ground orchid with a single hairy leaf and one or two glossy, pale yellow flowers with maroon markings.

== Description ==
Caladenia calcicola is a terrestrial, perennial, deciduous herb with an underground tuber and a single lance-shaped, hairy leaf measuring 5 centimetres (2.0 in) to 13 centimetres (5.1 in) in length and 4 millimetres (0.16 in) to 15 millimetres (0.59 in) in width. A single flower, approximately 35 millimetres (1.4 in) to 40 millimetres (1.6 in) wide, is borne on a hairy spike ranging from 11 centimetres (4.3 in) to 22 centimetres (8.7 in) in height. Occasionally, a second flower is present, and the spike may reach up to 28 centimetres (11 in) in height.

The lateral sepals and petals are pale, glossy yellow with a prominent red stripe along the center. The lateral sepals spread widely and curve downwards, 10–40 mm (0.39–1.57 in) long and 2–4 mm (0.079–0.157 in) wide, tapering to thread-like, glandular tips that are yellow to reddish and 2–9 mm (0.079–0.354 in) long. The petals are slightly shorter than the sepals and also taper to fine points. The labellum is 8–15 mm (0.31–0.59 in) long and 7–11 mm (0.28–0.43 in) wide when flattened. It is partly red with a yellowish-cream coloration near the base. The sides of the labellum bear linear teeth up to 1 millimetre (0.039 in) long, and gradually decrease in size toward the tip. Four to six rows of flattened calli run along the mid-line of the labellum’s surface. Flowering occurs from mid-September to early November.

== Taxonomy and naming ==
Caladenia calcicola was first formally described in 1986 by Geoffrey Carr in the journal Muelleria from a specimen collected about 10 km (6.2 mi) west of Portland. The specific epithet (calcicola) is derived from Latin words meaning "lime" and "dweller".

== Distribution and habitat ==
This caladenia grows on low limestone ridges in a few areas west of Portland and a short distance into South Australia.

== Conservation ==
Caladenia calcicola is classified as "vulnerable" under the Commonwealth Government Environment Protection and Biodiversity Conservation Act 1999 (EPBC) Act, as "Endangered" under the South Australian National Parks and Wildlife Act and as "Threatened" under the Victorian Government Flora and Fauna Guarantee Act 1988. The total population in 2007 was estimated to be less than 300.
