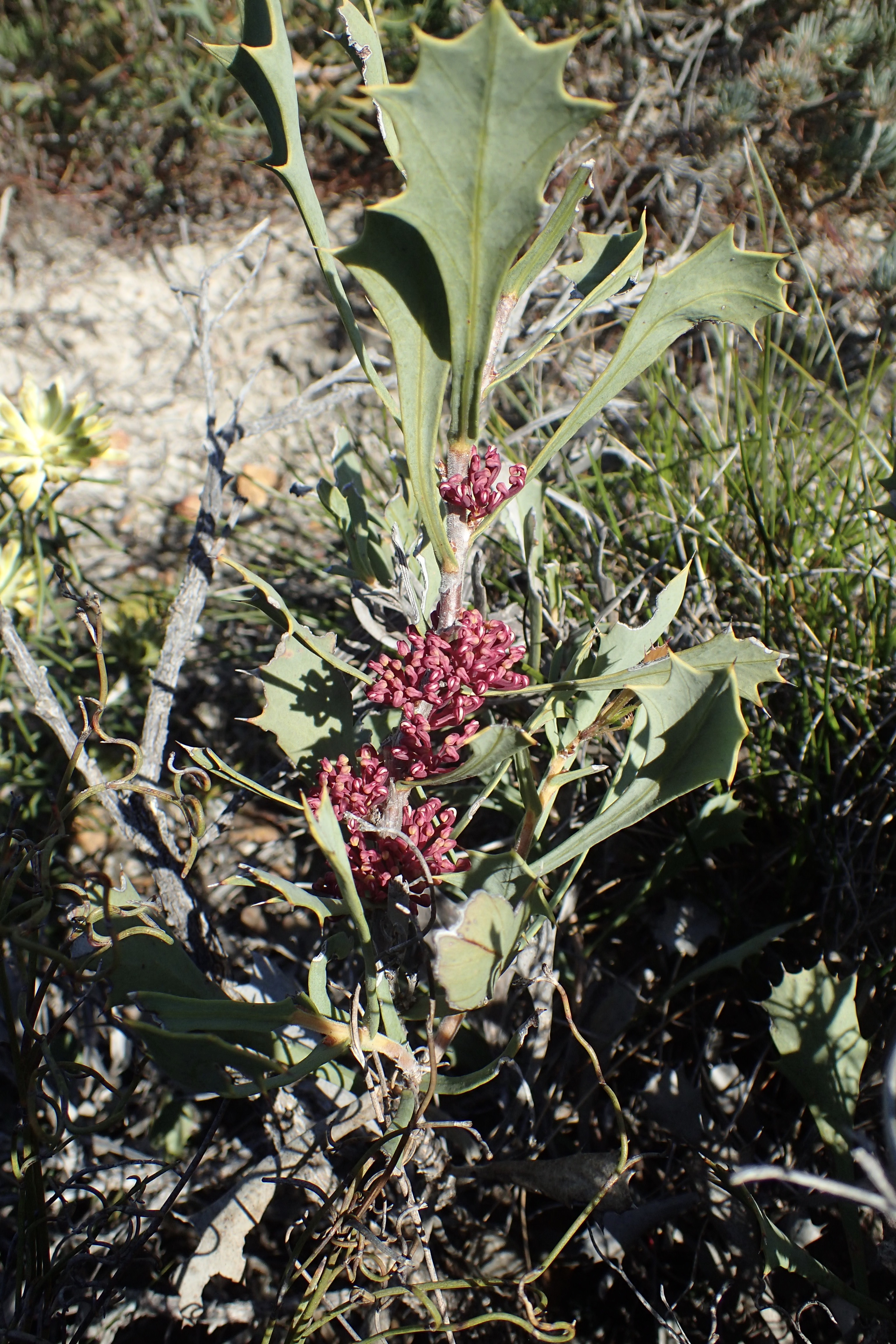
- Near Badgingarra

Scientific classification
- Kingdom: Plantae
- Clade: Tracheophytes
- Clade: Angiosperms
- Clade: Eudicots
- Order: Proteales
- Family: Proteaceae
- Genus: Hakea
- Species: H. neospathulata

Binomial name
- Hakea neospathulata I.M.Turner

Synonyms
- Hakea auriculata var. spathulata Benth.; Hakea sp. nova aff. auriculata; Hakea spathulata (Benth.) R.M.Barker nom. illeg.

= Hakea neospathulata =

Species of shrub endemic to Western Australia

Hakea neospathulata is a flowering plant in the family Proteaceae and is endemic to Western Australia. It is a small, dense shrub with clusters of red flowers.

== Description ==
Hakea neospathulata is a dense shrub with spreading branches, that typically grows to a height of 1–3 m (3 ft 3 in – 9 ft 10 in) and has either smooth or hairy branchlets. The leaves are blue-grey, smooth, narrowly oval to oval shaped, arranged alternately, 2–6.5 cm (0.79–2.56 in) long and 8–16 mm (0.31–0.63 in) wide, gradually narrowing, with prickly toothed margins, and tapering to a point 1.5–2 mm (0.059–0.079 in) long. The inflorescence are usually borne in clusters of 6–14 flowers in lower leaf axils, sometimes in upper axils or old wood on a smooth pedicels 3–5.5 mm (0.12–0.22 in) long, the perianth 1.5–4.5 mm (0.059–0.177 in) long and dark red or purplish. Flowering occurs from August to October and the fruit surface smooth in between sharp points ending with two short horns at the apex.

== Taxonomy and naming ==
This hakea was first described in 1870 by George Bentham who gave it the name Hakea auriculata var. spathulata in Flora Australiensis. In 1990, Robyn Mary Barker raised the variety to species status as Hakea spathulata, noting that H. auriculata has greenish-white, cream-coloured or pink flowers near the ends of branches, whereas H. spathulata has deep red flowers usually found among older brown leaves. However, the name H. spathulata was illegitimate as it had already been validly published by Johannes Theodor Schmalhausen in 1883 as the name of a fossil hakea species found in Russia.

In her 2006 book, Hakeas of Western Australia: a field and identification guide, Jennifer A. Young gave the distribution of H. spathulata as being limited to the area between the Murchison River and Dandaragan, and described the species as being "protected".

In 2014, Ian Mark Turner raised the name Hakea neospathulata to replace the illegitimate H. spathulata. The specific epithet (neospathulata) means "new-spathulate", referring to the new name for H. spathulata.

== Distribution and habitat ==
Hakea neospathulata is found at lower altitudes in sand and loam in scrubland, heath and sometimes in wet locations from the Murchison River and south to Dandaragan in the Avon Wheatbelt, Geraldton Sandplains, Jarrah Forest and Swan Coastal Plain biogeographical regions of south-western Western Australia.

== Conservation status ==
This hakea is classified as "not threatened" by the Government of Western Australia Department of Biodiversity, Conservation and Attractions.
