= Needlewood =

Needlewood is a common name for several plants and may refer to:

- Acacia palustris, a plant of western Australia
- Hakea divaricata, a plant of western Australia
- Hakea leucoptera subsp. leucoptera, a plant of Australia
- Schima wallichii, a tree of China and tropical Asia
