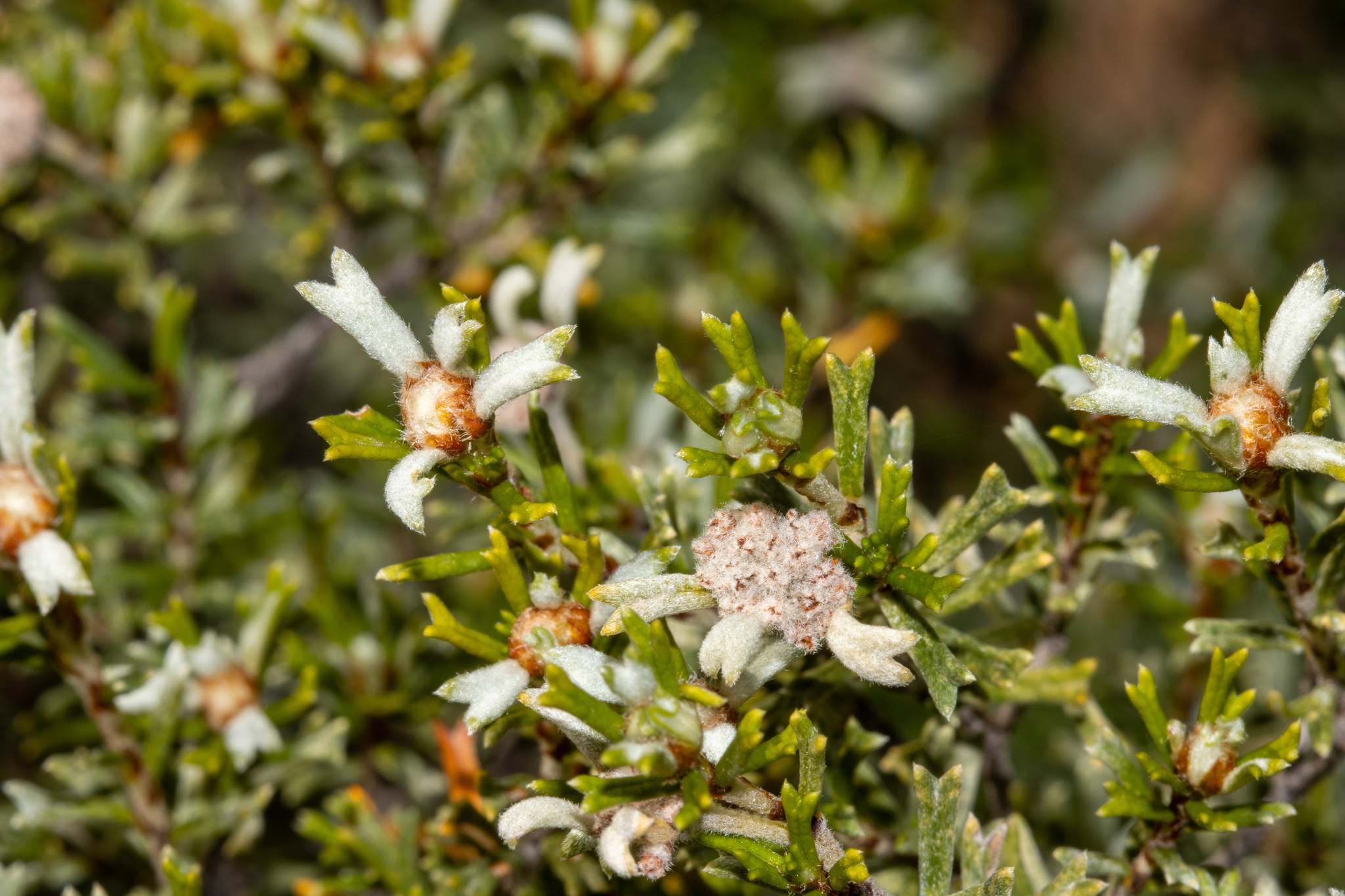
- Near Midgee, South Australia

Scientific classification
- Kingdom: Plantae
- Clade: Tracheophytes
- Clade: Angiosperms
- Clade: Eudicots
- Clade: Rosids
- Order: Rosales
- Family: Rhamnaceae
- Genus: Spyridium
- Species: S. stenophyllum

Binomial name
- Spyridium stenophyllum (Reissek) Kellermann & W.R.Barker

Synonyms
- Trymalium stenophyllum Reissek

= Spyridium stenophyllum =

Species of shrub

Spyridium stenophyllum is a species of flowering plant in the family Rhamnaceae and is endemic to the south of South Australia. It is a sticky shrub with narrowly Y-shaped leaves, and heads of white to cream-coloured flowers surrounded by densely felty-hairy floral leaves.

== Description ==
Spyridium stenophyllum is a sticky shrub that typically grows to a height of up to 1.2 m (3 ft 11 in) and has densely hairy young stems. The leaves are arranged alternately, narrowly Y-shaped or narrowly wedge-shaped, mainly 3.8–7.5 mm (0.15–0.30 in) long and 1.2–2.8 mm (0.047–0.110 in) wide on a petiole 0.9–2.2 mm (0.035–0.087 in) long with triangular to narrowly egg-shaped stipules 2–3.8 mm (0.079–0.150 in) long. The edges of the leaves are turned down or rolled under, the lower surface densely covered with star-shaped hairs. The heads of "flowers" are more or less sessile, 6–11 mm (0.24–0.43 in) in diameter and hairy, surrounded by 3 to 5 densely felty-hairy floral leaves 3.2–7 mm (0.13–0.28 in) long and 1.6–2.8 mm (0.063–0.110 in) wide. The flowers are white to cream-coloured, the floral tube 0.4–0.5 mm (0.016–0.020 in) long. The fruit is an oval to elliptic capsule 1.7–2.0 mm (0.067–0.079 in) long.

== Taxonomy ==
This species was first formally described in 1858 by Siegfried Reissek who gave it the name Trymalium stenophyllum in the journal Linnaea from specimens collected by Johann Friedrich Carl Wilhelmi at "Point Boston". In 2012, Jürgen Kellermann and William Robert Barker changed the name to Spyridium stenophyllum in the journal Muelleria. The specific epithet (stenophyllum) means "narrow-leaved".

In the same journal article, Kellermann and Barker described two subspecies of S. stenophyllum, and the names are accepted by the Australian Plant Census:

- Spyridium stenophyllum subsp. renovatum Kellermann & W.R.Barker has leaves with upwards-pointing hairs on the upper surface, the tip of the leaves curved downwards, and flowers from September to November.
- Spyridium stenophyllum (Reissek) Kellermann & W.R.Barker subsp. stenophyllum has leaves with a glabrous upper surface, the tip of the leaves hidden by a tuft of hairs, and mainly flowers from July to October.

== Distribution and habitat ==
Spyridium stenophyllum grows on sand dunes and in mallee vegetation in southern South Australia. Subspecies renovatum mainly occurs on the Eyre Peninsula and parts of the Flinders Ranges and subsp. stenophyllum is distributed around Arno Bay, along the east coast of the Eyre Peninsula, and in scattered place further inland.
