= Pterostylis uliginosa =

Marsh greenhood

Scientific classification
- Kingdom: Plantae
- Clade: Tracheophytes
- Clade: Angiosperms
- Clade: Monocots
- Order: Asparagales
- Family: Orchidaceae
- Subfamily: Orchidoideae
- Tribe: Cranichideae
- Genus: Pterostylis
- Species: P. uliginosa

Binomial name
- Pterostylis uliginosa D.L.Jones

Synonyms
- Pterostylis aff. aphylla; Pterostylis parviflora var. aphylla W.R.Barker, R.M.Barker, Jessop & Vonow nom. inval., pro syn.; Pterostylis sp. aff. aphylla; Pterostylis sp. aff. aphylla; Speculantha uliginosa (D.L.Jones) D.L.Jones & M.A.Clem.; Pterostylis aphylla auct. non Lindl.: Weber, J.Z. & Bates, R. in Jessop, J.P. & Toelken, H.R. (ed.) (1986)

Species of orchid

Pterostylis uliginosa, commonly known as the marsh greenhood, is a species of orchid endemic to south-eastern Australia. As with similar orchids, flowering plants differ from non-flowering. The non-flowering plants have a rosette of leaves. The flowering plants lack a rosette at the base but have up to three rosettes on lateral growths and up to seven small green and white flowers. This species only grows in wet places, usually where there is free water. There are usually only two or three flowers per plant, and only one or two open at a time.

== Description ==
Pterostylis uliginosa is a terrestrial, perennial, deciduous, herb with an underground tuber and when not flowering, a rosette of three to eight egg-shaped to elliptic, dark green leaves that lie flat on the ground. Each leaf is 5–16 mm (0.2–0.6 in) long and 4–9 mm (0.2–0.4 in) wide. Flowering plants have up to seven bright green and white-striped flowers 6–8 mm (0.2–0.3 in) long and 2–3 mm (0.08–0.1 in) wide, although the usual number is two or three and only one or two are open at a time. The flowers are borne on a fleshy flowering stem 60–150 mm (2–6 in) high. Up to three leaf rosettes are arranged on the side of the flowering spike. The dorsal sepal and petals are fused, forming a hood or "galea" over the column. The dorsal sepal curves forward and has a short point. The lateral sepals are erect and partly close off the front of the flower with thread-like tips about 2 mm (0.08 in) long that do not project above the galea. The sinus between the bases of the lateral sepals bulges forward and has a small notch in the centre. The labellum is 3–4 mm (0.1–0.2 in) long and 1–2 mm (0.04–0.08 in) and not visible outside the intact flower. Flowering occurs from November to March.

== Taxonomy and naming ==
Pterostylis uliginosa was first formally described in 1998 by David Jones and the description was published in Australian Orchid Research. The specific epithet (uliginosa) is a Latin word meaning "full of moisture", "wet" or "marshy", referring to the habitat preference of this species.

== Distribution and habitat ==
The marsh greenhood grows in wet places such as swamps and marshes, with other small plants. It is widely, but disjunctly distributed in Queensland, New South Wales, Victoria, South Australia and Tasmania.
