= Hakea leucoptera subsp. sericipes =

Scientific classification
- Kingdom: Plantae
- Clade: Tracheophytes
- Clade: Angiosperms
- Clade: Eudicots
- Order: Proteales
- Family: Proteaceae
- Genus: Hakea
- Species: H. leucoptera
- Subspecies: H. l. subsp. sericipes

Trinomial name
- Hakea leucoptera subsp. sericipes W.R.Barker

Subspecies of flowering plant

Hakea leucoptera subsp. sericipes is a small tree with cylinder-shaped leaves and clusters of up to forty-five white fragrant flowers. It is found in northwestern New South Wales, Queensland and Western Australia.

== Description ==
Hakea leucoptera subsp. sericipes is a small tree with an open canopy up to 5 m (16 ft) high, or may be a denser, multi-stemmed shrub 2 m (6 ft 7 in) high. It usually has straight, stiff branches and grey bark. The well spaced, long, needle-shaped leaves are a silver-grey, 2–9 cm (0.79–3.54 in) long, 1.2–2 mm (0.047–0.079 in) in diameter ending in a sharp point 1.5–4 mm (0.059–0.157 in) long covered in short, white silky hairs at first, but later becoming hairless. The inflorescence is a cluster of 18–45 yellow or creamy-white flowers scented flowers on a stem 6–14 mm (0.24–0.55 in) long and densely covered, with white, short, soft, matted hairs. The perianth is white, smooth and 3–5 mm (0.12–0.20 in) long. The fruit are smooth, egg-shaped, about 25 mm (0.98 in) long, 20 mm (0.79 in) wide ending with a broad beak. Flowering occurs from November to December.

== Taxonomy and naming ==
Hakea leucoptera was first formally described in 1810 by Robert Brown and the description was published in Transactions of the Linnean Society of London. In 1996 William Baker described two subspecies of H. leucoptera in the Journal of the Adelaide Botanic Garden, including this subspecies and subspecies leucoptera, and the name is accepted by the Australian Plant Census. This subspecies differs from the autonym (subspecies leucoptera) in having shiny hairs pressed against the pedicels. The subspecies epithet (sericipes) is from the Latin words sericeus meaning "silken" and pes meaning "a foot".

== Distribution and habitat ==
Subspecies sericipes is found usually growing in coarse, heavier soils in New South Wales west of the Great Dividing Range and contiguous plains, either as an individual tree or thickets of underbrush shrubs. Also in southern and central Queensland. In dryer areas of central Western Australia.
