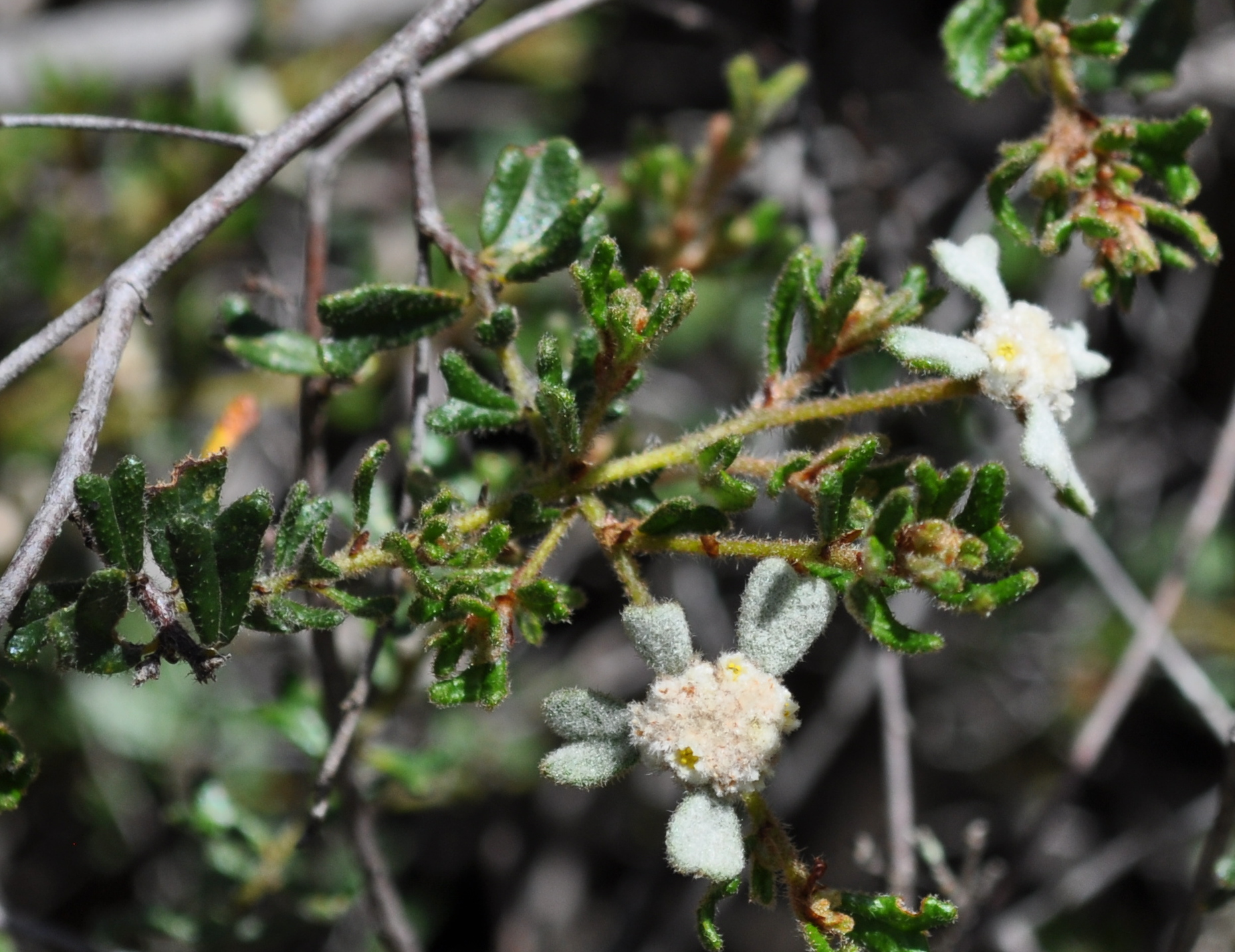
- Near the Little Desert National Park

Conservation status
- Endangered (EPBC Act)

Scientific classification
- Kingdom: Plantae
- Clade: Tracheophytes
- Clade: Angiosperms
- Clade: Eudicots
- Clade: Rosids
- Order: Rosales
- Family: Rhamnaceae
- Genus: Spyridium
- Species: S. furculentum

Binomial name
- Spyridium furculentum W.R.Barker & Kellermann

= Spyridium furculentum =

Species of shrub

Spyridium furculentum, commonly known as forked spyridium, is a species of flowering plant in the family Rhamnaceae and is endemic to a small area of Victoria in Australia. It is a shrub with softly-hairy young stems, Y-shaped leaves, and head of white to cream-coloured flowers.

== Description ==
Spyridium fontis-woodii is a shrub that typically grows to a height of up to about 1.6 m (5 ft 3 in), its young stems densely covered with soft, star-shaped hairs. Its leaves are usually Y-shaped, 6–10 mm (0.24–0.39 in) long, the lobes about the same length as the undivided part, and 1–2 mm (0.039–0.079 in) wide, the petiole 0.9–1.5 mm (0.035–0.059 in) long. There are reddish-brown, broadly egg-shaped stipules 1.3–2.8 mm (0.051–0.110 in) long at the base of the petiole. The edges of the leaves are rolled under and the lower surface is covered with star-shaped hairs. The heads of flowers are hemispherical, about 10 mm (0.39 in) in diameter with 2 to 5 floral leaves, enlarged stipules and papery bracts and at the base, the individual flowers white to cream-coloured. The floral tube is 0.4–0.5 mm (0.016–0.020 in) long, the sepals 0.6–0.8 mm (0.024–0.031 in) long and the petals about 0.3–0.5 mm (0.012–0.020 in) long. Flowering occurs in spring and the fruit is a capsule about 2.5 mm (0.098 in) long.

== Taxonomy ==
Spyridium furculentum was first formally described in 2012 by William Barker and Jürgen Kellermann in the journal Muelleria from specimens collected south of the Little Desert National Park boundary in 1995. The specific epithet (furculentum) is derived from Latin, meaning "forked" and "marked development", referring to the prominently forked leaves.

== Distribution ==
This species of Spyridium grows in mallee woodland south of the Little Desert National Park, between Goroke and Dimboola.

== Conservation status ==
This species is listed as "endangered" under the Australian Government Environment Protection and Biodiversity Conservation Act 1999 and as "critically endangered" under the Victorian Government Flora and Fauna Guarantee Act 1988. The main threats to the species include road maintenance, clearance of native vegetation, trampling by apiarists, and weed invasion.
