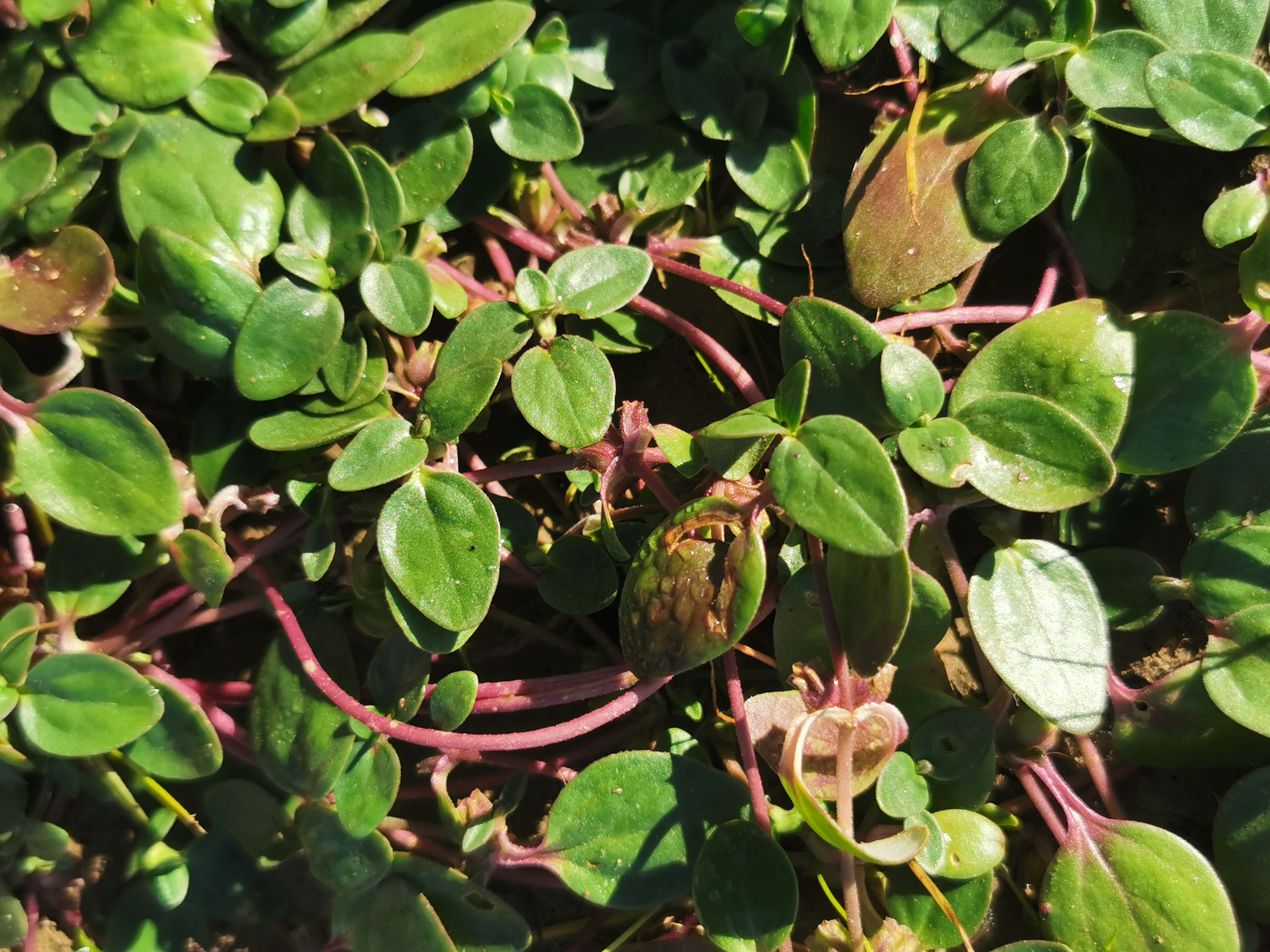
- near Narran Lake Nature Reserve

Scientific classification
- Kingdom: Plantae
- Clade: Tracheophytes
- Clade: Angiosperms
- Clade: Eudicots
- Clade: Asterids
- Order: Lamiales
- Family: Phrymaceae
- Genus: Peplidium
- Species: P. foecundum

Binomial name
- Peplidium foecundum W.R.Barker

= Peplidium foecundum =

Species of plant

Peplidium foecundum is a plant in the Phrymaceae family, native to South Australia, Queensland, the Northern Territory and New South Wales.

It was first described by William Robert Barker in 1992. The species epithet, foecundum, is a Latin adjective which describes the plant as "fruitful".

== Description ==
Peplidium foecundum is a prostrate terrestrial or aquatic plant with rooting branches. Its leaves are fleshy, and up to 3 cm long on short (c. 0.5 mm) petioles. The leaves can float when found in water. The flowers are small and solitary, growing on short shoots in the leaf axils, as racemes. There are two stamens. The fruit is an ovoid to globular capsule.

== Habitat ==
It is found in and beside ephemeral pools, in swamps, on and in the margins of claypans and swales.
