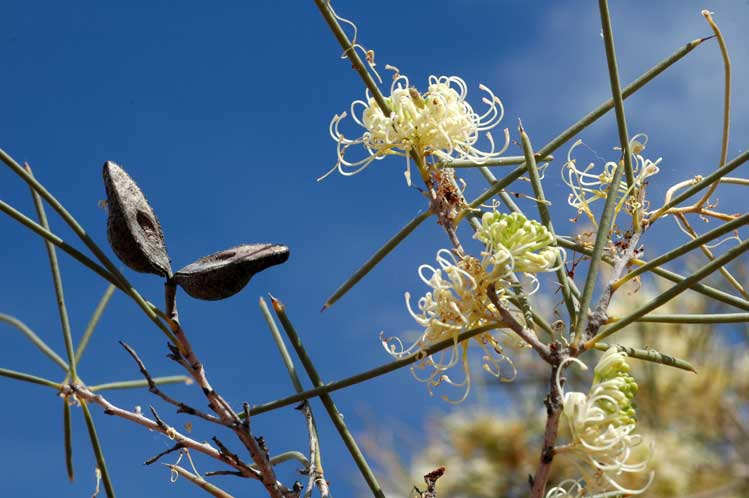
- Near Wanaaring, New South Wales

Scientific classification
- Kingdom: Plantae
- Clade: Tracheophytes
- Clade: Angiosperms
- Clade: Eudicots
- Order: Proteales
- Family: Proteaceae
- Genus: Hakea
- Species: H. leucoptera

Binomial name
- Hakea leucoptera R.Br.
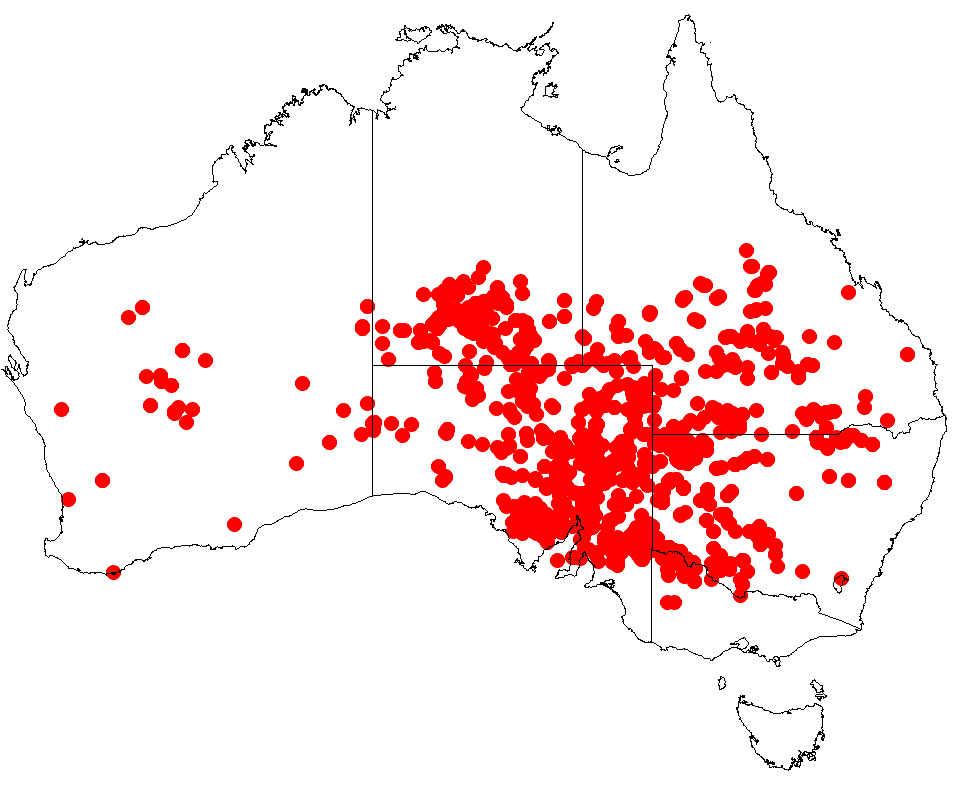
- Occurrence data from AVH

= Hakea leucoptera =

Species of plant endemic to Australia

Hakea leucoptera, commonly known as silver needlewood, needle hakea, pin bush or water tree and as booldoobah in the Koori language, is a shrub or small tree with rigid, cylindrical, sharply pointed leaves and white, cream-coloured or yellow flowers in late spring and early summer. It is widespread and common in central parts of the Australian mainland.

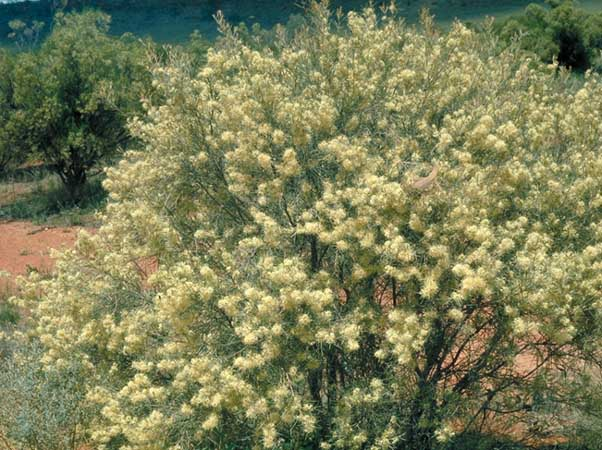
Habit

== Description ==
The habit of this plant is highly variable. It can be a small open branched tree to 5 m (20 ft) or a small multi stemmed shrub to 3 m (10 ft). The habitat is usually coarse textured soils and associated with a wide variety of species in woodland communities. It is widespread throughout all mainland states occurring in dense thickets of shrubs, as scattered individual trees or a large parent tree surrounded by offspring. It has a reddish-brown close-grained timber that is soft but hard and brittle when dry.

The silvery grey to grey-blue leaves are arranged alternately along the stems. They are rigid and cylindrical in varying length from 8–35 mm (0.3–1 in) long and approximately 1.5 mm (0.06 in) wide with a sharp pointed tip. The young leaves are hoary but as they mature they become smooth.

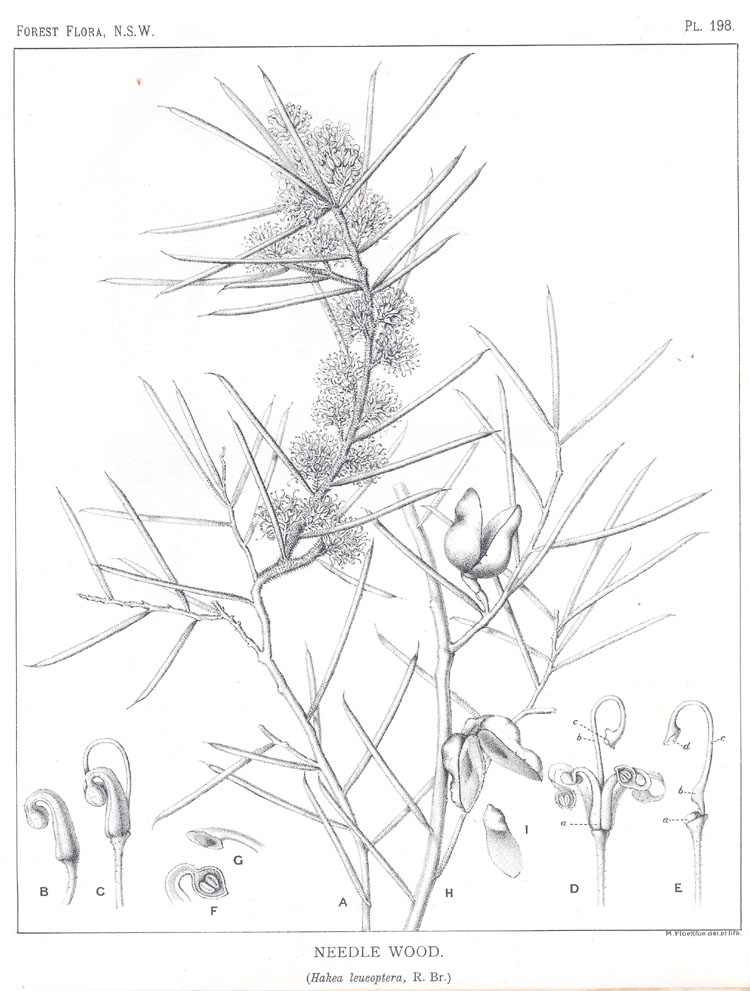
Line drawing of H. leucoptera

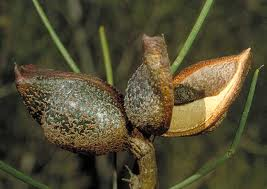
Fruit

Showy creamy white flowers are formed on short hairless stalks about 4 mm (0.2 in) long in clusters of 20 or more in axillary racemes. Hakea leucoptera flowers from late spring to summer. Fruit comprises a woody follicle about 20–30 mm (0.8–1 in) long which is swollen at the base but tapers to a point. The capsules open in halves longitudinally revealing 2 seeds that have an opaque wing on one side only. The woody seed can persist on the branches until after the following years flowering. Immature seed will not ripen off the plant and it is best to collect older fruits. Crop size varies from year to year. Once removed the fruits usually dry out and open within 1–2 weeks. It is easily grown from fresh seed which usually germinates in 3–6 weeks and seed is suitable for direct seeding.

== Taxonomy and naming ==
Hakea leucoptera was first formally described in 1810 by Robert Brown and the description was published in Transactions of the Linnean Society of London. The specific epithet (leucoptera) is derived from the Ancient Greek words leukos meaning "white" and pteron meaning "feather", "wing" or "fin".

In 1996 William Baker described two subspecies of H. leucoptera:

- Hakea leucoptera subsp. leucoptera which has white woolly pubescent (raised) hairs on the rachis of the inflorescence;
- Hakea leucoptera subsp. sericipes which has shining white or brown and appressed (not raised) hairs.

Hakea leucoptera was treated as part of the Sericea group, a predominantly eastern states group characterised by their simple terete leaves, few-flowered inflorescences, hairy pedicels and solitary, prominently woody fruits, these often markedly verrucose or pusticulate and usually with horns. Other members of the group are H. actites, H. constablei, H. decurrens, H. gibbosa, H. kippistiana, H. lissosperma, H. macraeana, H. macrorrhyncha, H. ochroptera, H. sericea and H. tephrosperma, predominantly from the eastern states of Australia.

Hakea leucoptera and H. tephrosperma are often confused. Initially they can often be distinguished by the mucro, curved in H. tephrosperma and usually porrect in H. leucoptera. H. tephrosperma also has a shorter floral rachis with rust-coloured hairs, and the pedicel and perianth are densely appressed-pubescent, while H. leucoptera has a longer floral rachis. Pubescent flowers in H. leucoptera seem to be confined to S.A. and N.T.

== Distribution ==
It is found in every state of Australia except Tasmania and is commonly known as a dry country species particularly arid and semi arid regions.

== Uses ==
Shrubby forms are palatable to stock but only in times of acute feed shortage.

Smoking pipes have been manufactured from the roots and in 1895 the Australian Needle-wood Pipe Company was formed in Sydney.

This plant was important to the Indigenous people and inland explorers as they sourced water from the roots. The tree was burnt which forced the water into the root system, then the roots were dug up. They were stripped, one end placed over a slow fire while the other over a container to force the water out. This feature also enabled the plant to quickly regenerate after fire.

A sweet nutritious drink was made by dipping heavily laden blossom into a cup of water or by sucking the flowers directly. Hakea leucoptera flowers produce a high quality honey favoured by bees.

The Indigenous people of inland Australia used corkwoods as a medicinal agent. Burns and open sores were directly applied with the burnt bark of the Hakea tree or the burnt bark mixture was combined with animal fat to make a healing ointment.

The seed pods were also used for decoration by Indigenous people. The timber polishes up well and haves a very showy grain and was also used for small tannery articles.

== See also ==
- Hakea
- Proteaceae
