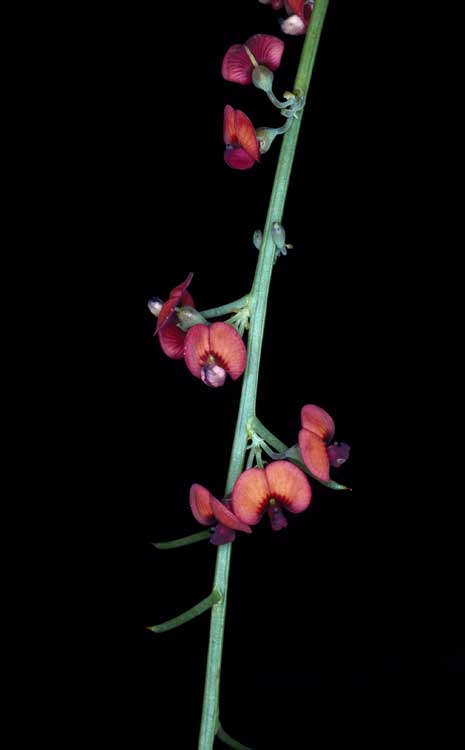
- In the Australian National Botanic Gardens

Scientific classification
- Kingdom: Plantae
- Clade: Tracheophytes
- Clade: Angiosperms
- Clade: Eudicots
- Clade: Rosids
- Order: Fabales
- Family: Fabaceae
- Subfamily: Faboideae
- Genus: Daviesia
- Species: D. inflata

Binomial name
- Daviesia inflata Crisp

= Daviesia inflata =

Species of flowering plant

Daviesia inflata is a species of flowering plant in the family Fabaceae and is endemic to the south-west of Western Australia. It is an erect shrub with many spreading stems, scattered needle-shaped, sharply-pointed phyllodes and orange red flowers with a dark red centre.

== Description ==
Daviesia inflata is a glabrous, erect shrub that typically grows to a height of up to 1 m (3 ft 3 in), and has many sparsely-branched stems. Its phyllodes are scattered, needle-shaped, sharply-pointed, 5–80 mm (0.20–3.15 in) long and 0.5–1.5 mm (0.020–0.059 in) wide. The flowers are arranged in groups of two to five in leaf axils on a peduncle 1.5–3.5 mm (0.059–0.138 in) long, the rachis 1–5 mm (0.039–0.197 in) long, each flower on a pedicel 3–9 mm (0.12–0.35 in) long. The sepals are 4.0–4.5 mm (0.16–0.18 in) long and joined at the base, the upper two lobes joined for most of their length and the lower three triangular and about 1 mm (0.039 in) long. The standard petal is broadly egg-shaped, 10–11 mm (0.39–0.43 in) long and orange-red with a dark red centre, the wings 7.5–8.5 mm (0.30–0.33 in) long and dark red, and the keel 7.5–8.5 mm (0.30–0.33 in) long and dark red. Flowering occurs in September and October and the fruit is a bladder-like pod when immature, later brittle, 15–18 mm (0.59–0.71 in) long.

== Taxonomy and naming ==
Daviesia inflata was first formally described in 1984 by Michael Crisp in the journal Nuytsia from specimens collected near Augusta by W.R. Barker in 1977. The specific epithet (inflata) means "bladdery", referring to the immature fruit.

== Distribution and habitat ==
This daviesia grows in swampy or winter-wet areas in heath or forest and occurs in near-coastal areas between Harvey and Augusta in the Jarrah Forest, Mallee, Swan Coastal Plain and Warren biogeographic regions of south-western Western Australia.

== Conservation status ==
Daviesia inflata is listed as "not threatened" by the Department of Biodiversity, Conservation and Attractions.
