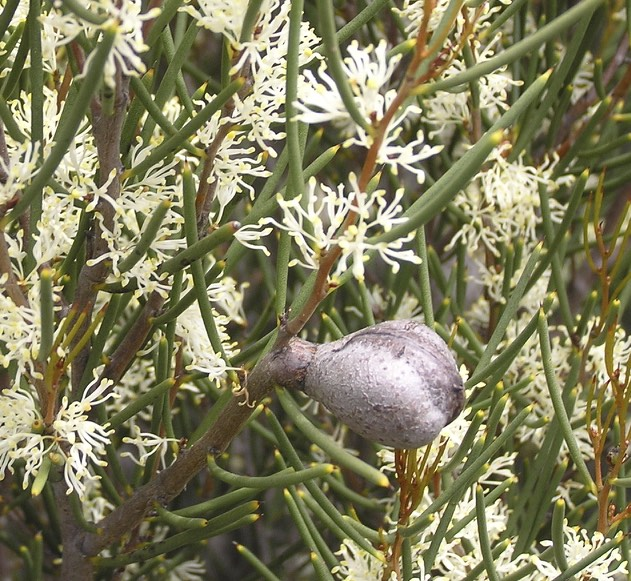
- Hakea newbeyana growing near Lake King

Scientific classification
- Kingdom: Plantae
- Clade: Tracheophytes
- Clade: Angiosperms
- Clade: Eudicots
- Order: Proteales
- Family: Proteaceae
- Genus: Hakea
- Species: H. newbeyana

Binomial name
- Hakea newbeyana R.M.Barker
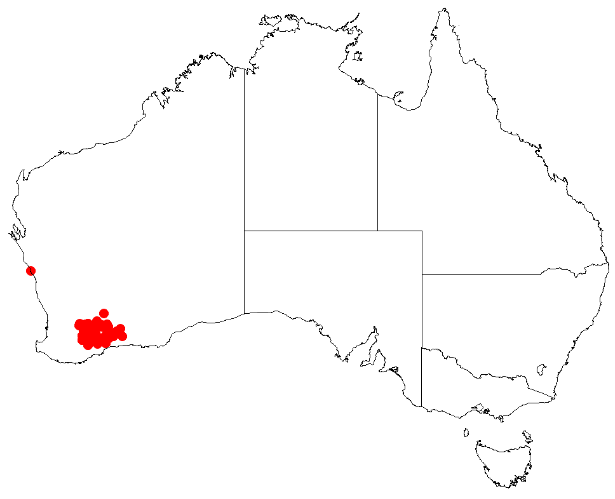
- Occurrence data from AVH

= Hakea newbeyana =

Species of shrub endemic to Western Australia

Hakea newbeyana is a shrub in the family Proteaceae and is endemic to an area in the southern Wheatbelt and Goldfields-Esperance regions of Western Australia. It is a prickly shrub with smooth grey bark and sweetly scented cream-yellow flowers in profusion in spring.

== Description ==
Hakea newbeyana is a rigid, spreading, rounded shrub typically growing to a height of 1 to 4 metres (3.3 to 13.1 ft) with ascending smooth grey branches and does not form a lignotuber. The branchlets are densely covered in flattened rusty-coloured, soft hairs. The rigid dark green leaves are needle-shaped, 2.5–7.5 cm (0.98–2.95 in) long, 1–2.2 mm (0.039–0.087 in) wide, straight to slightly curved and ending in a sharp point 1–3 mm (0.039–0.118 in) long. The 6–8 small, sweetly scented creamy-white and yellow flowers appear in clusters in leaf axils on a coarse rough stalk 1–4 mm (0.039–0.157 in) long. The over-lapping flower bracts are 4–4.5 mm (0.16–0.18 in) long. The pedicel 2.5–3.5 mm (0.098–0.138 in) long and smooth. The smooth, yellow perianth is 2–3 mm (0.079–0.118 in) long and the pistil 3.8–4.5 mm (0.15–0.18 in) long. Flowering occurs from September to October. The large, grey, egg-shaped fruit are smooth with darker blister-like pitting on the surface and taper to a small blunt beak.

== Taxonomy and naming ==
Hakea newbeyana was first formally described by Robyn Mary Barker in 1990 and the description was published in the Journal of the Adelaide Botanic Gardens. The species was named in honour of Western Australian botanist Kenneth Newbey.

== Distribution and habitat ==
This species grows in the central and eastern wheatbelt region of Western Australia in sandy loam and lateritic gravelly soils. Also in woodlands of the Hyden-Newdgate district.

== Conservation status ==
Hakea newbeyana is classified as "not threatened" by the Western Australian Government.
