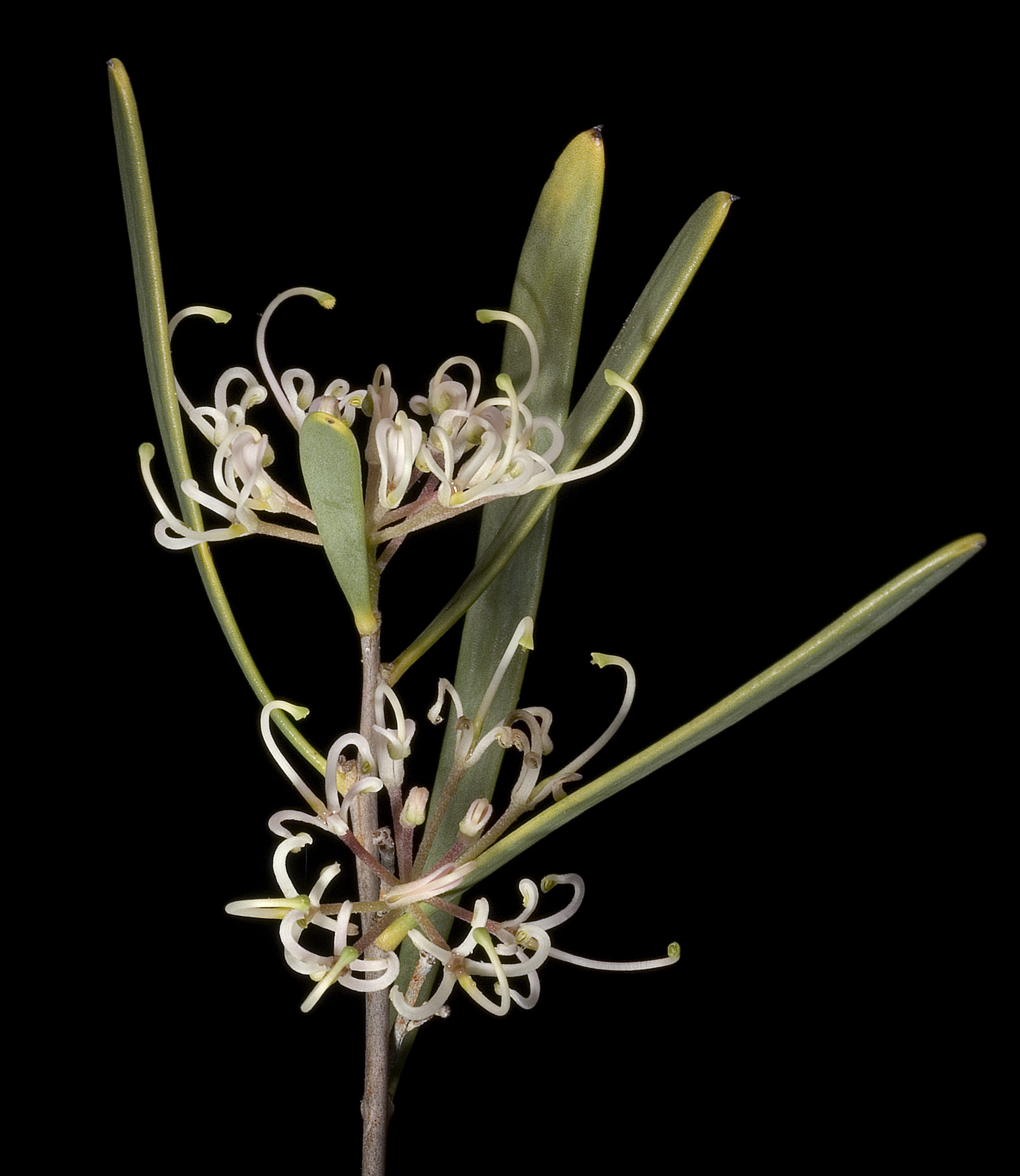

Scientific classification
- Kingdom: Plantae
- Clade: Tracheophytes
- Clade: Angiosperms
- Clade: Eudicots
- Order: Proteales
- Family: Proteaceae
- Genus: Hakea
- Species: H. stenophylla

Binomial name
- Hakea stenophylla A.Cunn. ex R.Br.
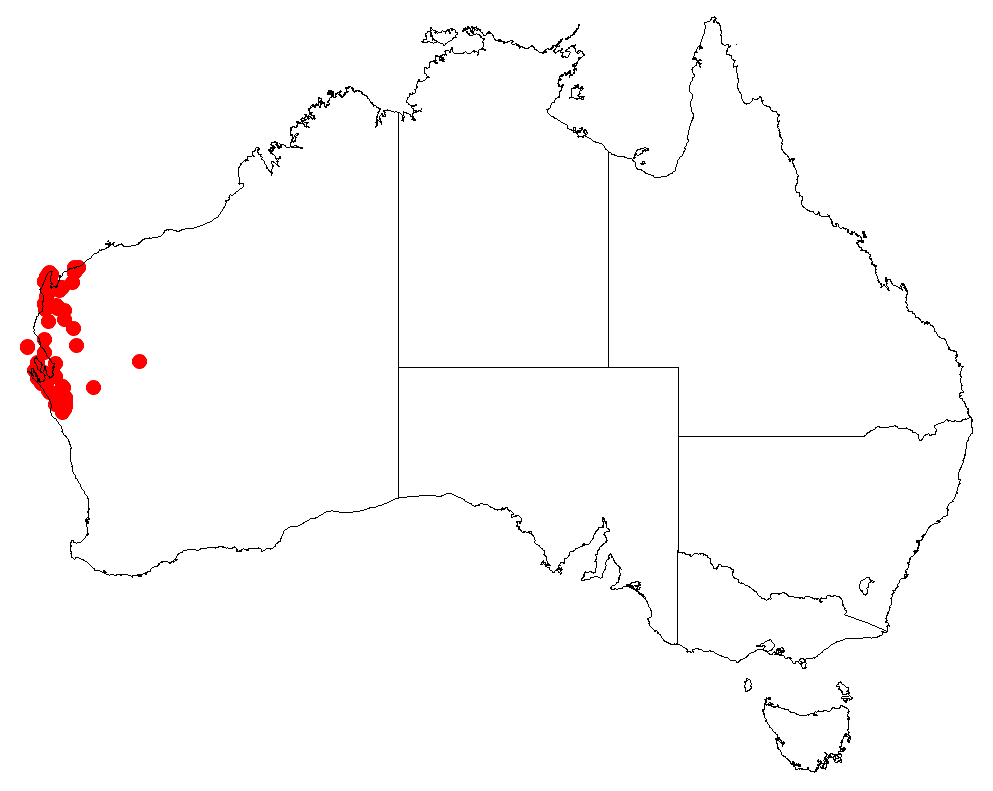
- Occurrence data from Australasian Virtual Herbarium

= Hakea stenophylla =

Species of plant endemic to Western Australia

Hakea stenophylla is a shrub or tree in the family Proteaceae, with sweetly scented creamy-white flowers. It is endemic to Western Australia.

== Description ==
Hakea stenophylla is a spreading shrub or tree typically growing to 5 metres (16 ft) high with more or less smooth, dark bark. The branchlets are thickly covered with flattened, soft white hairs, occasionally rusty coloured. The surface quickly becoming smooth. The grey-green leaves are linear to narrowly egg-shaped 6 to 12 centimetres (2.4 to 4.7 in) long and 1 to 4 millimetres (0.039 to 0.157 in) wide. The leaves are initially thickly covered with flattened, rusty coloured, smooth soft hairs quickly becoming smooth. The leaves taper abruptly to a short pointed hook at the apex. The inflorescence consists of 10 to 16 cream-white, sweetly scented flowers on a peduncle 2–9 mm (0.079–0.354 in) long that is densely covered with white, soft hairs. The individual flowers are on a stem 1–1.5 mm (0.039–0.059 in) long. The perianth 1.6 to 4 mm (0.063 to 0.157 in) long that is recurved to a claw. The pistil is 7 to 13 mm (0.28 to 0.51 in) long with a recurved style and an oblique pollen presenter. The woody fruit are elliptic or obliquely egg-shaped, 3 to 4.5 cm (1.2 to 1.8 in) long and 2 to 2.6 cm (0.8 to 1.0 in) wide, abruptly narrowing with an upright or recurved black beak. The seeds within are 17 to 23 mm (0.669 to 0.906 in) long and 9.5 to 16 mm (0.374 to 0.630 in) wide with a wing down one side of seed body.

== Taxonomy ==
The species was first formally described by Robert Brown in 1830 from an unpublished description by Allan Cunningham and Brown's description was published in Supplementum primum prodromi florae Novae Hollandiae. The specific epithet (stenophylla) is derived from the Greek stenos meaning "narrow" and phyllon meaning "leaf" referring to the shape of the leaves.

There are two recognized subspecies:

- Hakea stenophylla subsp. notialis R.M.Barker A spreading shrub up to 2 m (6 ft 7 in) high.
- Hakea stenophylla R.Br. subsp. stenophylla An erect small tree or shrub to 4 m (13 ft) high.

Both subspecies are also distinguished by their differing fruit valve thickness.

== Distribution ==
Hakea stenophylla is endemic to an area in the Mid West and the Gascoyne regions of Western Australia where it is found on sandplains and among coastal sand dunes where it grows in sandy and loamy soils often around limestone usually with spinifex.
