= Hakea recurva subsp. arida =

Scientific classification
- Kingdom: Plantae
- Clade: Tracheophytes
- Clade: Angiosperms
- Clade: Eudicots
- Order: Proteales
- Family: Proteaceae
- Genus: Hakea
- Species: H. recurva
- Subspecies: H. r. subsp. arida

Trinomial name
- Hakea recurva subsp. arida (Diels) W.R.Barker & R.M.Barker

Subspecies of flowering plant

Hakea recurva subsp. arida is a plant in the family Proteaceae endemic to the south-west of Western Australia.

== Description ==
An erect dense shrub 1.7–5 m (6–20 ft) high with smooth to rough grey bark. Terete dark green leaves are thick and rigid 2.5–4 cm (1–2 in) long and 1.2–1.6 mm (0.05–0.06 in) wide ending with a very sharp point 2.8–4.5 mm (0.1–0.2 in) long. They may be straight or have an upward curve. Profuse white-cream fragrant flowers appear in dense clusters in the leaf axils. The fruit are 0.7–1 cm (0.3–0.4 in) wide, egg-shaped with a smooth to slightly rough surface ending with a small pointed beak.

== Taxonomy and naming ==
This hakea was first formally described in 1904 by Ludwig Diels who gave it the name Hakea arida and published the description in Botanische Jahrbücher für Systematik, Pflanzengeschichte und Pflanzengeographie. In 1999, William Barker and Robyn Barker changed the name to Hakea recurva subsp. arida. Named from the Latin aridus 'dry', referring to the semi-arid area where it grows.

== Distribution and habitat ==
Grows inland from Mount Augustus south to Wubin on sandstone slopes, river banks, flats in sand, loam and stony soils with quartzite and laterite. An ornamental frost tolerant species requiring full sun and good drainage. A good habitat plant for wildlife due to its dense prickly growth habit.

== Conservation status ==
Hakea recurva subsp. arida is classified as "not threatened" by the Western Australian Government Department of Parks and Wildlife.
