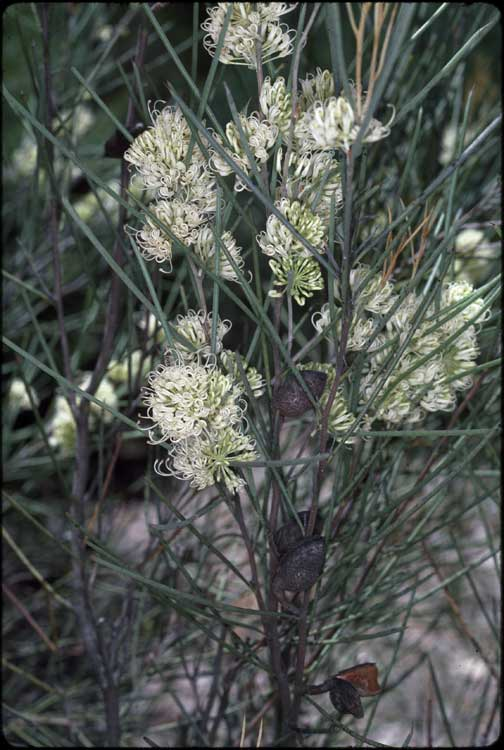

Scientific classification
- Kingdom: Plantae
- Clade: Tracheophytes
- Clade: Angiosperms
- Clade: Eudicots
- Order: Proteales
- Family: Proteaceae
- Genus: Hakea
- Species: H. leucoptera R.Br.
- Subspecies: H. l. subsp. leucoptera

Trinomial name
- Hakea leucoptera subsp. leucoptera

Synonyms
- Hakea virgata R.Br.; Hakea stricta F.Muell. ex Meisn.; Hakea florigera Gand.; Hakea leucoptera var. kippistiana (Meisn.) F.Muell. ex J.M.Black; Hakea kippistiana Meisn.

= Hakea leucoptera subsp. leucoptera =

Needlebush

Subspecies of flowering plant

Hakea leucoptera subsp. leucoptera commonly known as silver needlewood, needlewood, needle bush, needle hakea or kulua, is a shrub or small tree with cylinder-shaped leaves, white or cream flowers, white, woolly hairs on the flower stalks and grows in Queensland, New South Wales, South Australia, Victoria and the Northern Territory.

== Description ==
Hakea leucoptera subsp. leucoptera is tree or shrub 1–8 m (3 ft 3 in – 26 ft 3 in) high, usually upright with an open crown. Leaves are arranged alternately, stiff, terete, 3.5–10 cm (1.4–3.9 in) long, 1.3–2 m (4 ft 3 in – 6 ft 7 in) wide, hairy, grey-green and ending a sharp point. Whit or cream flowers are borne clusters of 18-45 on a pedicel 2–6.5 cm (0.79–2.56 in) long. Flowering occurs from late spring to summer and the fruit is a woody capsule 17–32 mm (0.67–1.26 in) long, mostly smooth, occasionally warty and tapering to a narrow beak.

== Taxonomy and naming ==
Hakea leucoptera was first formally described in 1810 by Robert Brown and the description was published in Transactions of the Linnean Society of London. In 1996 William Baker described two subspecies of H. leucoptera including this subspecies and subspecies sericipes.The specific epithet (leucoptera) means 'winged' in reference to the seed.

== Distribution and habitat ==
It is found in western New South Wales, north-western Victoria, South Australia and the Northern Territory. It grows in grassland, shrubland and woodland.
