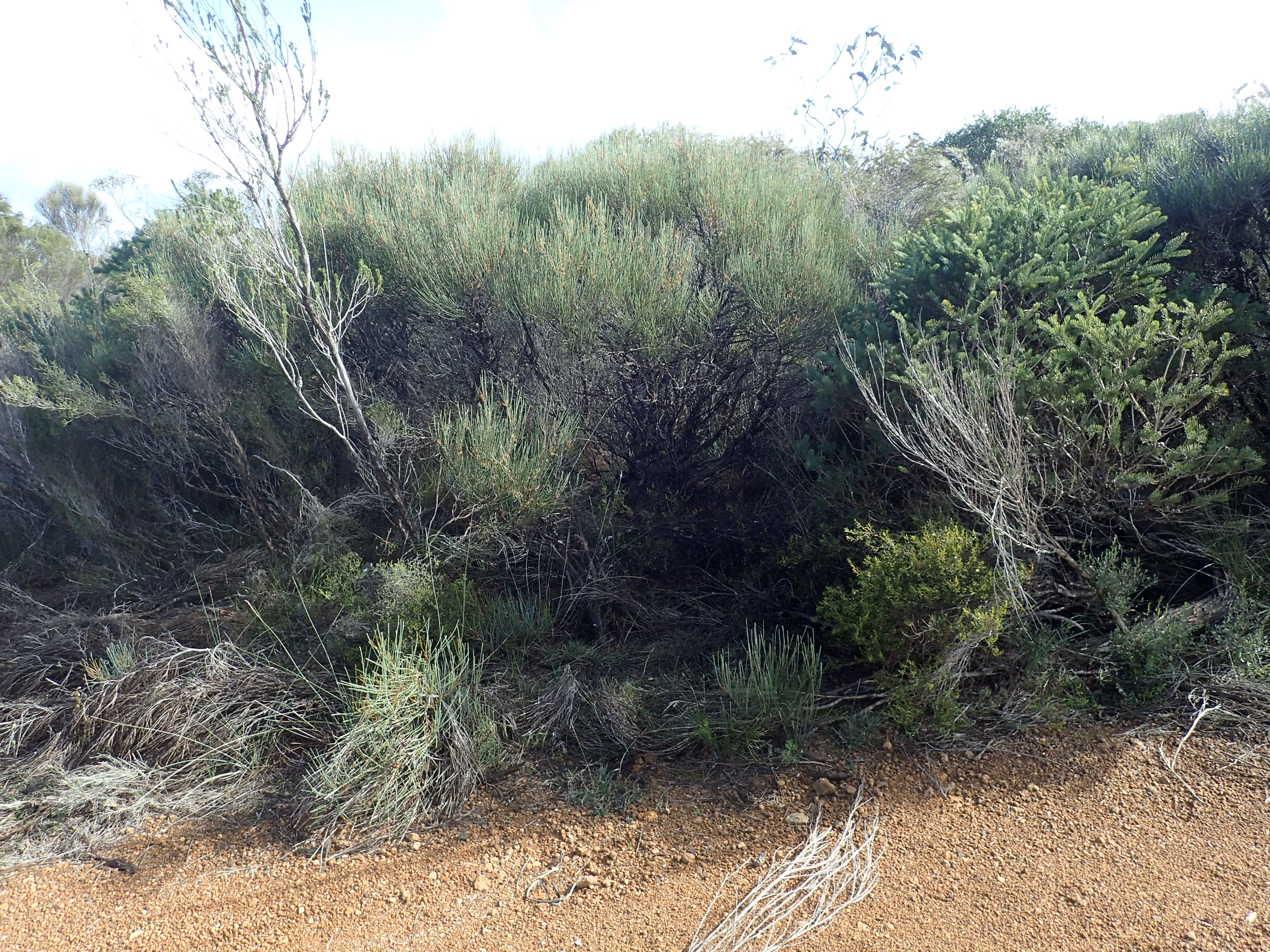
- Hakea bicornata in the Mount Burdett Nature Reserve

Scientific classification
- Kingdom: Plantae
- Clade: Tracheophytes
- Clade: Angiosperms
- Clade: Eudicots
- Order: Proteales
- Family: Proteaceae
- Genus: Hakea
- Species: H. bicornata

Binomial name
- Hakea bicornata R.M.Barker
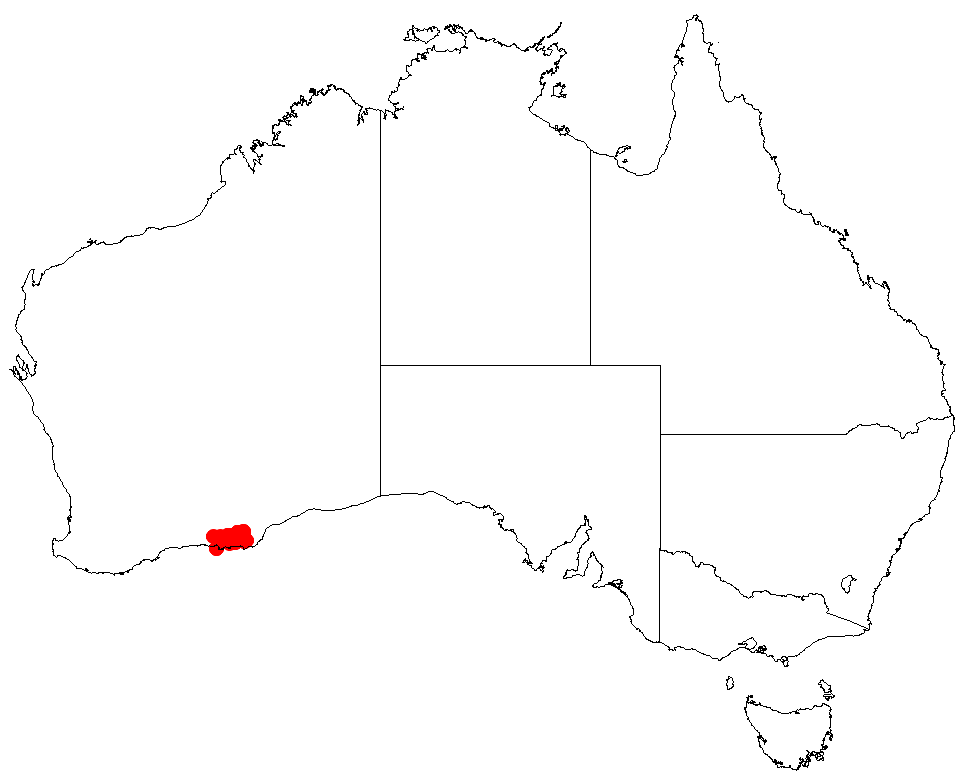
- Occurrence data from Australasian Virtual Herbarium

= Hakea bicornata =

Species of shrub native to Western Australia

Hakea bicornata is a shrub in the family Proteaceae native to Western Australia, with attractive creamy-white flowers and fruit with two distinctive horns.

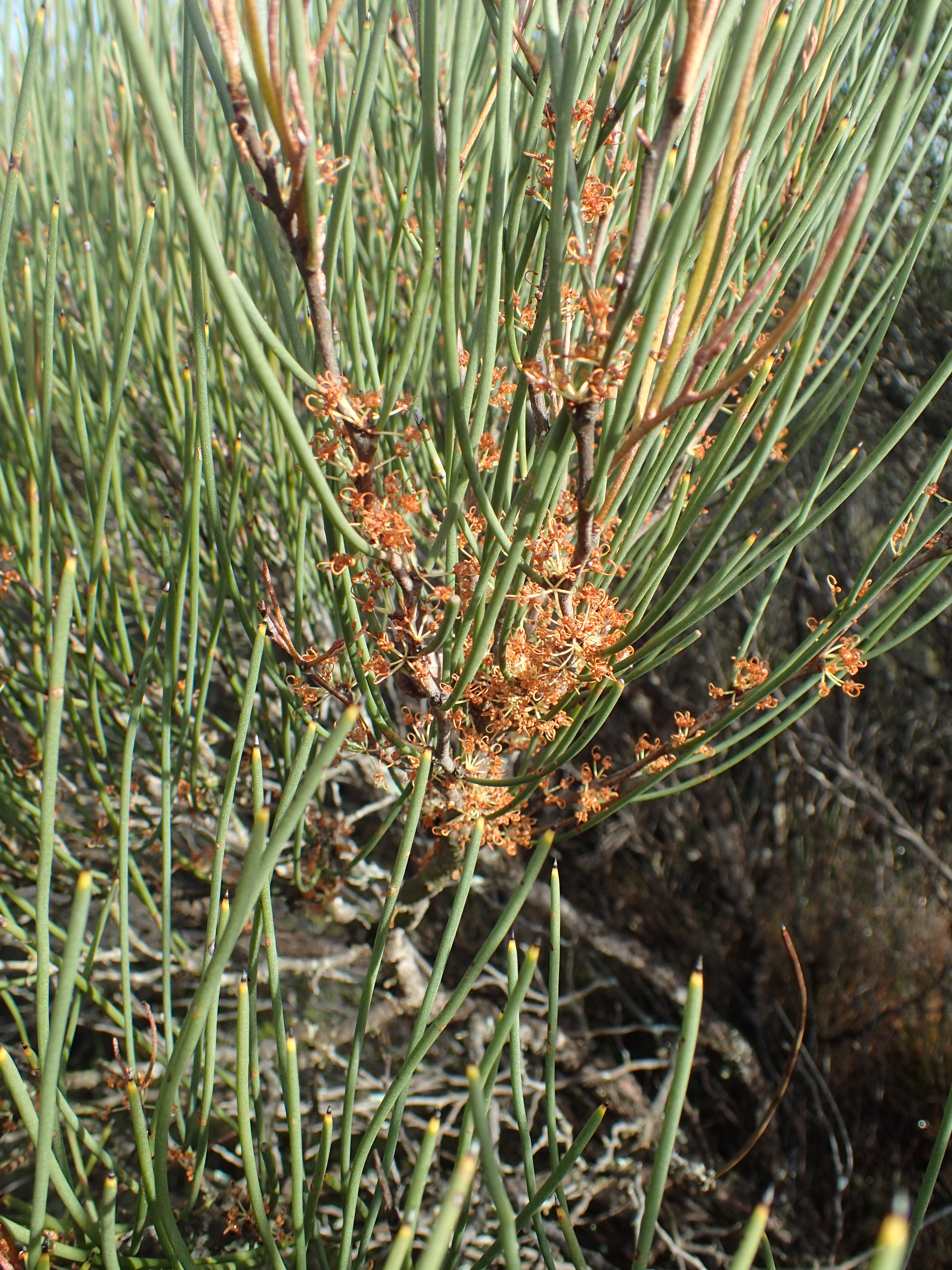
Foliage and (old) flowers

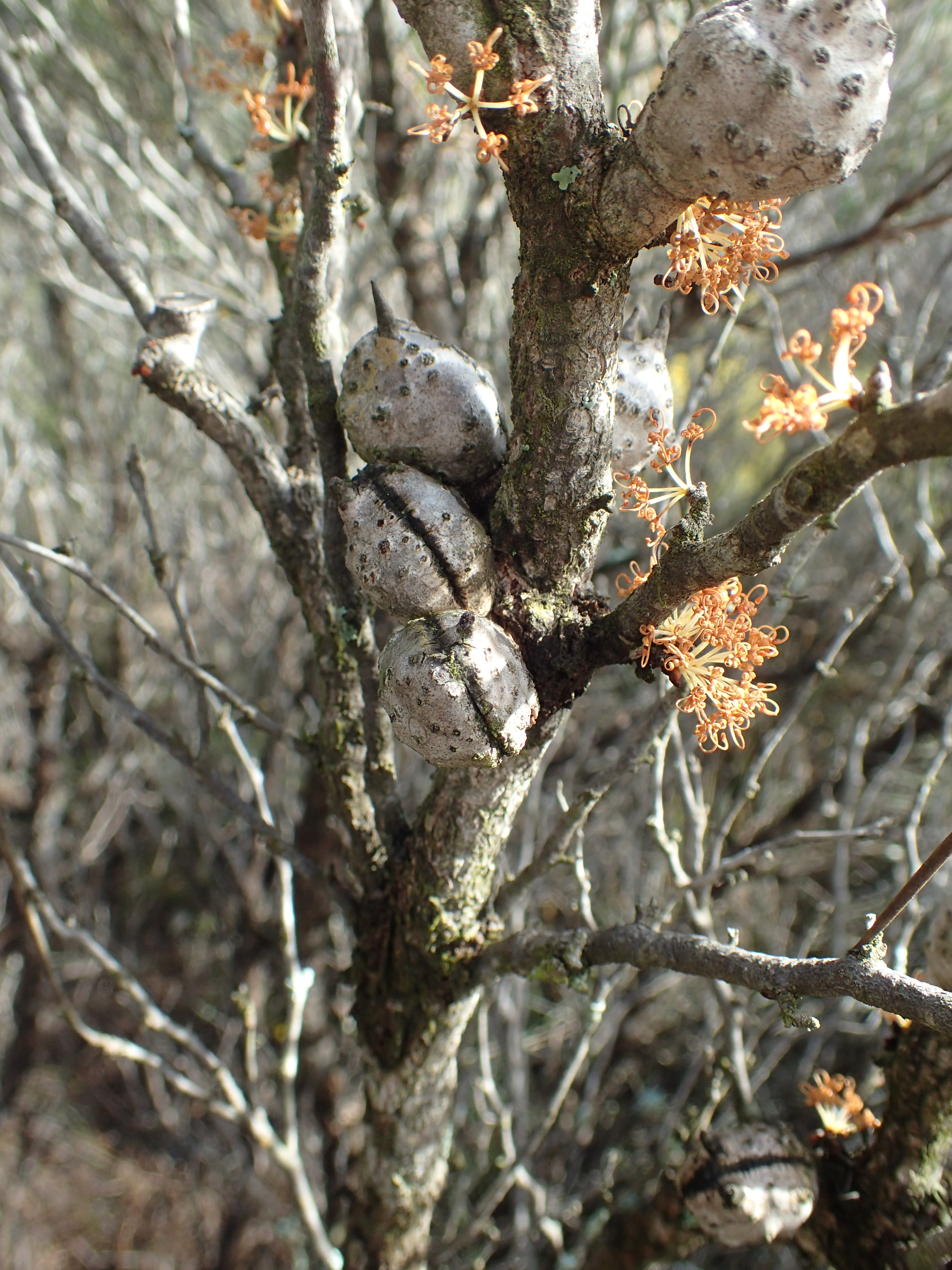
Fruit (slightly damaged)

== Description ==
Hakea bicornata is a lignotuberous, multiple stemmed shrub 0.8 to 2 metres (2.6 to 6.6 ft) high. The many smaller branches are rusty coloured and covered with small hairs. The simple rust coloured leaves grow alternately along the stem; they are 7 to 13 centimetres (2.8 to 5.1 in) long and 1.2 to 1.5 millimetres (0.047 to 0.059 in) wide, ending in a point 1.5–2.5 mm (0.06–0.1 in) long. The young leaves are densely covered in matted silky hairs but become smooth as they mature. It produces cream-white to yellow flowers from April to May and occasionally August. Each inflorescence is composed of eight cream-white to yellow flowers on an obscure stem. The perianth is cream-white about 2.5 mm (0.098 in) long. The pistil is about 4 mm (0.157 in) long with an oblique conical pollen presenter. Fruit are oval to egg-shaped 15 to 22 mm (0.59 to 0.87 in) long and 12 to 15 mm (0.472 to 0.591 in) wide with a pair of distinctive narrow horns 5 to 6 mm (0.197 to 0.236 in) long. The fruit are pale grey with black blister-like protuberances. The dark brown to black egg-shaped seeds have a wing down one side.

== Taxonomy and naming ==
Hakea bicornata was first formally described by botanist R.M.Barker in 1990 as part of the work New species, new combinations and other name changes in Hakea (Proteaceae) as published in Journal of the Adelaide Botanic Gardens. The specific epithet (bicornata) is derived from the Latin prefix bi- meaning "two" or "twice" and the word cornu meaning "horn", referring to the prominent horns on the fruit.

== Distribution and habitat ==
Hakea bicornata is found in coastal areas along the south coast Goldfields-Esperance region of Western Australia between Esperance and Cape Arid National Park in lateritic sandy-loamy soils over granite as part of shrub-land communities.

== Conservation status ==
Hakea bicornata is classified as "not threatened" by the Western Australian Government Department of Parks and Wildlife.
