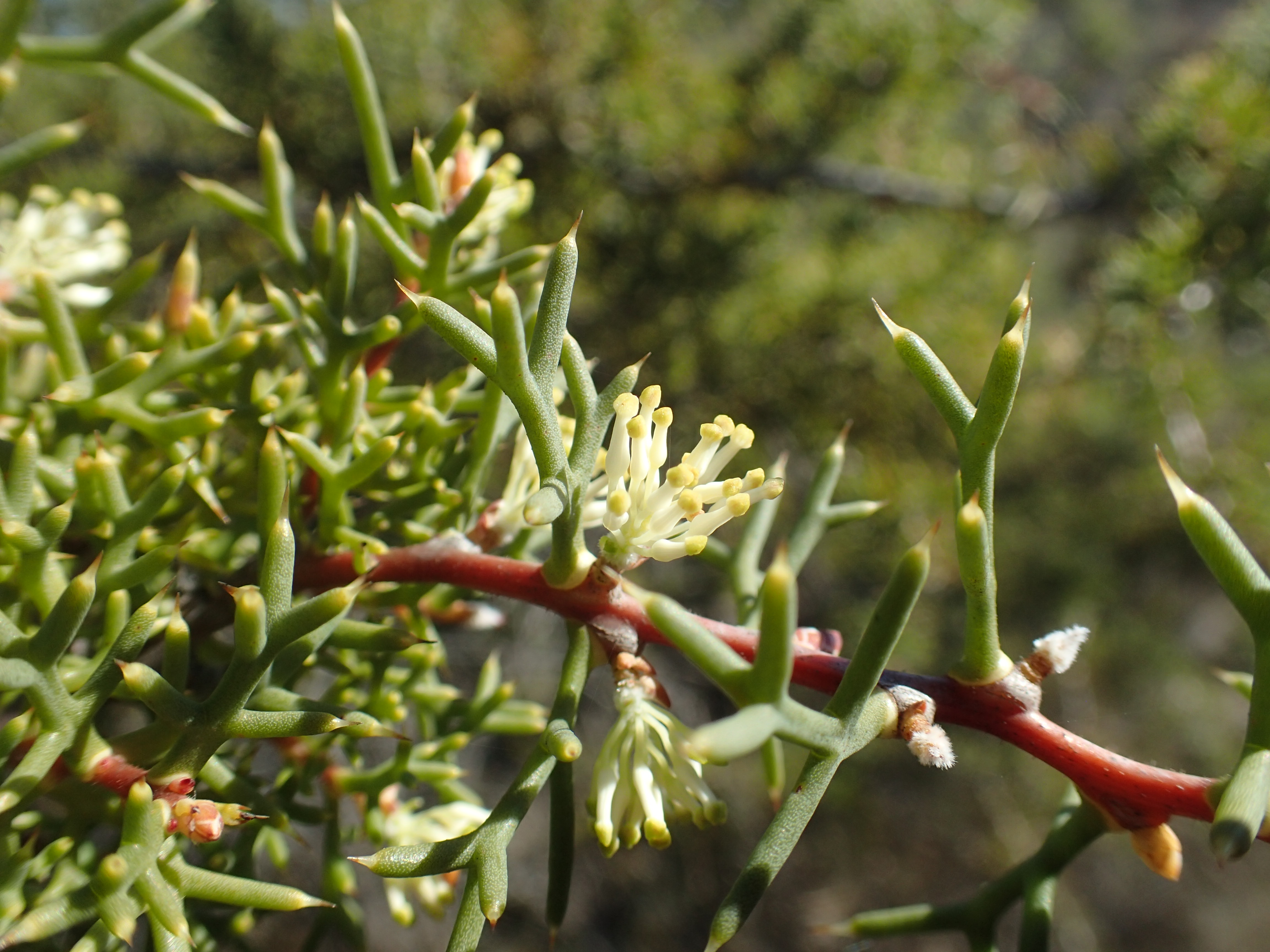
- Flowers and flower buds of Hakea horrida

Scientific classification
- Kingdom: Plantae
- Clade: Tracheophytes
- Clade: Angiosperms
- Clade: Eudicots
- Order: Proteales
- Family: Proteaceae
- Genus: Hakea
- Species: H. horrida

Binomial name
- Hakea horrida R.M.Barker
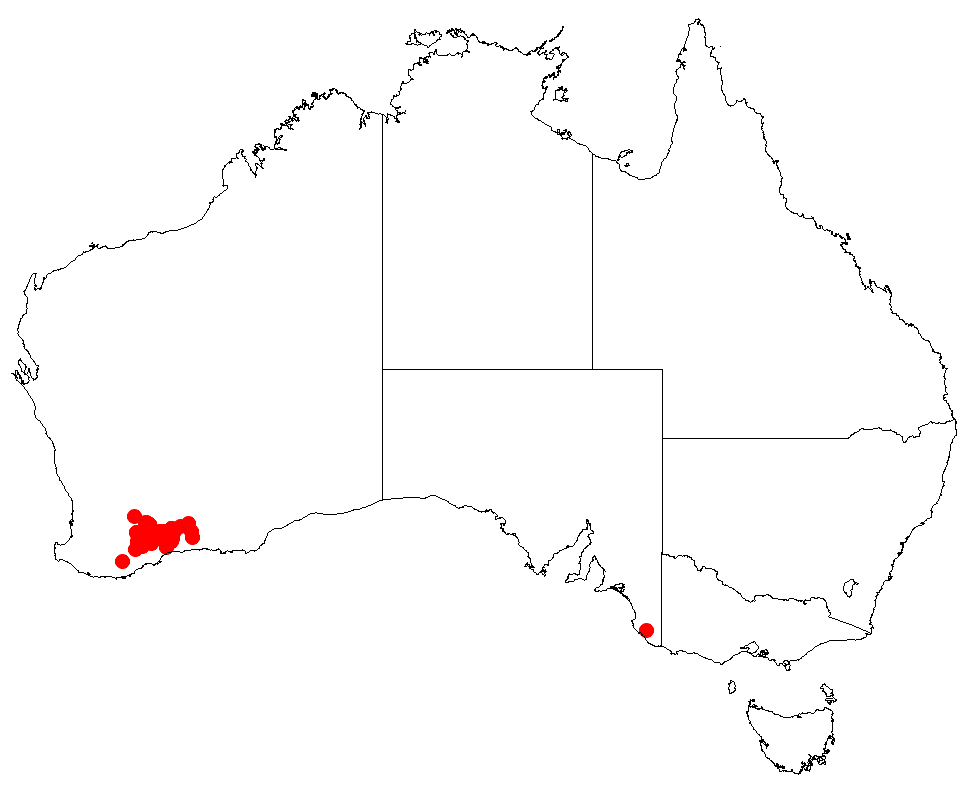
- Occurrence data from AVH

= Hakea horrida =

Species of shrub endemic to Western Australia

Hakea horrida is a shrub in the family Proteaceae and is endemic to an area in the Wheatbelt, Great Southern and Goldfields–Esperance regions of Western Australia. It is a small dense shrub, extremely prickly with large creamy white scented flowers.

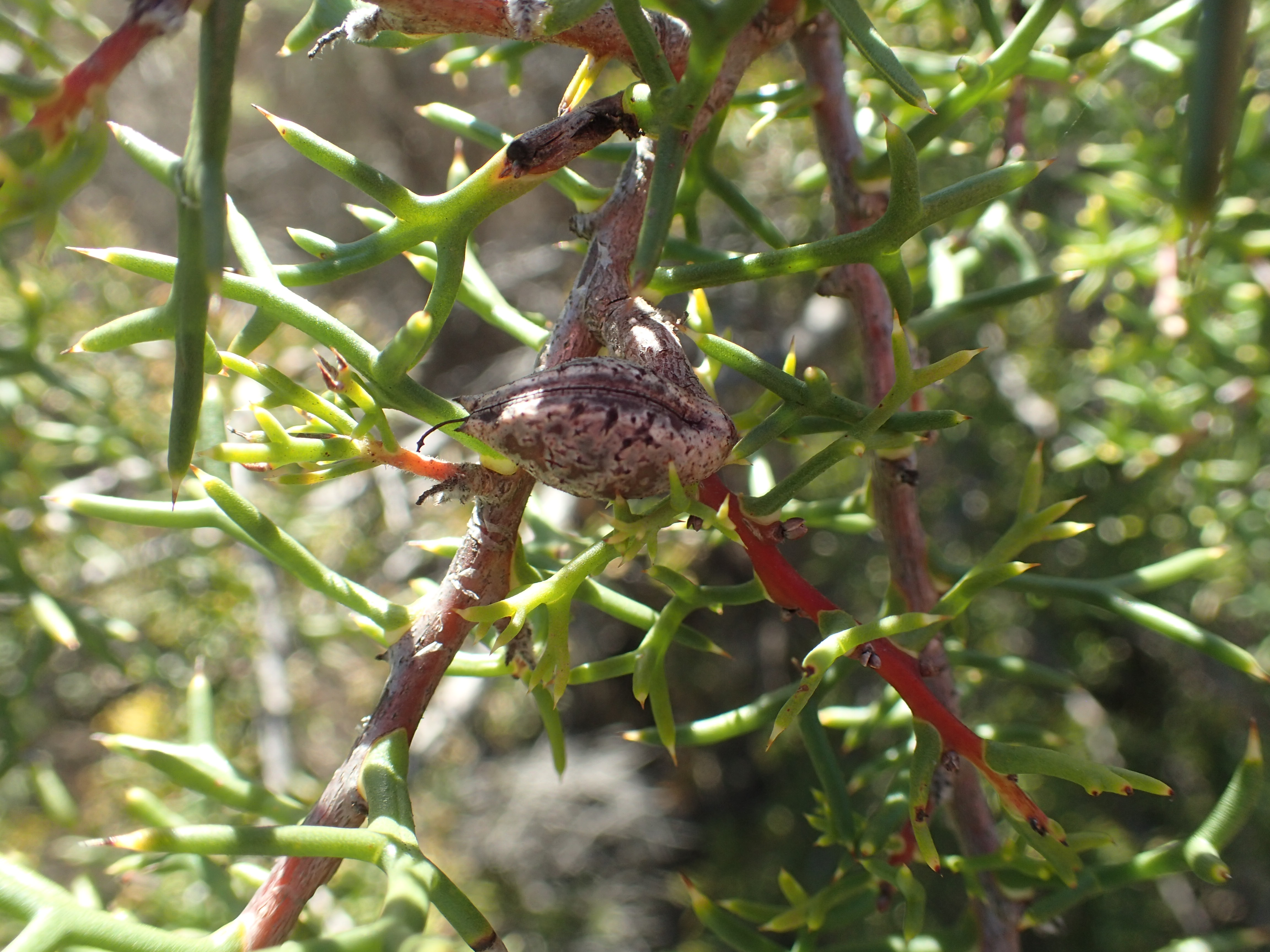
Leaves and fruit

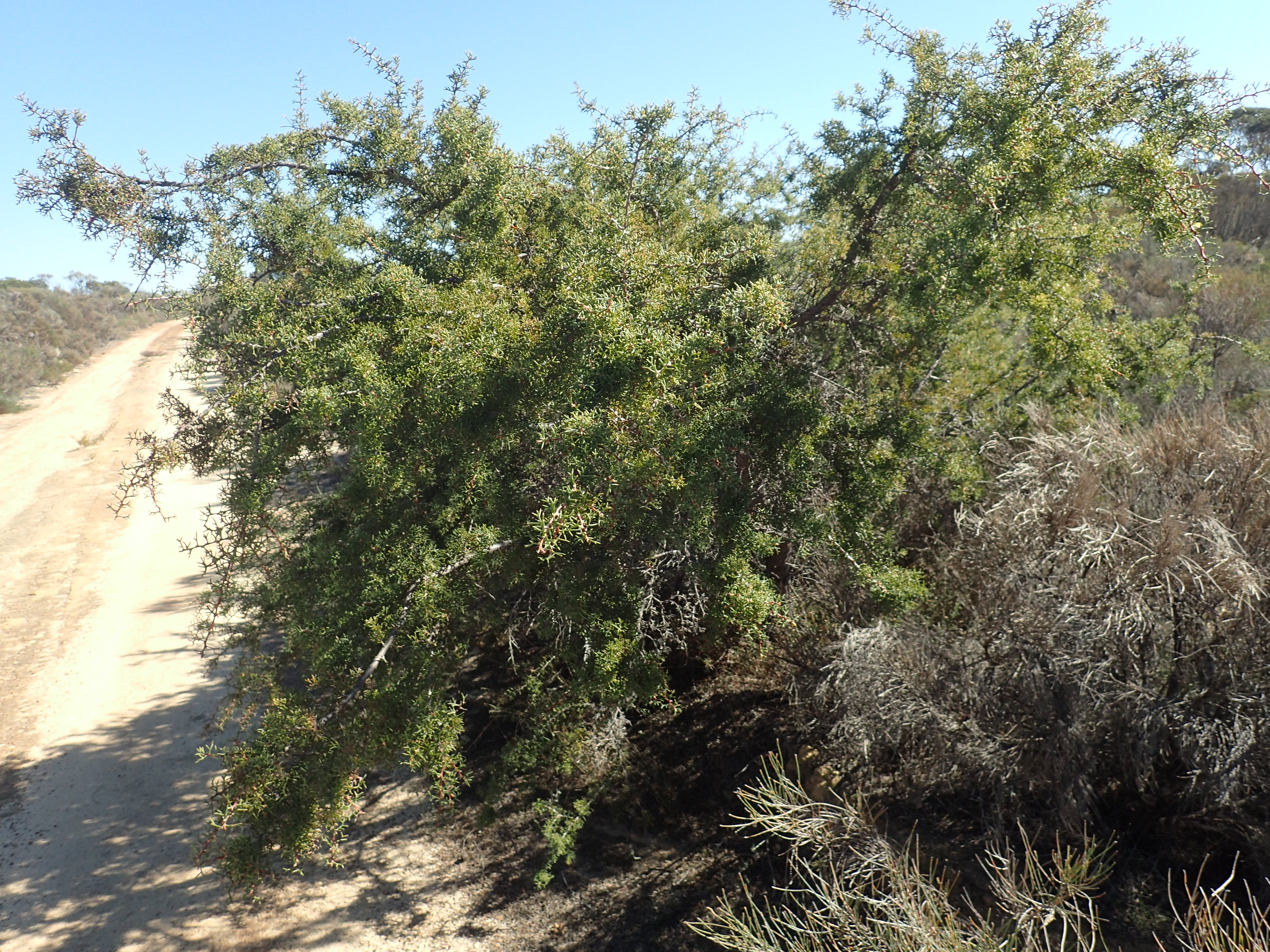
Habit, near Mount Madden, south-east of Lake King

== Description ==
The intricately branched spreading shrub typically grows to a height of 0.6 to 2 metres (2.0 to 6.6 ft). A very dense and impenetrable species due to its extremely prickly foliage. The leaves are rigid, 4–10 cm (2–4 in) long, prominently grooved and narrow with 5–7 sharply toothed lobes. It blooms from August to October and produces large scented white to cream flowers in clusters in the leaf axils. They may appear in a raceme of up 22 flowers. The smooth to roughish fruit are ovoid 2 cm (0.8 in) long by 1.5 cm (0.6 in) wide with two distinct slightly incurving beaks.

== Taxonomy and naming ==
This species was formally described by Robyn Mary Barker in 1990. It is named from the Latin horridus- prickly, referring to the extremely sharp point on the leaf.

== Distribution and habitat ==
Hakea horrida grows from Kondinin south to Lake Grace and east to Esperance in heath and scrubland on sandy-loam with lateritic gravel.

== Conservation status ==
Hakea horrida is classified as "not threatened" by the Western Australian Government.
