= Hakea oligoneura =

Conservation status
- Priority Four — Rare Taxa (DEC)

Scientific classification
- Kingdom: Plantae
- Clade: Tracheophytes
- Clade: Angiosperms
- Clade: Eudicots
- Order: Proteales
- Family: Proteaceae
- Genus: Hakea
- Species: H. oligoneura

Binomial name
- Hakea oligoneura K.A.Sheph. & R.M. Barker

Species of shrub endemic to Western Australia

Hakea oligoneura is a small rare shrub known from only a few populations south of Perth, Western Australia growing exclusively on coastal limestone ridges. It has cream-white flowers and stiff, thick yellow-greenish leaves.

== Description ==
A small shrub 1.8–2 m (6–7 ft) high and up to 2 m (7 ft) wide with smooth bark or fine cracks at maturity. Smaller branches are cylindrical with dense white or rusty coloured hairs 0.2–0.4 mm (0.008–0.02 in) long and pressed against the stem becoming glabrous as they mature. Flat or rarely slightly inward curving leaves grow alternately along the stem. Narrowly lance-shaped, broader above the middle 21–68 mm (0.8–3 in) long and 4.5–10 mm (0.2–0.4 in) wide. The leaves are thin and stiff, with toothed thorny margins on the edges with 1-4 longitudinal veins. Fruit are 10–15 mm (0.4–0.6 in) long, 7–10 mm (0.3–0.4 in) wide and have small corky pyramid shaped projections on their surface.

== Taxonomy and naming ==
Hakea oligoneura was first formally described by Kelly Shepherd and Robyn Barker in 2009 and published in Nuytsia. The specific epithet (oligoneura) is said to be derived from the Greek oligo meaning "few" and neuron meaning "nerve", referring to the lack of prominent secondary veins in the leaves, distinguishing it from other closely related species. The proper word in ancient Greek for "few" is however oligos (ὀλίγος).

== Distribution and habitat ==
Hakea oligoneura has a restricted distribution known only in a few isolated populations in Yalgorup National Park between Mandurah and Bundbury along the Western Australian coast. Hakea oligoneura grows on limestone ridges in white-brown sand in open mallee scrubland.

== Conservation status ==
Hakea oligoneura is classified as "Priority Four" by the Government of Western Australia Department of Parks and Wildlife, meaning that is rare or near threatened, due to its restricted distribution.
