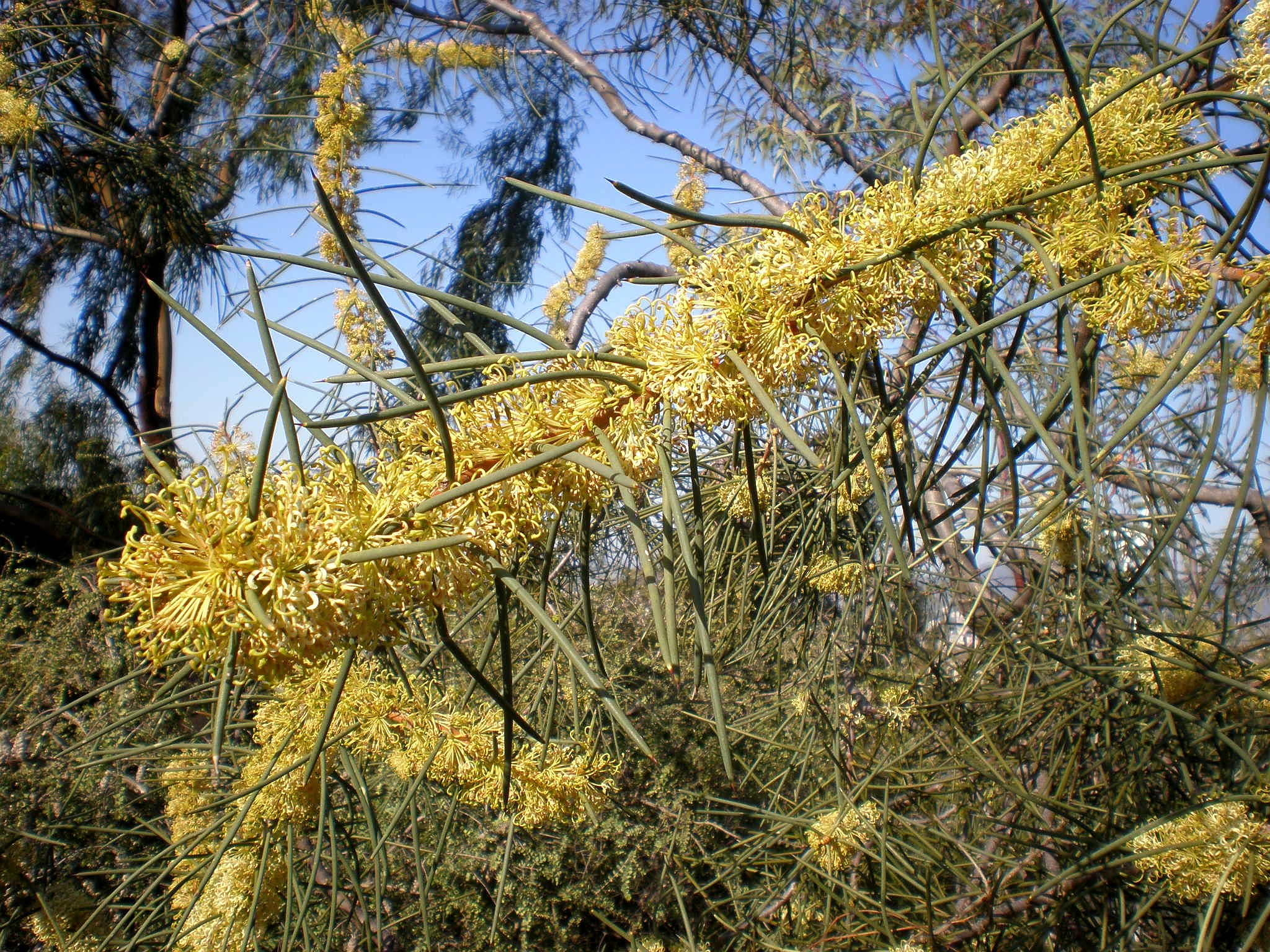
- Hakea recurva in the Botanic Garden of Barcelona

Scientific classification
- Kingdom: Plantae
- Clade: Tracheophytes
- Clade: Angiosperms
- Clade: Eudicots
- Order: Proteales
- Family: Proteaceae
- Genus: Hakea
- Species: H. recurva

Binomial name
- Hakea recurva Meisn.
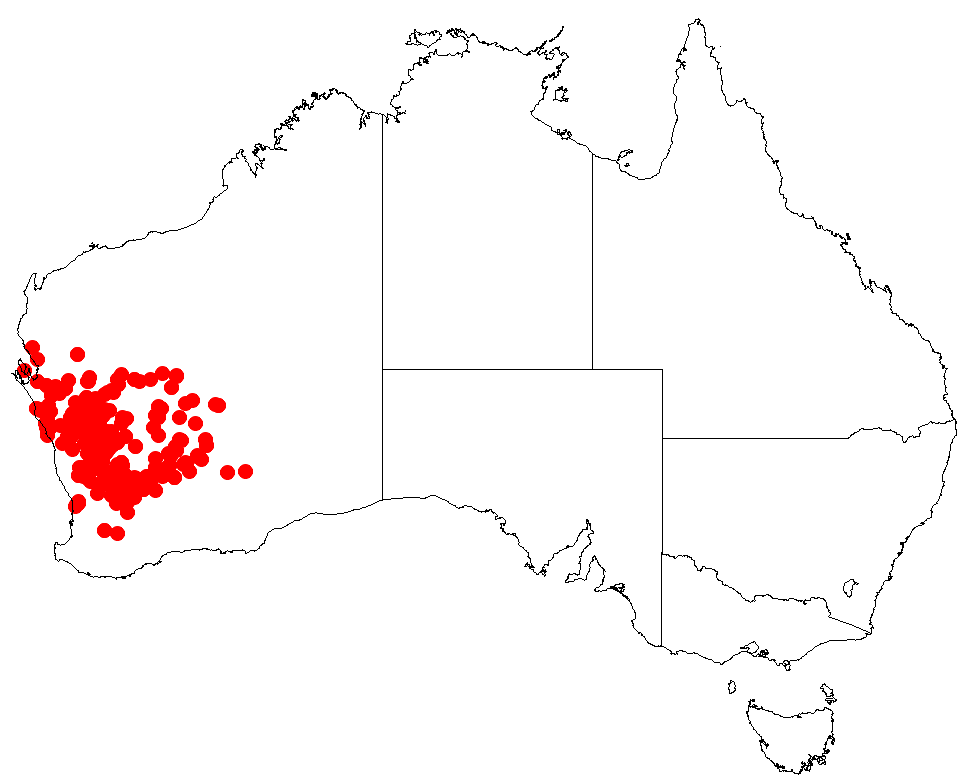
- Occurrence data from Australasian Virtual Herbarium

= Hakea recurva =

Jarnockmert

Species of plant endemic to Western Australia

Hakea recurva, commonly known as jarnockmert, is a flowering shrub or small tree in the family Proteaceae and is endemic to an area in the Mid West, northern Wheatbelt and the Goldfields-Esperance regions of Western Australia. It has creams-white to yellow flowers and thick, prickly, curved leaves.

== Description ==
Hakea recurva is a tall shrub or small tree typically growing to a height of 1 to 6 metres (3 to 20 ft) and does not form a lignotuber. It is multi-stemmed with branchlets densely covered in fine, flattened, silky hairs and quickly becoming smooth. The fragrant inflorescence may have 20-40 large cream-yellow flowers in clusters in the leaf axils. The leaves may be straight or recurved ending with a sharp point. Flowering occurs from June to October and the fruit have a smooth surface, obliquely egg-shaped 1.7–2.3 cm (0.7–0.9 in) long and ending in broad short beak.

== Taxonomy and naming ==
Hakea recurva was first formally described in 1856 by Carl Meisner and the description was published in Prodromus Systematis Naturalis Regni Vegetabilis. The specific epithet (recurva) means "curved", referring to the leaves.

== Distribution and habitat ==
Hakea recurva grows in open scrub or mulga on granitic loam, sand, sandy-clay, gravel and laterite. Occurs in area bounded by the Murchison River, Laverton and Israelite Bay.

There are two subspecies:

- Hakea recurva subsp. arida The leaves are generally 4 cm (1.6 in) long and 1.2–1.6 mm (0.047–0.063 in) wide. The overlapping flower bracts 2–3.5 mm (0.079–0.138 in) long, smooth, reddish coloured with a light brown rounded rim. The pedicels 4.5–8 mm (0.18–0.31 in) long and the gland 0.2 mm (0.0079 in) high.
- Hakea recurva subsp. recurva The leaves are 5–12 cm (2.0–4.7 in) long and 2–3.2 mm (0.079–0.126 in) wide. The over-lapping flower bracts 4–7.5 mm (0.16–0.30 in) long and pale coloured. The pedicels 8–13 mm (0.31–0.51 in) long and the gland 0.8–1 mm (0.031–0.039 in) high.
