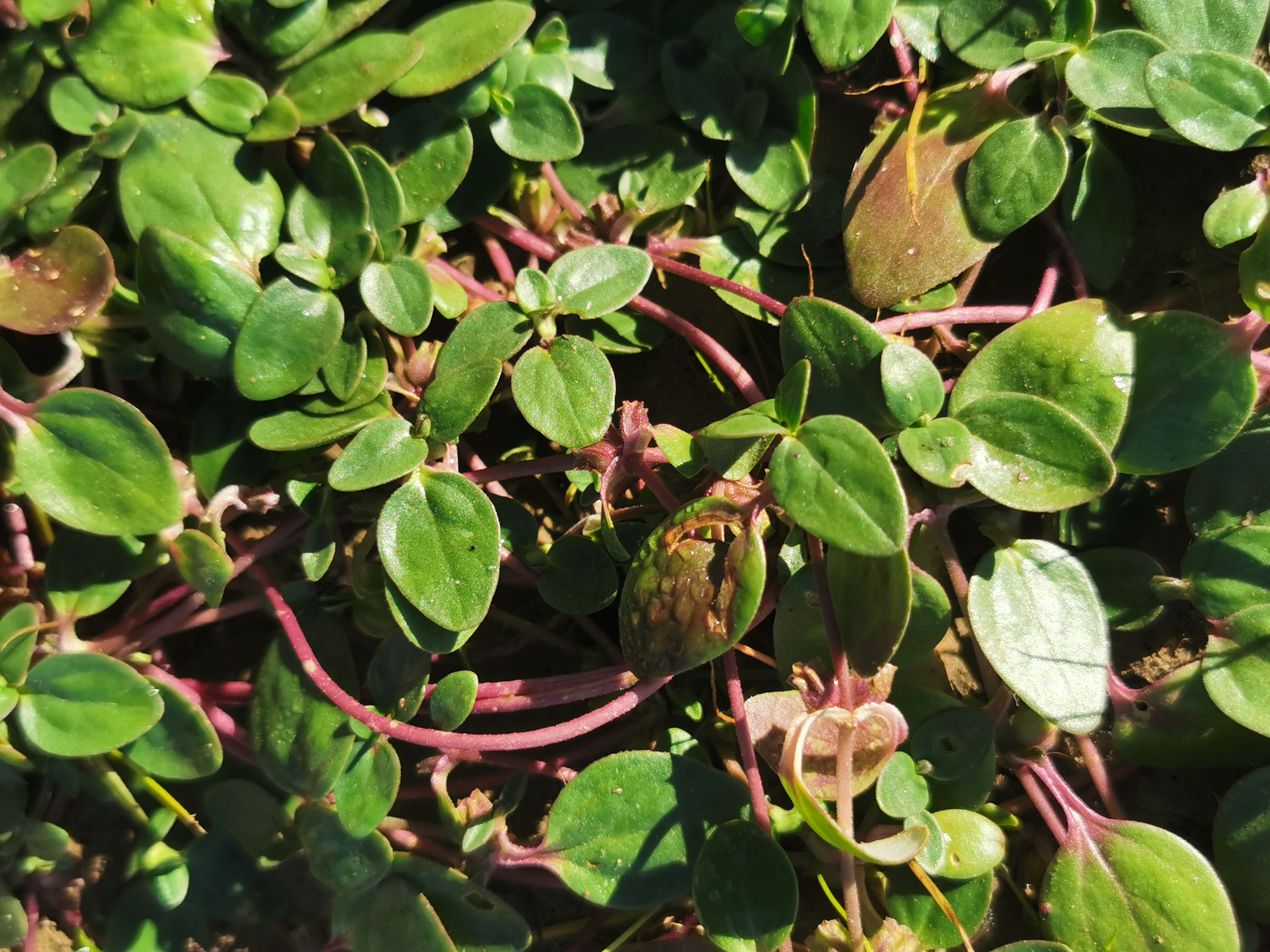
- Peplidium foecundum

Scientific classification
- Kingdom: Plantae
- Clade: Tracheophytes
- Clade: Angiosperms
- Clade: Eudicots
- Clade: Asterids
- Order: Lamiales
- Family: Phrymaceae
- Genus: Peplidium; Delile

= Peplidium =

Genus of plants

Peplidium is a genus of flowering plants belonging to the family Phrymaceae. Its native range is Egypt to Sinai, Indian subcontinent, and Australia.

The genus was first described by Alire Raffeneau Delile in 1813.

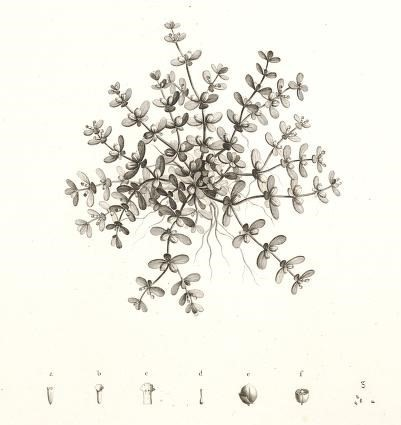
Peplidium maritimum as Peplidium humifusum

== Species ==
Species:

- Peplidium aithocheilum W.R.Barker
- Peplidium foecundum W.R.Barker
- Peplidium maritimum (L.f.) Asch.
- Peplidium muelleri Benth.
