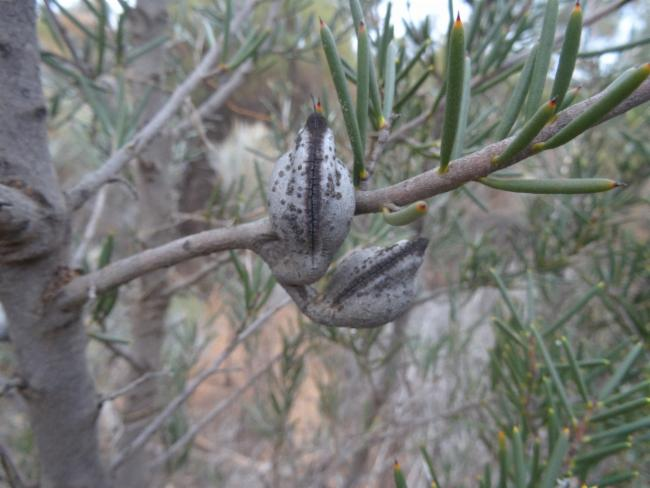

Conservation status
- Priority Three — Poorly Known Taxa (DEC)

Scientific classification
- Kingdom: Plantae
- Clade: Tracheophytes
- Clade: Angiosperms
- Clade: Eudicots
- Order: Proteales
- Family: Proteaceae
- Genus: Hakea
- Species: H. pendens

Binomial name
- Hakea pendens R.M.Barker
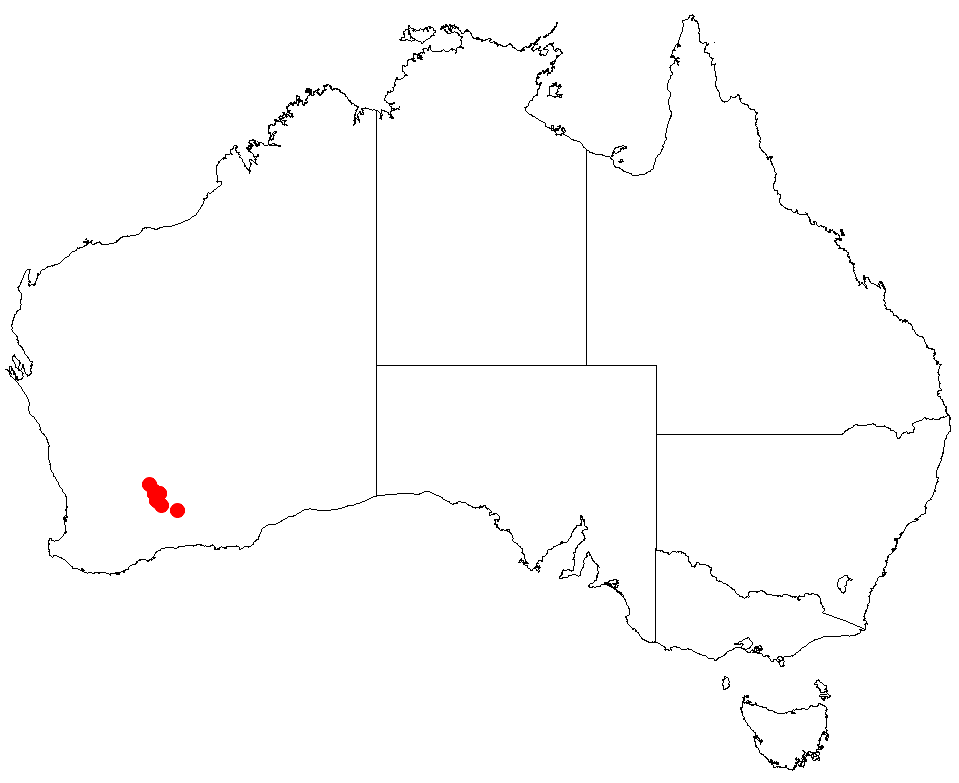
- Occurrence data from Australasian Virtual Herbarium

= Hakea pendens =

Species of shrub endemic to Western Australia

Hakea pendens is a flowering plant in the family Proteaceae and endemic to a small area in the Goldfields-Esperance regions of Western Australia. It is a small shrub with needle-like leaves and pendulous pink flowers.

== Description ==
Hakea pendens typically grows to 2 to 3 metres (7 to 10 ft) high and 2.5 to 3.1 metres (8 to 10 ft) wide. The branchlets are densely covered in silky, flattened hairs until flowering and then the surface becoming whitish and waxy. The terete, dark green leaves are 2–4 cm (0.8–2 in) long and about 2 mm (0.08 in) wide, crowded, stiff, and densely covered with silky, rusty coloured, flattened hairs, ending with a sharp point 2.5 mm (0.098 in) long. The inflorescence is a cluster of 6-8 pale pink pendulous flowers borne in leaf axils. Flowering occurs from August to September and the fruit is obovate, smooth, grey, sometimes with darker grey speckling and about 3 cm (1 in) long and 1.5–2 cm (0.6–0.8 in) wide.

== Taxonomy and naming ==
Hakea pendens was first formally described in 1990 by Robyn Mary Barker and the description was published in the Journal of the Adelaide Botanic Garden from a specimen collected near Marvel Loch. The specific epithet (pendens) means "hanging down", referring to the flower.

== Conservation status ==
Hakea pendens is classified as "Priority Three" by the Government of Western Australia Department of Parks and Wildlife meaning that it is poorly known and known from only a few locations but is not under imminent threat.
