= Point Boston, South Australia =

Point Boston South Australia
- Coordinates: 34.62°S 135.92°E
- Population: 62 (SAL 2021)
- Postcode(s): 5607
- Time zone: ACST (UTC+9:30)
  - Summer (DST): ACST (UTC+10:30)
- LGA(s): District Council of Lower Eyre Peninsula
- Region: Eyre Western
- County: Flinders
- State electorate(s): Flinders
- Federal division(s): Grey
Localities around Point Boston:
North Shields	Spencer Gulf	Spencer Gulf
North Shields	Point Boston	Spencer Gulf
Spencer Gulf	Spencer Gulf	Spencer Gulf

Point Boston is a locality in the Eyre and Western Region of South Australia, situated within the District Council of Lower Eyre Peninsula. It was formally established on 15 October 2009, when it was separated from North Shields; it is named after the geographical feature, which was named by Matthew Flinders in 1802.

The area is subject to a large master-planned residential development, which is overseen by the Point Boston Community Corporation. When completed, it will consist of four grouped settlements held under community title, each with approximately 250 residential lots. The first homeowners were given clearance to move in in December 2013, following prolonged delays associated with the initial developer having gone into receivership in 2010. Point Boston had previously been rezoned for rural 'lifestyle' development in the 1990s, but this had seen little takeup. A section of the locality had previously been used for sand mining; however, the mining lease has expired and the land is now being rehabilitated.

A function centre, The Peninsula, is located on Sullivan Drive. It won the Master Builder Award in South Australia for 2009. Sullivan Drive connects Lincoln Highway with the tip of Point Boston.
