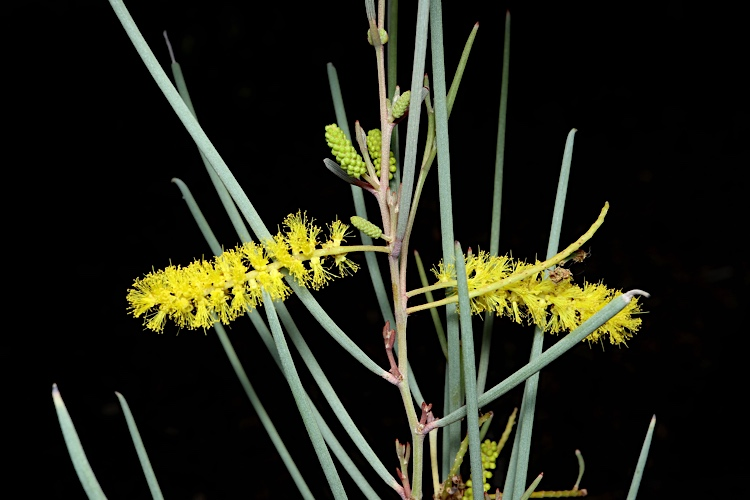
- In the Australian National Botanic Gardens

Scientific classification
- Kingdom: Plantae
- Clade: Embryophytes
- Clade: Tracheophytes
- Clade: Spermatophytes
- Clade: Angiosperms
- Clade: Eudicots
- Clade: Rosids
- Order: Fabales
- Family: Fabaceae
- Subfamily: Caesalpinioideae
- Clade: Mimosoid clade
- Genus: Acacia
- Species: A. palustris

Binomial name
- Acacia palustris Luehm.
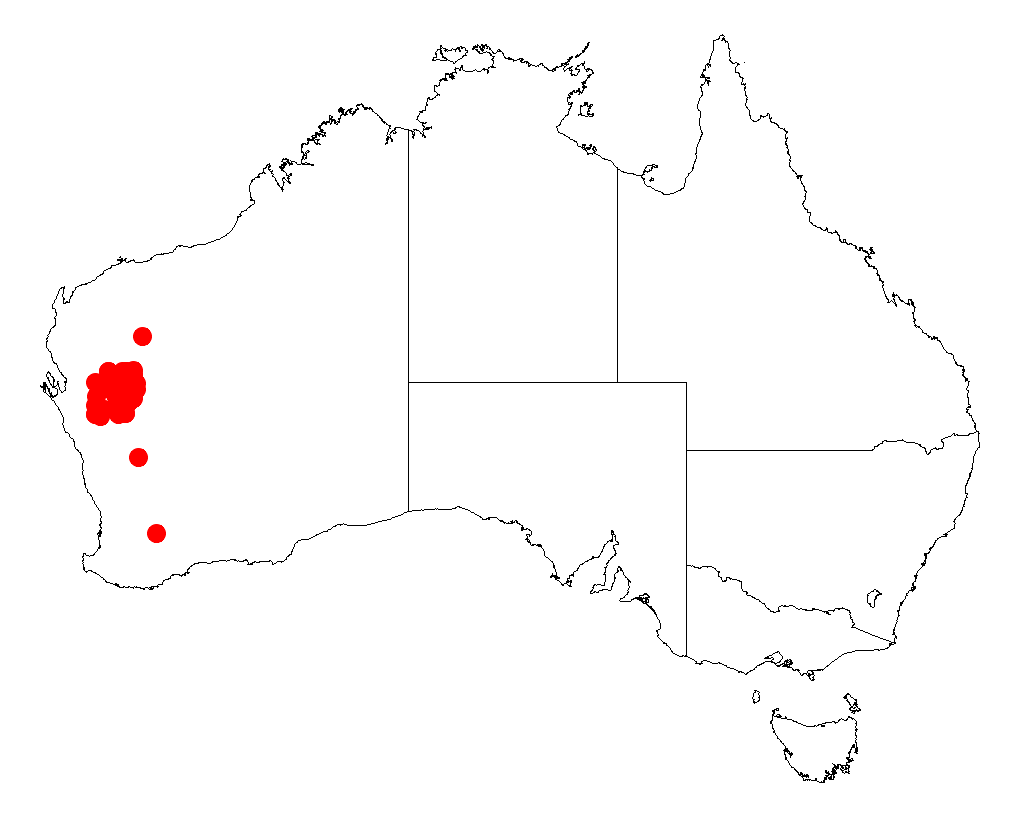
- Occurrence data from AVH

= Acacia palustris =

Needlewood

Species of legume

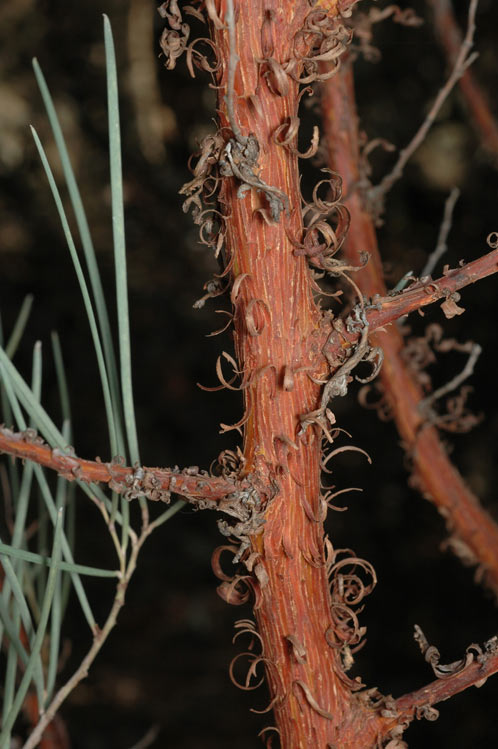
Bark

Acacia palustris, commonly known as needlewood, is a tree or shrub belonging to the genus Acacia and the subgenus Juliflorae that is native to an arid area of western Australia

== Description ==
The gnarled and pungent tree or shrub typically grows to a height of 2 to 4 metres (7 to 13 ft) and has glabrous branchlet. Like most species of Acacia it has phyllodes rather than true leaves. The vertically deflexed phyllodes tend to be terete and straight with a length of 9 to 22 cm (3.5 to 8.7 in) and a width of 1 to 1.5 mm (0.039 to 0.059 in). The long-tapering acuminate and glabrous phyllodes are quite rigid and pungent and have sixteen closely parallel and raised nerves.

== Distribution ==
It is native to Pilbara, Gascoyne and Mid West regions of Western Australia where it is known to grow in quartzite, and granitic soils and is often found along watercourses and swampy areas. It has a discontinuous distribution and is found from around Pingandy Station along the Ashburton River in the north down to around Murgoo Station and the Murchison River in the south where it is often situated on loamy alluvial plains as a part of shrubland communities where it is usually associated with Acacia aneura.

== See also ==
- List of Acacia species
