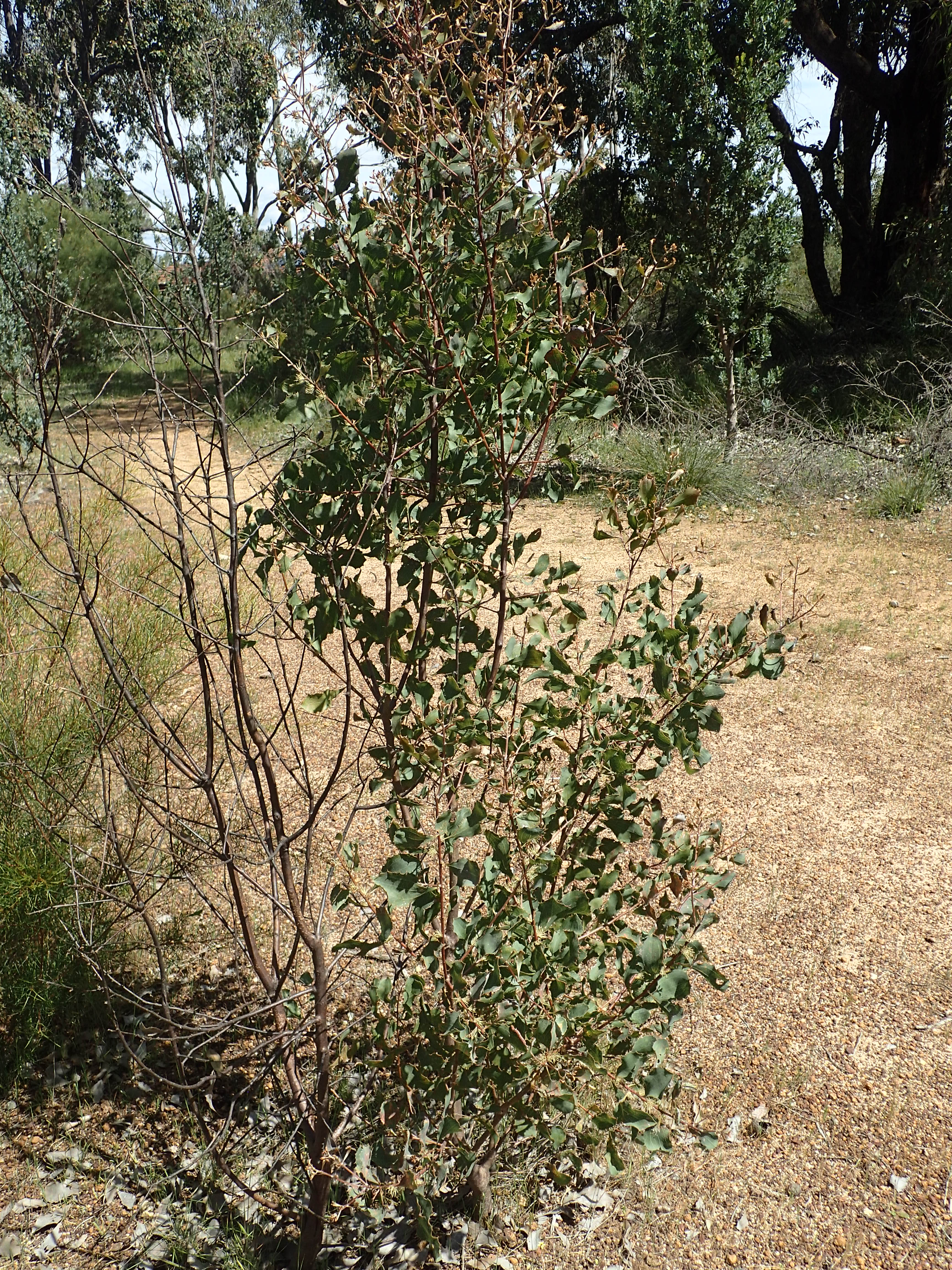
- In the Talbot Road Nature Reserve in Perth

Scientific classification
- Kingdom: Plantae
- Clade: Tracheophytes
- Clade: Angiosperms
- Clade: Eudicots
- Order: Proteales
- Family: Proteaceae
- Genus: Hakea
- Species: H. auriculata

Binomial name
- Hakea auriculata Meisn.
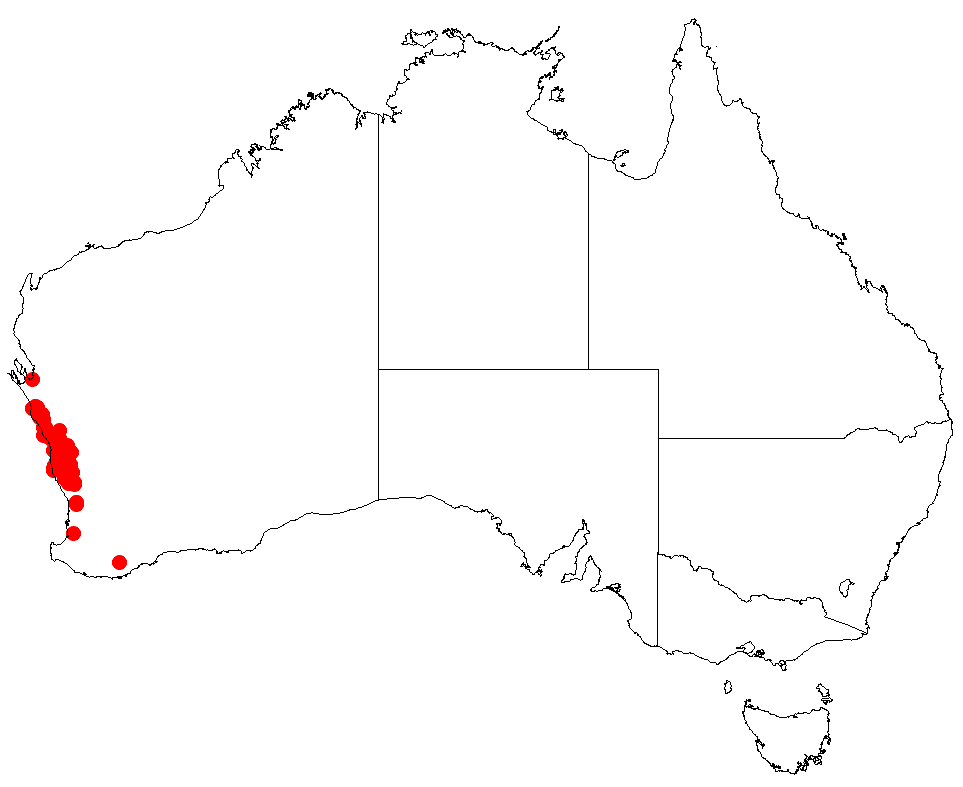
- Occurrence data from Australasian Virtual Herbarium

= Hakea auriculata =

Species of shrub endemic to Western Australia

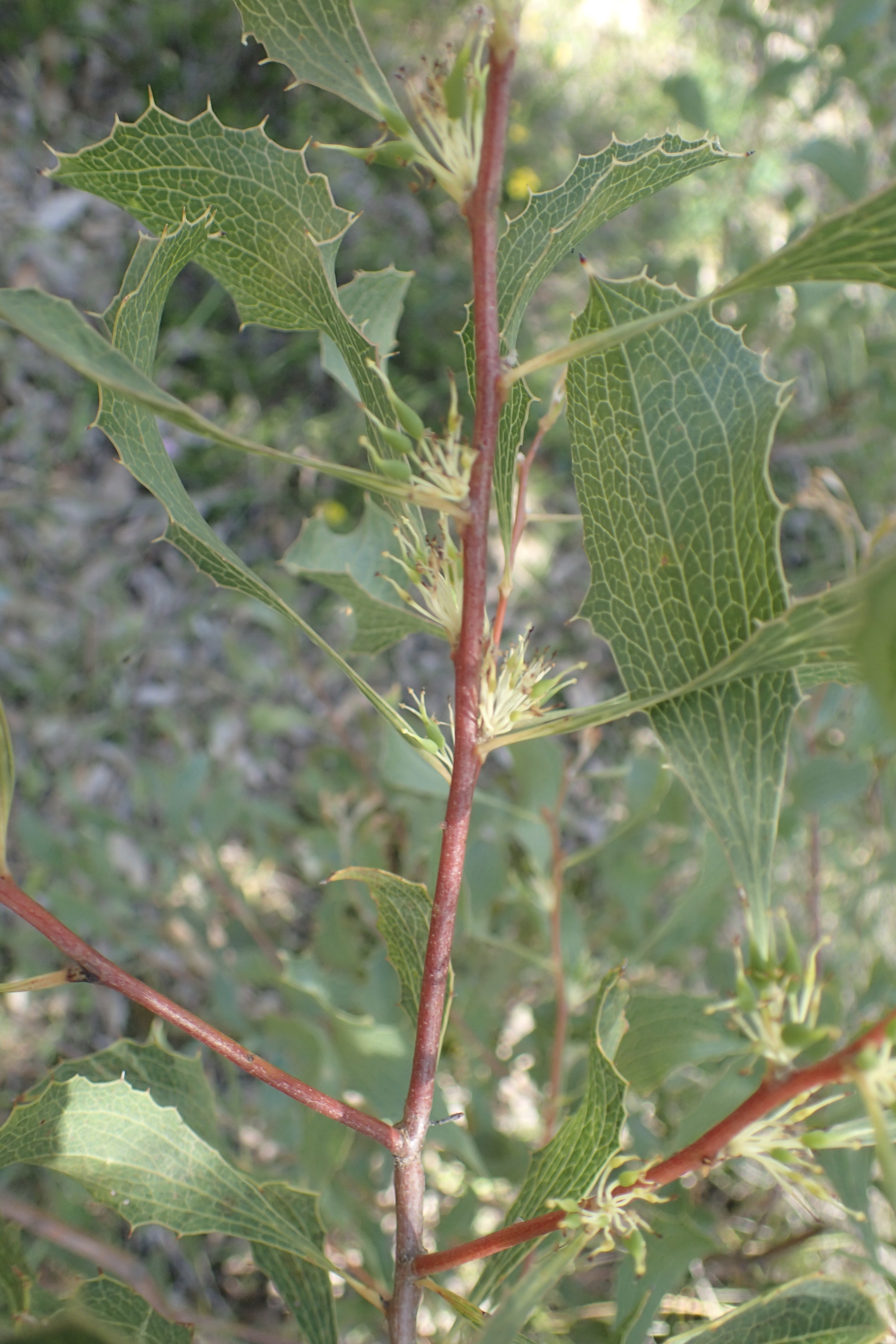
Foliage and flowers

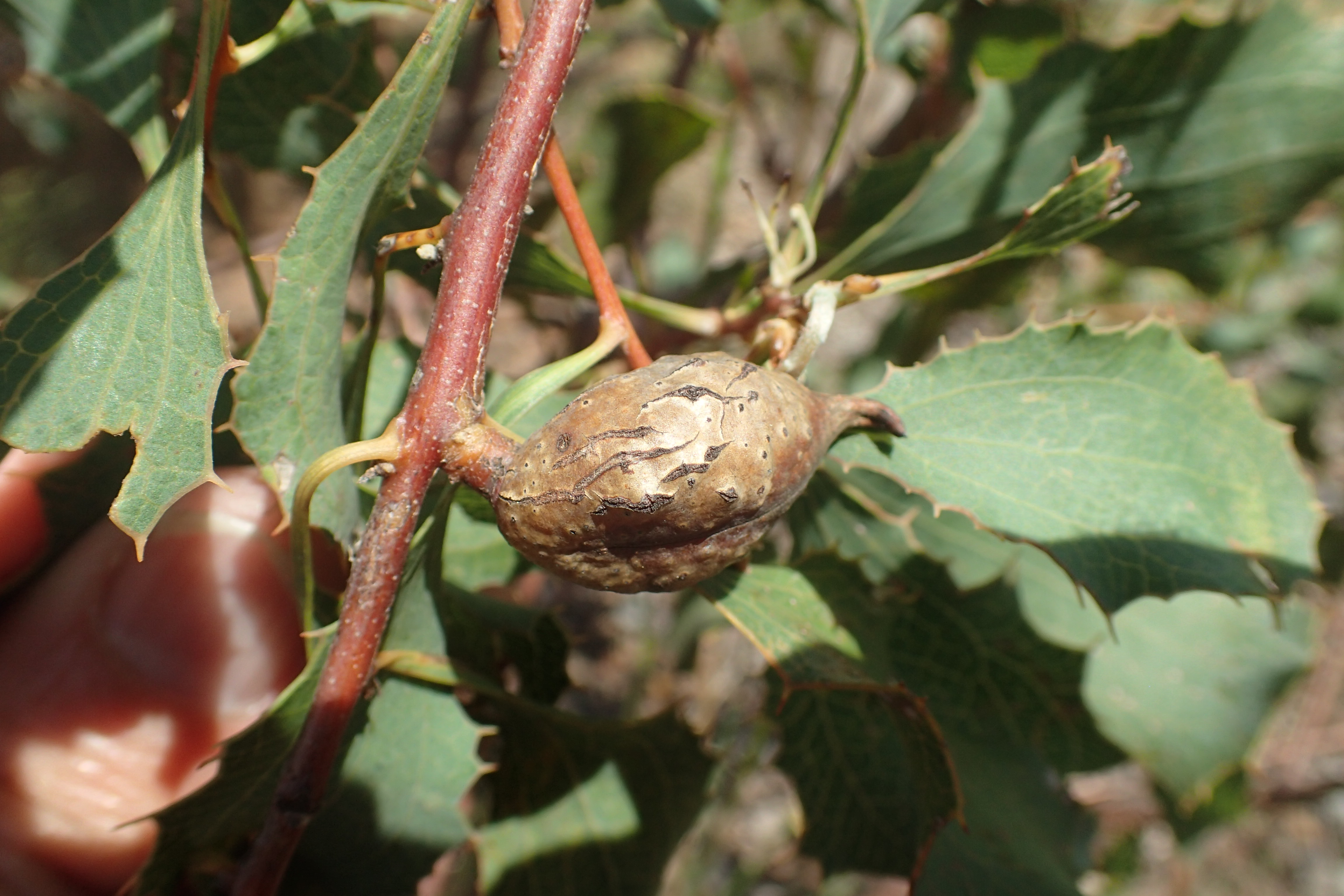
Fruit

Hakea auriculata is a species of flowering plant in the family Proteaceae endemic to Western Australia. A very showy species in full bloom with creamy white, yellow, dark red or reddish purple fragrant flowers.

== Description ==
Hakea auriculata is a lignotuberous compact upright shrub growing to 0.5 to 2.5 metres (1.6 to 8.2 ft) high. Smaller branches are either covered in long soft hairs or smooth. The hairless leaves are egg-shaped wider toward the apex 2 to 5.5 centimetres (0.8 to 2.2 in) long and 8 to 36 millimetres (0.315 to 1.417 in) wide. Leaves are toothed, spaced 1 to 10 millimetres (0.039 to 0.394 in) apart, 1-7 teeth each side, narrower and spinier toward the tip. Leaves may have a sparse covering of matted hairs or smooth. The inflorescence consist of 4-12 pink-cream flowers on a stem 2–4.5 mm (0.08–0.2 in) long with either short or long soft hairs or smooth. Flowers appear in upper leaf axils from June to October. The greenish white or pink perianth is 2.5 to 4.5 mm (0.098 to 0.177 in) long. The pistil is 7 to 11 mm (0.276 to 0.433 in) long. Fruit are egg-shaped, broader toward the stem and 15 to 25 mm (0.59 to 0.98 in) long. The surface is rough with numerous curving spines ending with a small blunt beak. Seeds are 17 to 19 mm (0.67 to 0.75 in) long with a broad wing on one side only.

== Taxonomy and naming ==
Hakea auriculata was first formally described by botanist Carl Meissner in 1855 as part of the William Jackson Hooker work Hooker's Journal of Botany and Kew Garden Miscellany. The specific epithet (auriculata) is derived from the Latin word auricula meaning "lobe of the ear" or "little ear" referring to the shape of the base of the leaf.

== Distribution and habitat ==
Hakea auriculata is endemic to areas along the west coast in the Wheatbelt and Mid West regions of Western Australia between Northampton and Gingin where it grows in sandy heaths and among stony hills and breakaways sometimes over laterite or granite.
