= Robyn Mary Barker =

Australian botanist

- Born: 1948 (age 77–78)
- Scientific career
- Fields: Botany

Robyn M. Barker (born 1948) is an Honorary Research Associate at the South Australian Herbarium. She currently works part-time, and her duties include maintaining of the Vascular Plant Census for the State. Barker's research interests focus on systematics and several plant genera. She is also a life member of the Australian Systematic Botany Society. Among the species she has named and described are Hakea bicornata, H. horrida, H. oligoneura and H. pendens.
