= William Robert Barker =

Australian botanist

- Occupation: Botanist

William (Bill) Robert Barker is an honorary research associate of the State Herbarium of South Australia.

He is a former chief botanist of the State Herbarium. With Robyn Mary Barker and Laurence Haegi he had a particular interest in Hakea in the family Proteaceae. He was also involved in taxonomic revisions of Lawrencia, Lasiopetalum and Spyridium.

In his retirement he is presently involved in outstanding research work, finalising revisions and publications. Barker is a life member and is the current president of the Australasian Systematic Botany Society. His primary research expertise is in biodiversity discovery, species and populations and ecological processes.

== Selected publications ==
- Austin R Mast; Ethan F Milton; Eric H Jones; Robyn M Barker; William R. Barker; Peter H Weston (March 2012). "Time-calibrated phylogeny of the woody Australian genus Hakea (Proteaceae) supports multiple origins of insect-pollination among bird-pollinated ancestors". American Journal of Botany. 99 (3): 472–87. doi:10.3732/AJB.1100420. ISSN 0002-9122. PMID 22378833. Wikidata Q28261006.
- Paul M. Beardsley; William R. Barker (2005). "Patterns of evolution in Australian Mimulus and related genera (Phrymaceae~Scrophulariaceae): a molecular phylogeny using chloroplast and nuclear sequence data". Australian Systematic Botany. 18 (1): 61. doi:10.1071/SB04034. ISSN 1030-1887. Wikidata Q107484566.
- William Barker (17 December 1997). "Taxonomic studies in Euphrasia (Scrophulariaceae). VIII. E. ruptura, a name for a species apparently extinct in northeastern New South Wales". Telopea. 7 (3): 227–230. doi:10.7751/TELOPEA19971016. ISSN 0312-9764. Wikidata Q55801420.
