= Spyridium × ramosissimum =

Branched spyridium

Scientific classification
- Kingdom: Plantae
- Clade: Tracheophytes
- Clade: Angiosperms
- Clade: Eudicots
- Clade: Rosids
- Order: Rosales
- Family: Rhamnaceae
- Genus: Spyridium
- Species: S. × ramosissimum

Binomial name
- Spyridium × ramosissimum (Audas) Kellermann

Species of shrub

Spyridium × ramosissimum, commonly known as branched spyridium, is a species of flowering plant in the family Rhamnaceae and is endemic to Victoria in Australia. It is a small shrub with woolly-hairy branches, egg-shaped leaves, and crowded heads of hairy flowers with brown bracts.

== Description ==
Spyridium × ramosissimum is a shrub that typically grows to a height of 40–60 cm (16–24 in), its branches covered with woolly hairs. The leaves are egg-shaped to lance-shaped, 10–25 mm (0.39–0.98 in) long, 2–7 mm (0.079–0.276 in) wide and glabrous with prominent veins. The edges of the leaves curve slightly downwards, the upper surface greyish-green and the lower surface silky- or rusty-hairy with a prominent midvein. The heads of flowers are crowded with egg-shaped, brown bracts at the base, each head with only a few flowers. The sepals are 3 mm (0.12 in) long, woolly-hairy and longer than the petals. Flowering occurs from August to October and the fruit is a capsule about 3 mm (0.12 in) long.

== Taxonomy ==
This species was first formally described in 1922 by James Wales Claredon Audas who gave it the name Trymalium × ramosissimum in The Victorian Naturalist from specimens collected on Mount Difficult in the Grampians. In 2006, Jürgen Kellermann changed the name to Spyridium × ramosissimum in the journal Muelleria.

== Distribution ==
Spyridium × ramosissimum is a hybrid between S. daltonii and S. parvifolium and is only known from the Grampians, where both parent species occur. It is not known to produce seed.
