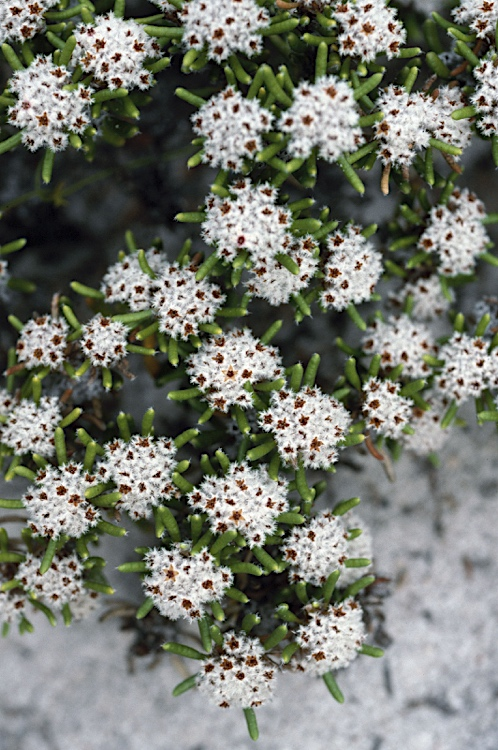

Conservation status
- Priority Three — Poorly Known Taxa (DEC)

Scientific classification
- Kingdom: Plantae
- Clade: Tracheophytes
- Clade: Angiosperms
- Clade: Eudicots
- Clade: Rosids
- Order: Rosales
- Family: Rhamnaceae
- Genus: Spyridium
- Species: S. oligocephalum

Binomial name
- Spyridium oligocephalum (Turcz.) Benth.

Synonyms
- Spyridium kalganense Diels; Trymalium oligocephalum Turcz.

= Spyridium oligocephalum =

Species of shrub

Spyridium oligocephalum is a species of flowering plant in the family Rhamnaceae and is endemic to the south-west of Western Australia. It is a shrub that typically grows to a height of 0.6–1.5 m (2 ft 0 in – 4 ft 11 in), its leaves glabrous except when very young. There are large, papery, orange-brown stipules joined in pairs at their bases, at the base of the petiole. The flowers are arranged in head-like, condensed cymes on the ends of branchlets. The sepals are about 1 mm (0.039 in) long and densely covered with hairs 0.3–0.5 mm (0.012–0.020 in) long.

This species was first formally described in 1858 by Nikolai Turczaninow, who gave it the name Trimalium oligocephalum in the Bulletin de la Société Impériale des Naturalistes de Moscou. In 1863, George Bentham changed the name to Spyridium oligocephalum in Flora Australiensis. The specific epithet (oligocephalum) means "few-headed".

Spyridium oligocephalum grows in sandy soil on sandplains in the Esperance Plains and Jarrah Forest bioregions of south-western Western Australia. It is listed as "Priority Three" by the Government of Western Australia Department of Biodiversity, Conservation and Attractions, meaning that it is poorly known and known from only a few locations but is not under imminent threat.
