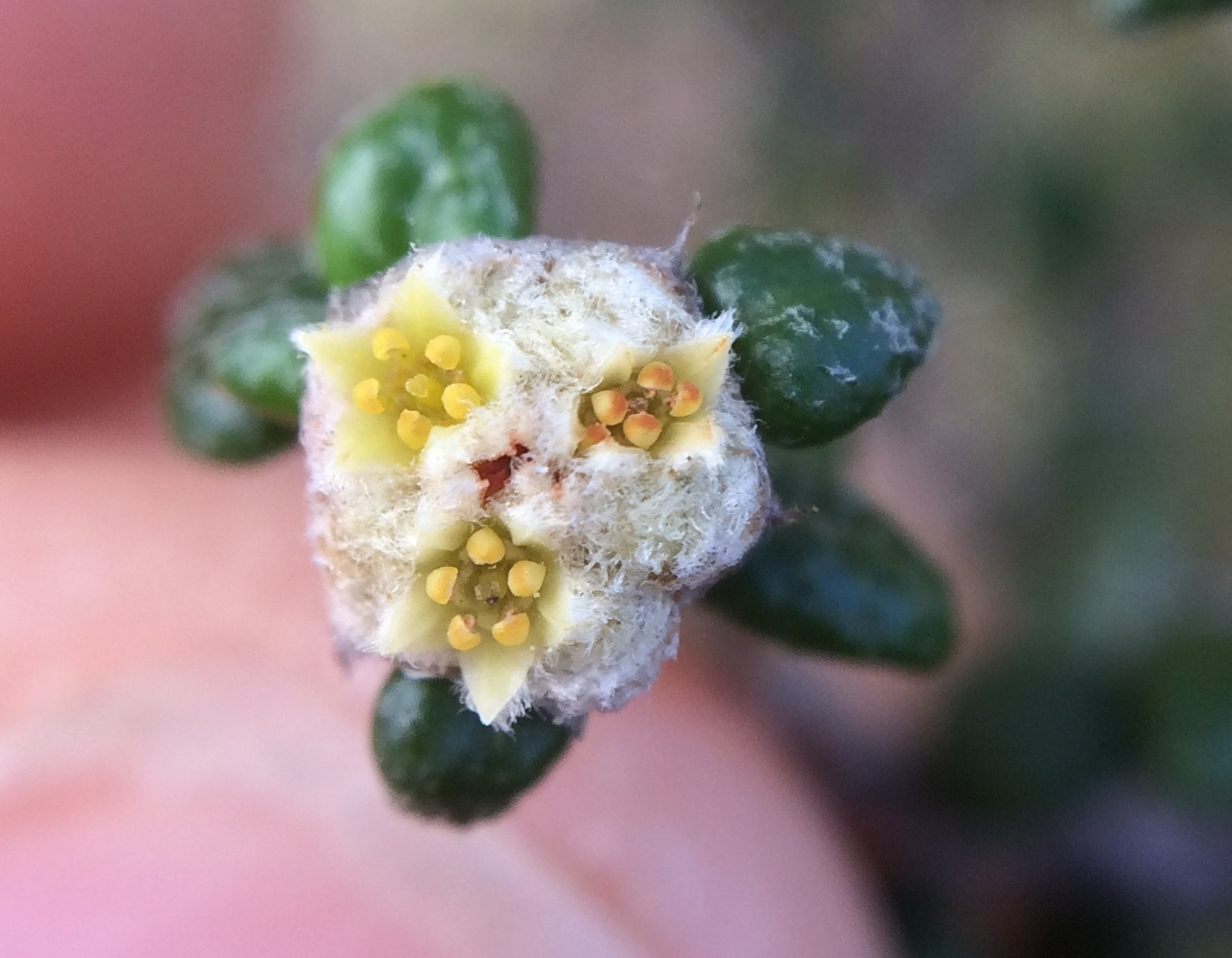
- Near Jerdacuttup

Scientific classification
- Kingdom: Plantae
- Clade: Tracheophytes
- Clade: Angiosperms
- Clade: Eudicots
- Clade: Rosids
- Order: Rosales
- Family: Rhamnaceae
- Genus: Spyridium
- Species: S. cordatum

Binomial name
- Spyridium cordatum (Turcz.) Benth.

= Spyridium cordatum =

Species of shrub

Spyridium cordatum is a species of flowering plant in the family Rhamnaceae and is endemic to the south-west of Western Australia. It is a prostrate, straggling or ascending shrub with leathery, broadly heart-shaped leaves with a notched tip, 2–4 mm (0.079–0.157 in) long with woolly, white or rust-coloured hairs on the lower side. The heads of flowers are 6.5–8.5 mm (0.26–0.33 in) wide with two to four floral leaves at the base. The sepals are up to 1.6 mm (0.063 in) long the petal tube shaggy-hairy with more or less glabrous lobes.

The species was first formally described in 1858 by Nikolai Turczaninow, who gave it the name Cryptandra cordata in the Bulletin de la Société Impériale des Naturalistes de Moscou. In 1863, George Bentham changed the name to Spyridium cordatum in Flora Australiensis. The specific epithet (cordatum) means "heart-shaped", referring to the leaves. Spyridium cordatum mainly grows in gravelly, stony or rocky places in mallee and occurs from near Lake King to the Cape Arid National Park in the Esperance Plains and Mallee bioregions of south-western Western Australia. It is listed as "not threatened" by the Government of Western Australia Department of Biodiversity, Conservation and Attractions.
