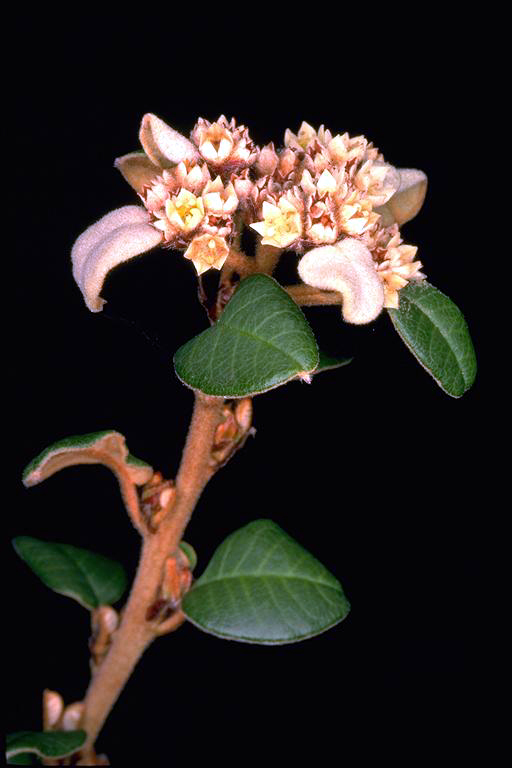
- In the Australian National Botanic Gardens

Scientific classification
- Kingdom: Plantae
- Clade: Tracheophytes
- Clade: Angiosperms
- Clade: Eudicots
- Clade: Rosids
- Order: Rosales
- Family: Rhamnaceae
- Genus: Spyridium
- Species: S. gunnii

Binomial name
- Spyridium gunnii (Hook.f.) Benth.

Synonyms
- Cryptandra gunnii Hook.f.; Spyridium obovatum var. gunnii (Hook.f.) Rodway

= Spyridium gunnii =

Species of shrub

Spyridium gunnii is a species of flowering plant in the family Rhamnaceae and is endemic to Tasmania. It is an upright shrub with more or less glabrous, egg-shaped leaves, the narrower end towards the base, and mostly more than 12 mm (0.47 in) long. The heads of flowers are arranged in cymes surrounded by 2, 3 or more floral leaves. The sepals are about 3 mm (0.12 in) long and woolly-hairy on the outside.

The species was first formally described in 1863 by George Bentham in Flora Australiensis, from specimens collected by Ronald Campbell Gunn on the banks of the Franklin River near Macquarie Harbour.

Spyridium gunnii grows near the west coast and in the western mountains of Tasmania.
