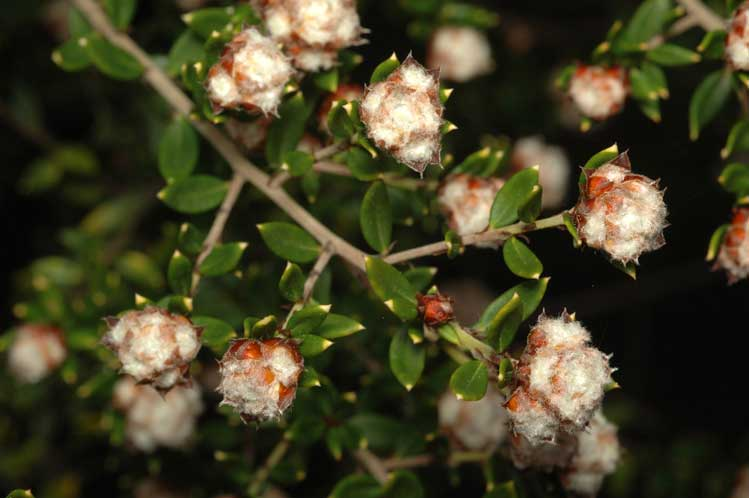
- In the Australian National Botanic Gardens

Scientific classification
- Kingdom: Plantae
- Clade: Tracheophytes
- Clade: Angiosperms
- Clade: Eudicots
- Clade: Rosids
- Order: Rosales
- Family: Rhamnaceae
- Genus: Spyridium
- Species: S. buxifolium

Binomial name
- Spyridium buxifolium (Fenzl) K.R.Thiele

= Spyridium buxifolium =

Species of shrub

Spyridium buxifolium is a species of flowering plant in the family Rhamnaceae and is endemic to New South Wales. It is a spreading shrub with egg-shaped to elliptic leaves, and heads of white, softly-hairy flowers with brown bracts at the base of the heads.

== Description ==
Spyridium buxifolium is a spreading shrub that typically grows to a height of 15–60 cm (5.9–23.6 in). The leaves are egg-shaped to elliptic, 8–25 mm (0.31–0.98 in) long and 3–10 mm (0.12–0.39 in) wide with linear brown stipules 2–3 mm (0.079–0.118 in) long at the base. The upper surface of the leaves is dark green and the lower surfaces in usually covered with greyish, woolly hairs. The heads of flowers are arranged on the ends of branches and are 5–20 mm (0.20–0.79 in) wide with brown bracts at the base of the heads. The flowers are 4–5 mm (0.16–0.20 in) long and covered with soft, white hairs. Flowering mostly occurs in winter and spring.

== Taxonomy ==
This species was first formally described in 1837 by Eduard Fenzl who gave it the name Cryptandra buxifolia in Stephan Endlicher's Enumeratio plantarum quas in Novae Hollandiae ora austro-occidentali ad fluvium Cygnorum et in sinu Regis Georgii collegit Carolus Liber Baro de Hügel, of specimens collected by Allan Cunningham. In 2004, Kevin Thiele changed the name to Spyridium buxifolium in the journal Telopea. The specific epithet (buxifolium) means "box-tree leaved".

== Distribution ==
Spyridium buxifolium occurs mainly in the upper Hunter Valley and nearby Howes Valley.
