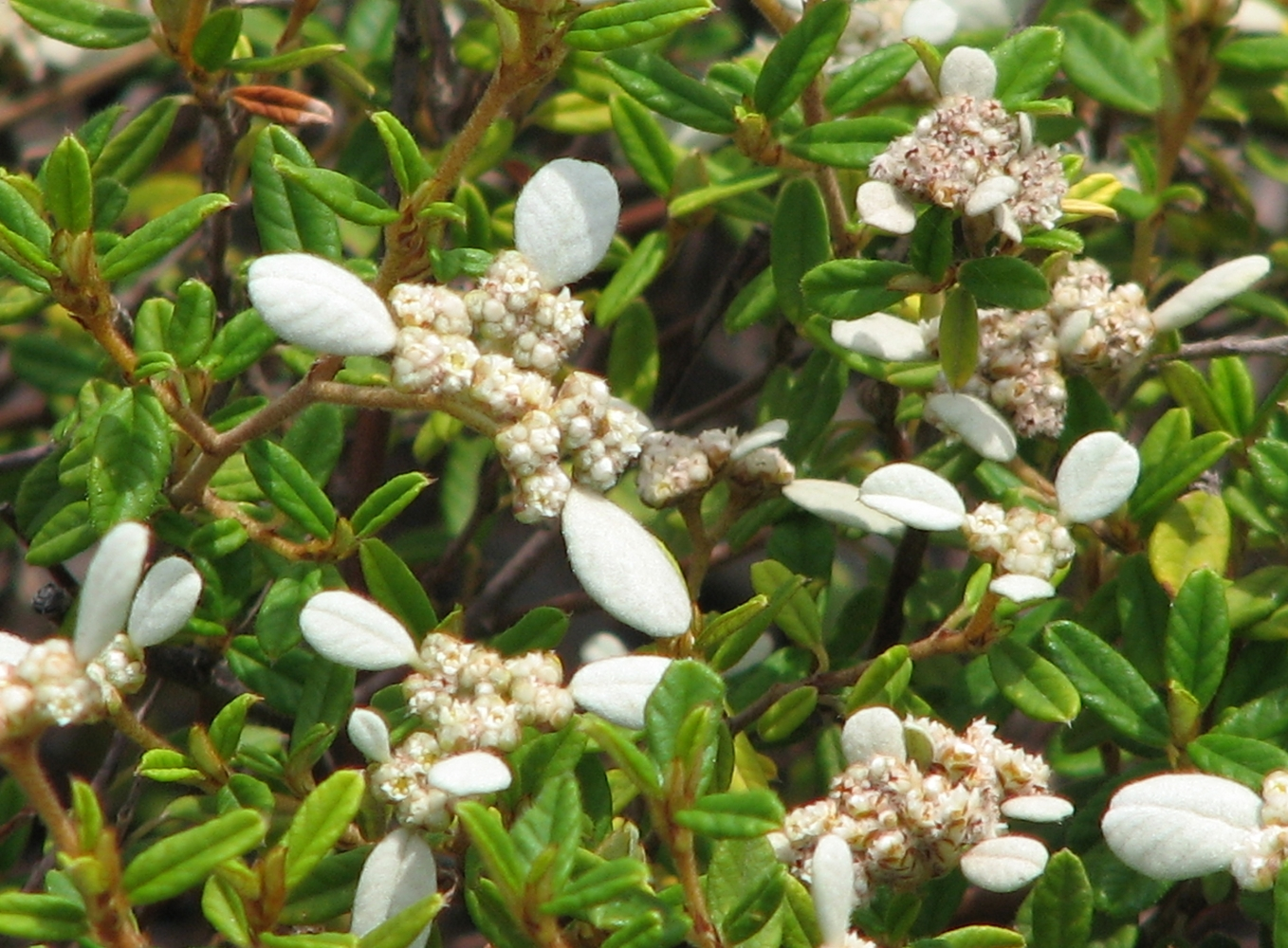
- Spyridium vexilliferum

Scientific classification
- Kingdom: Plantae
- Clade: Tracheophytes
- Clade: Angiosperms
- Clade: Eudicots
- Clade: Rosids
- Order: Rosales
- Family: Rhamnaceae
- Tribe: Pomaderreae
- Genus: Spyridium; Fenzl

Species
- See text

Synonyms
- Cryptandra sect. Solenandra (Reissek) T.Post & Kuntze; Cryptandra sect. Spyridium (Fenzl) Kuntze; Cryptandra sect. Stenodiscus (Reissek) T.Post & Kuntze; Cryptandra subg. Solenandra Reissek; Solenandra (Reissek) Kuntze nom. illeg. p.p.; Spyridum Curtis orth. var.; Stenodiscus Reissek; Trymalium subg. Eutrymalium Reissek nom. inval.

= Spyridium =

Genus of flowering plants

Spyridium is a genus of about thirty species of flowering plants in the family Rhamnaceae, and is endemic to Australia. Plants in the genus Spyridium are shrubs or subshrubs usually with small leaves, flowers usually in clusters of small composite heads, the individual flowers small and densely woolly-hairy, and the fruit a capsule. Species of Spyridium are found in all Australian states except Queensland.

== Description ==
Plants in the genus Spyridium are shrubs or subshrubs, usually less than 1 m (3 ft 3 in) tall and have hairy branchlets. The leaves are arranged alternately along the branches and are usually small, with papery brown stipules at the base. The flowers are small, bisexual, densely white woolly-hairy, sessile and usually borne in small composite heads with small brown bracts at the base, the heads themselves usually clustered in a corymbose cyme. There are five sepals, five petals and three carpels, and the fruit is a capsule with the remains of the sepals attached.

== Taxonomy ==
The genus Spyridium was first formally described in 1837 by Eduard Fenzl in Stephan Endlicher's Enumeratio plantarum quas in Novae Hollandiae ora austro-occidentali ad fluvium Cygnorum et in sinu Regis Georgii collegit Carolus Liber Baro de Hügel and the first species described was Spyridium eriocephalum. The genus name (Spyridium) means "a small basket", referring to the bracts surrounding the clusters of flowers.

=== Species list ===
The names of the following species of Spyridium are accepted by the Australian Plant Census as at June 2022:

- Spyridium bifidum (F.Muell.) F.Muell. ex Benth. – forked spyridium (S.A.)
- Spyridium burragorang K.R.Thiele (N.S.W.)
- Spyridium buxifolium (Fenzl) K.R.Thiele (N.S.W.)
- Spyridium cinereum N.A.Wakef. – tiny spyridium (N.S.W., Vic.)
- Spyridium coactilifolium Reissek – butterfly spyridium (S.A.)
- Spyridium coalitum Kellerman & W.R.Barker (S.A.)
- Spyridium cordatum (Turcz.) Benth. (W.A.)
- Spyridium daltonii (F.Muell.) Kellermann (Vic.)
- Spyridium eriocephalum Fenzl – heath spyridium, heath dustymiller (N.S.W., Vic., S.A., Tas.)
- Spyridium erymnocladum W.R.Barker (S.A.)
- Spyridium fontis-woodii Kellerman & W.R.Barker – Woods Well spyridium (S.A.)
- Spyridium furculentum W.R.Barker & Kellerman – forked spyridium (Vic.)
- Spyridium glaucum Rye (W.A.)
- Spyridium globulosum (Labill.) Benth. – basket bush (W.A.)
- Spyridium gunnii (Hook.f.) Benth. (Tas.)
- Spyridium halmaturinum (F.Muell.) F.Muell. ex Benth. (S.A.)
- Spyridium lawrencei (Hook.f.) Benth. (Tas.)
- Spyridium leucopogon (F.Muell. ex Reissek) F.Muell. (S.A.)
- Spyridium majoranifolium (Fenzl) Rye (W.A.)
- Spyridium microcephalum (Turcz.) Benth. (W.A.)
- Spyridium minutum Rye (W.A.)
- Spyridium montanum Rye (W.A.)
- Spyridium mucronatum Rye (W.A.)
- Spyridium nitidum N.A.Wakef. (S.A., Vic.)
- Spyridium obcordatum (Hook.f.) W.M.Curtis (Tas.)
- Spyridium obovatum (Hook.) Benth. (Tas.)
- Spyridium oligocephalum (Turcz.) Benth. (W.A.)
- Spyridium parvifolium (Hook.) F.Muell. (S.A., N.S.W., A.C.T., Vic., Tas.)
- Spyridium phlebophyllum (F.Muell.) F.Muell. (S.A.)
- Spyridium phylicoides Reissek (S.A.)
- Spyridium polycephalum (Turcz.) Rye (W.A.)
- Spyridium × ramosissimum (Audas) Kellermann (Vic.)
- Spyridium riparium Rye (W.A.)
- Spyridium scabridum (Tate) Kellerman & W.R.Barker (S.A.)
- Spyridium scortechinii (F.Muell.) K.R.Thiele (N.S.W., Qld.)
- Spyridium spadiceum (Fenzl) Benth. (W.A.)
- Spyridium spathulatum F.Muell. ex Benth. (W.A., S.A.)
- Spyridium stenophyllum (Reissek) Kellerman & W.R.Barker (S.A.)
- Spyridium subochreatum (F.Muell.) Reissek (W.A., S.A., Vic.)
- Spyridium thymifolium Reissek (S.A.)
- Spyridium tricolor W.R.Barker & Rye (W.A., S.A.)
- Spyridium ulicinum (Hook.) Benth. (Tas.)
- Spyridium vexilliferum (Hook.) Reissek (S.A., Vic., Tas.)
- Spyridium villosum (Turcz.) Benth. (W.A.)
- Spyridium waterhousei F.Muell. (S.A.)
