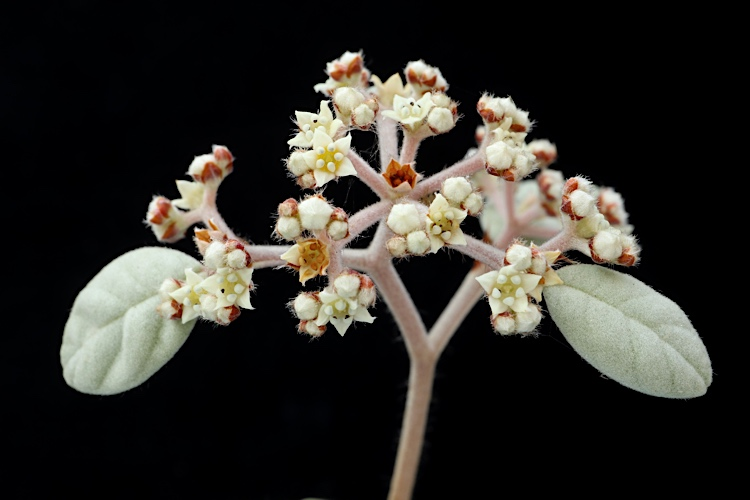
- In the Australian National Botanic Gardens

Conservation status
- Priority Four — Rare Taxa (DEC)

Scientific classification
- Kingdom: Plantae
- Clade: Tracheophytes
- Clade: Angiosperms
- Clade: Eudicots
- Clade: Rosids
- Order: Rosales
- Family: Rhamnaceae
- Genus: Spyridium
- Species: S. spadiceum

Binomial name
- Spyridium spadiceum (Fenzl) Benth.

Synonyms
- Cryptandra spadicea (Fenzl) F.Muell.; Pomaderris hirsuta Steud.; Spyridium spadiceum (Fenzl) Benth. var. spadiceum; Trymalium spadiceum Fenzl; Trymalium thomasioides Turcz.

= Spyridium spadiceum =

Species of shrub

Spyridium spadiceum is a species of flowering plant in the family Rhamnaceae and is endemic to the south of Western Australia. It is an erect or semi-prostrate shrub with narrowly oblong to oval leaves and heads of hairy flowers with brown bracts at the base.

== Description ==
Spyridium spadiceum is an erect slender, or weak semi-prostrate shrub that typically grows to a height of 0.15–3 m (5.9 in – 9 ft 10.1 in), its branches covered with soft, sometimes rust-coloured hairs. The leaves are narrowly oblong to oval, 1–3 mm (0.039–0.118 in) long, softly-hairy on the upper surface and white on the lower side, the veins sometimes covered with rust-coloured hairs. The flowers heads are arranged in cymes with many broad, brown bracts at the base. The sepal tube is about 2 mm (0.079 in) long and densely hairy.

== Taxonomy ==
This species was first formally described in 1837 by Eduard Fenzl who gave it the name Trymalium spadiceum in Enumeratio plantarum quas in Novae Hollandiae ora austro-occidentali ad fluvium Cygnorum et in sinu Regis Georgii collegit Carolus Liber Baro de Hügel. In 1863, George Bentham changed the name to Spyridium spadiceum in Flora Australiensis. The specific epithet (spadiceum) means "brown" or "date-coloured", referring to the floral bracts.

== Distribution and habitat ==
Spyridium spadiceum grows on granitic hills in the Porongurup Range and at Albany in the Jarrah Forest bioregion in the south of Western Australia.

== Conservation status ==
Spyridium spadiceum is listed as "Priority Four" by the Government of Western Australia Department of Biodiversity, Conservation and Attractions, meaning that it is rare or near threatened.
