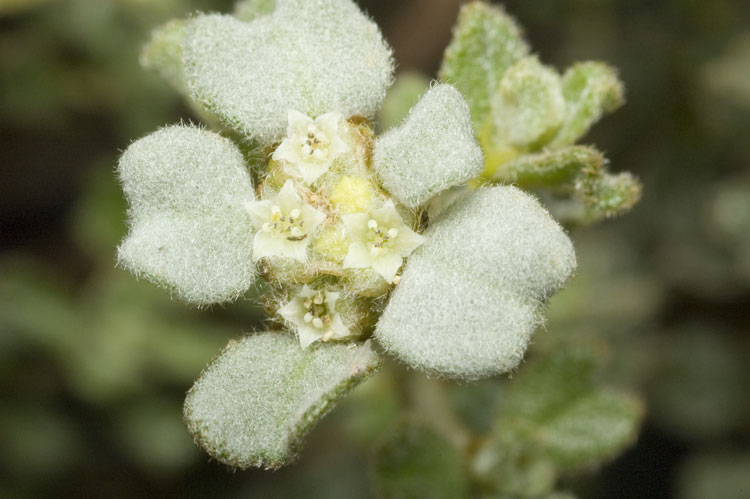
- In the Australian National Botanic Gardens

Scientific classification
- Kingdom: Plantae
- Clade: Tracheophytes
- Clade: Angiosperms
- Clade: Eudicots
- Clade: Rosids
- Order: Rosales
- Family: Rhamnaceae
- Genus: Spyridium
- Species: S. halmaturinum

Binomial name
- Spyridium halmaturinum (F.Muell.) F.Muell. ex Benth.

= Spyridium halmaturinum =

Kangaroo Island spyridium

Species of shrub

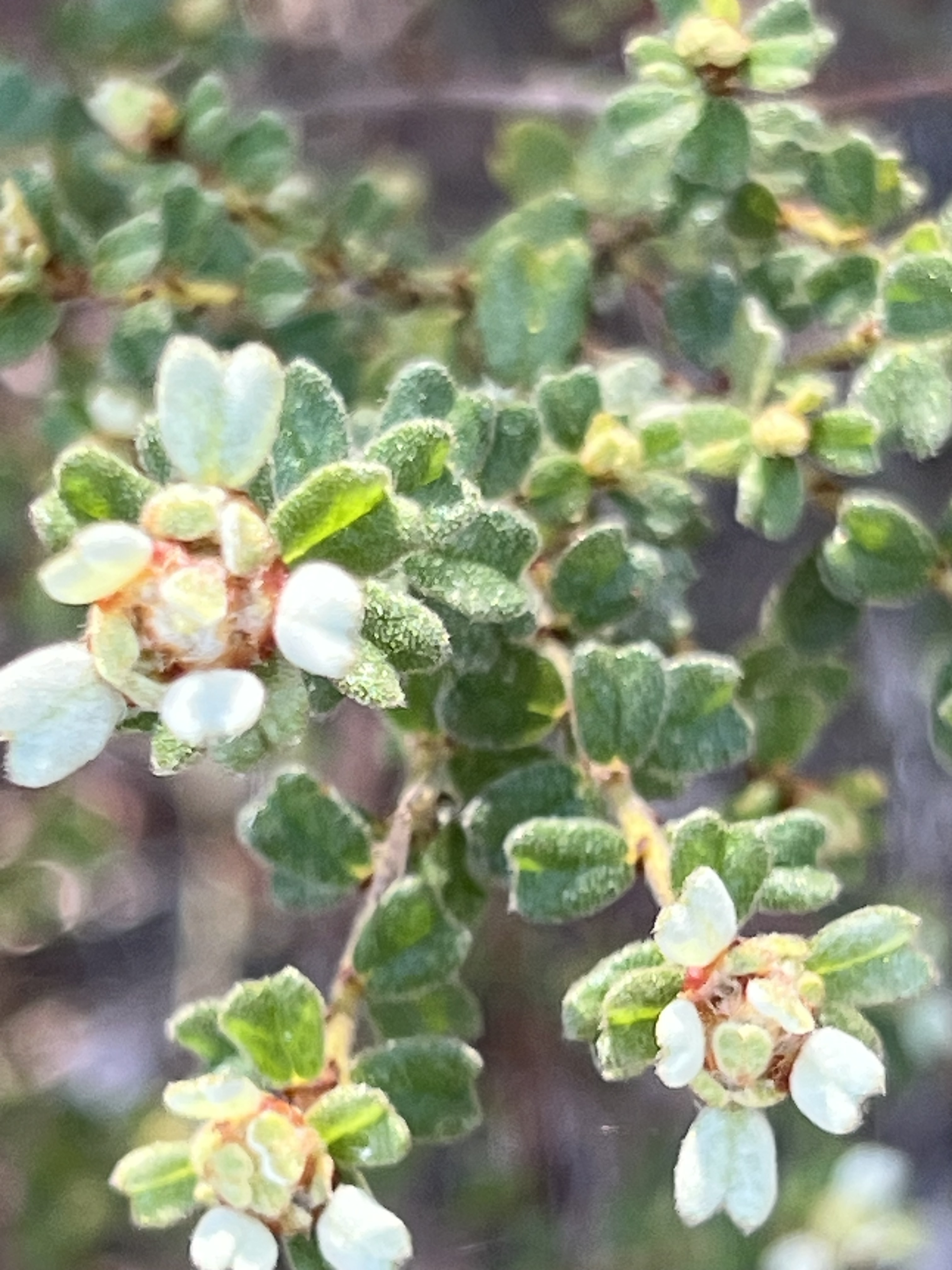
Foliage

Spyridium halmaturinum, commonly known as Kangaroo Island spyridium, is a species of flowering plant in the family Rhamnaceae and is endemic to Kangaroo Island in South Australia. It is an erect, sticky shrub with densely softly-hairy young stems, leaves that are heart-shaped with the narrower end towards the base to broadly wedge-shaped or Y-shaped, and dense heads of white to cream-coloured flowers.

== Description ==
Spyridium halmaturinum is a shrub that typically grows to a height of up to 0.3–2 m (1 ft 0 in – 6 ft 7 in) and has sticky foliage, its young stems densely covered with simple and star-shaped hairs. The leaves are heart-shaped with the narrower end towards the base to broadly wedge-shaped or Y-shaped, mostly 5.5–10 mm (0.22–0.39 in) long and 4.2–6 mm (0.17–0.24 in) wide on a petiole 1.5–2.0 mm (0.059–0.079 in) long. There are reddish brown, egg-shaped stipules 1.8–2.7 mm (0.071–0.106 in) long at the base of the leaves. The edges of the leaves are turned down or rolled under, the tip is often forked with two lobes, and both surfaces are covered with soft, star-shaped hairs. The heads of "flowers" are 7–11 mm (0.28–0.43 in) wide, the individual flowers more or less sessile and velvety-hairy. Each head is surrounded by 5 or 6 white floral leaves 4.2–5.7 mm (0.17–0.22 in) long, 2.8–5.5 mm (0.11–0.22 in) wide and densely covered with a velvety layer of star-shaped hairs. The fruit is a dark brown capsule 1.7–2.2 mm (0.067–0.087 in) long.

== Taxonomy ==
This species was first formally described in 1855 by Ferdinand von Mueller who gave it the name Trymalium halmaturinum in his Definitions of rare or hitherto undescribed Australian plants. In 1863, George Bentham changed the name to Spyridium halmaturinum in Flora Australiensis. The specific epithet (halmaturinum) is derived from the Latin word halmaturus meaning "kangaroo", referring to Kangaroo Island, where this species is endemic.

== Distribution and habitat ==
Spyridium halmaturinum grows in coastal heath, shrubland and mallee woodland, mainly on the southern half of Kangaroo Island in South Australia.
