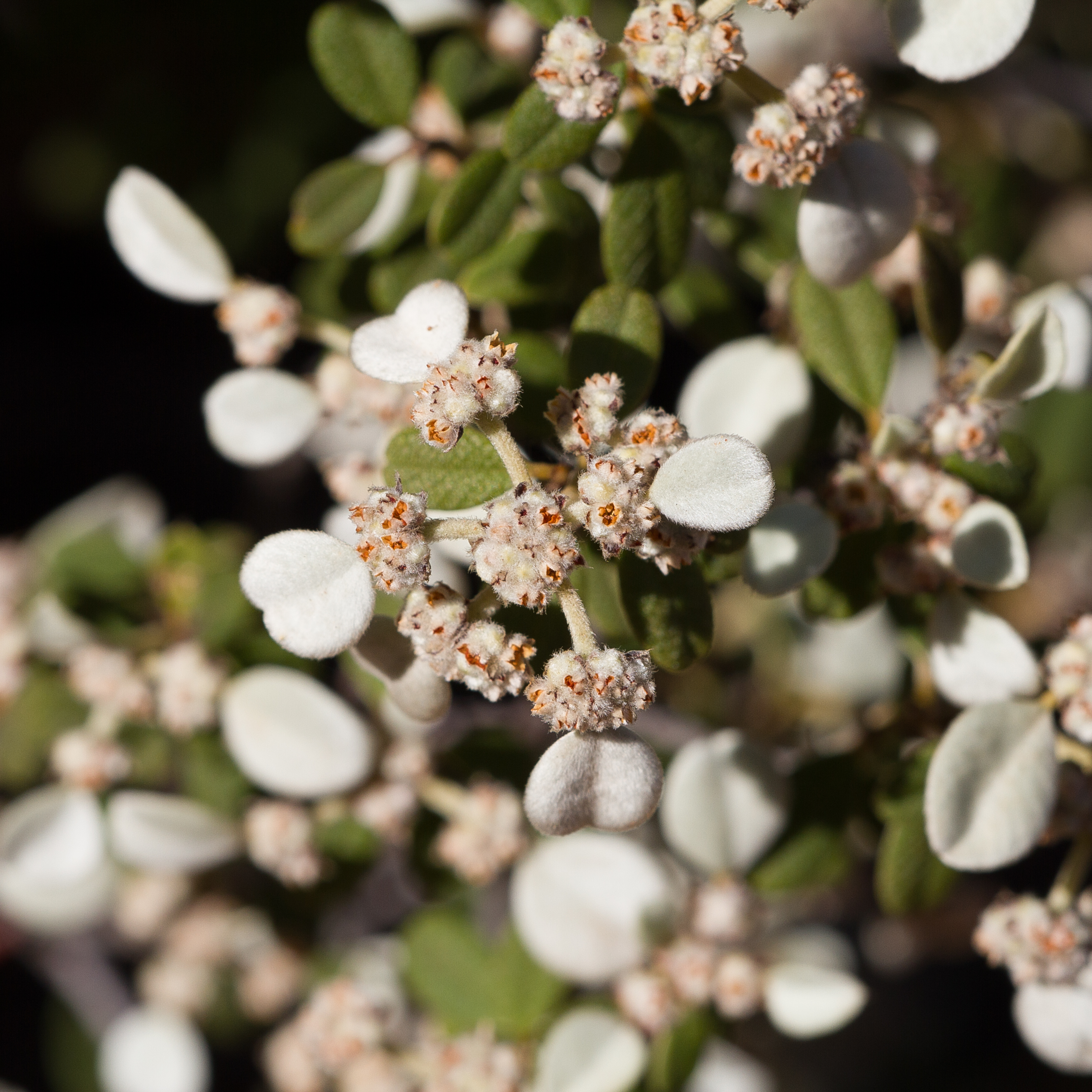
- Near Wilpena Pound

Scientific classification
- Kingdom: Plantae
- Clade: Tracheophytes
- Clade: Angiosperms
- Clade: Eudicots
- Clade: Rosids
- Order: Rosales
- Family: Rhamnaceae
- Genus: Spyridium
- Species: S. phlebophyllum

Binomial name
- Spyridium phlebophyllum (F.Muell.) F.Muell.

Synonyms
- Cryptandra phlebophylla (F.Muell.) F.Muell.; Spyridium phlebophyllum Benth. isonym; Trymalium phlebophyllum F.Muell.; Trymalium phlebophyllum F.Muell. isonym

= Spyridium phlebophyllum =

Species of shrub

Spyridium phlebophyllum is a species of flowering plant in the family Rhamnaceae and is endemic to South Australia. It is a low shrub with rigid, egg-shaped leaves, and heads of flowers with a velvety, white floral leaf.

== Description ==
Spyridium phlebophyllum is a low shrub with rigid, egg-shaped leaves, sometimes with the narrower end towards the base. The leaves are glabrous, 7–15 mm (0.28–0.59 in) long and covered with silky white hairs on the lower surface. The heads of "flowers" are more or less sessile, usually with a velvety white, floral leaf, the disk deeply divided into 5. Flowering occurs in most months and the fruit is a silky, white oval capsule about 3 mm (0.12 in) long.

== Taxonomy ==
This species was first formally described in 1855 by Ferdinand von Mueller who gave it the name Trymalium phlebophyllum in his Definitions of rare or hitherto undescribed Australian plants. In 1863, Mueller changed the name to Spyridium phlebophyllum in Fragmenta Phytographiae Australiae.

== Distribution ==
Spyridium phlebophyllum occurs in the Flinders Ranges, Eastern, Eyre Peninsula, Northern Lofty, and Southern Lofty botanical regions of south-eastern South Australia.
