= Spyridium fontis-woodii =

Scientific classification
- Kingdom: Plantae
- Clade: Tracheophytes
- Clade: Angiosperms
- Clade: Eudicots
- Clade: Rosids
- Order: Rosales
- Family: Rhamnaceae
- Genus: Spyridium
- Species: S. fontis-woodii

Binomial name
- Spyridium fontis-woodii Kellermann & W.R.Barker

Species of shrub

Spyridium fontis-woodii, commonly known as Woods Well spyridium, is a species of flowering plant in the family Rhamnaceae and is endemic to a small area of Coorong National Park in South Australia. It is a slender shrub with softly-hairy young stems, broadly egg-shaped to broadly heart-shaped leaves with the narrower end towards the base, and head of white to cream-coloured flowers.

== Description ==
Spyridium fontis-woodii is a slender shrub that typically grows to a height of up to 1.8 m (5 ft 11 in), its young stems softly-hairy with rust-coloured or greyish, simple and star-shaped hairs. The leaves are broadly egg-shaped to broadly heart-shaped with the narrower end towards the base, 4.0–8.8 mm (0.16–0.35 in) long and 3.5–6.5 mm (0.14–0.26 in) wide on a petiole 1–2 mm (0.039–0.079 in) long with brown, egg-shaped stipules 1.6–2.6 mm (0.063–0.102 in) long at the base. The leaves are covered with white to greyish hairs, densely so on the lower surface. The heads of flowers are 8–13 mm (0.31–0.51 in) in diameter with 4 or 5 floral leaves at the base, the individual flowers densely packed, sessile, and white to cream-coloured. The floral tube is 0.2–0.5 mm (0.0079–0.0197 in) long, the sepals 0.7–0.8 mm (0.028–0.031 in) long and the petals 0.3–0.4 mm (0.012–0.016 in) long. Flowering has been observed in October and the fruit is a capsule about 2 mm (0.079 in) long.

== Taxonomy ==
Spyridium fontis-woodii was first formally described in 2012 by Jürgen Kellermann and William Barker in the journal Muelleria from specimens collected near Woods Well in Coorong National Park in 1995. The specific epithet (fontis-woodii) is a reference to the type location, fons being a Latin word meaning "well" or "spring".

== Distribution ==
This species of Spyridium grows in open shrubland on partly-exposed limestone, and is endemic to an area near Woods Well in the Coorong National Park in South Australia.

== Conservation status ==
This species is listed as "critically endangered" under the Australian Government Environment Protection and Biodiversity Conservation Act 1999. The main threats to the species include clearance of native vegetation, road maintenance, browsing by rabbits and hares, and weed invasion.
