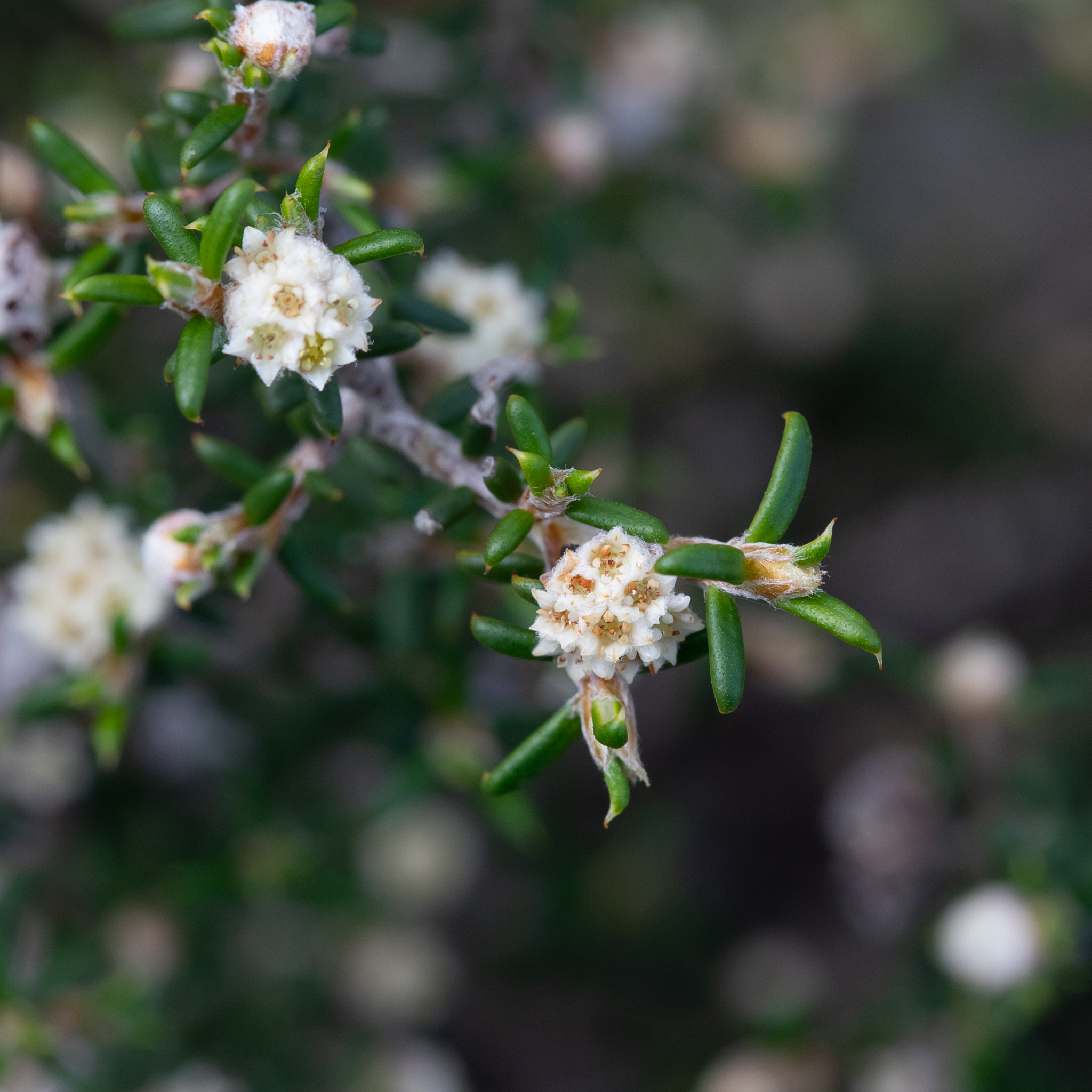
- In the Monarto Conservation Park

Scientific classification
- Kingdom: Plantae
- Clade: Tracheophytes
- Clade: Angiosperms
- Clade: Eudicots
- Clade: Rosids
- Order: Rosales
- Family: Rhamnaceae
- Genus: Spyridium
- Species: S. eriocephalum

Binomial name
- Spyridium eriocephalum Fenzl

= Spyridium eriocephalum =

Species of shrub

Spyridium eriocephalum, commonly known as heath spyridium or heath dustymiller, is a species of flowering plant in the family Rhamnaceae and is endemic to south-eastern Australia. It is an erect to spreading shrub with linear leaves, and heads of white or cream-coloured, woolly-hairy flowers with brown bracts at the base.

== Description ==
Spyridium eriocephalum is an erect to spreading shrub that typically grows to a height of up to 50 cm (20 in). Its leaves are linear, 5–14 mm (0.20–0.55 in) long and 0.5–1 mm (0.020–0.039 in) wide with linear brown stipules 2.0–3.5 mm (0.079–0.138 in) long at the base. The upper surface of the leaves is glabrous, the lower surface obscured by the down-rolled edges of the leaves. The heads of flowers are 4–10 mm (0.16–0.39 in) wide, arranged on the ends of branches with up to three floral leaves and several brown papery bracts at the base. The flowers are 2–3 mm (0.079–0.118 in) long, white or cream-coloured and covered with woolly white hairs. Flowering mostly occurs from August to November.

== Taxonomy ==
This species was first formally described in 1837 by Eduard Fenzl in Enumeratio plantarum quas in Novae Hollandiae ora austro-occidentali ad fluvium Cygnorum et in sinu Regis Georgii collegit Carolus Liber Baro de Hügel from specimens collected near the Derwent River by Ferdinand Bauer.

John McConnell Black described two varieties of S. eriocephalum and the names are accepted by the Australian Plant Census:

- Spyridium eriocaphalum Fenzl var. eriocephalum;
- Spyridium eriocaphalum var. glabrisepalum J.M.Black differs from the autonym in having flower head and upper leaves that are sticky.

== Distribution ==
Spyridium eriocephalum mostly grows in mallee on sandy flats or dunes, sometimes in rocky places and is found in south-central New South Wales, mostly in the north-west of Victoria, in south-eastern South Australia and in a few isolated places in Tasmania. The variety glabrisepalum is restricted to South Australia.
