= Spyridium glaucum =

Scientific classification
- Kingdom: Plantae
- Clade: Tracheophytes
- Clade: Angiosperms
- Clade: Eudicots
- Clade: Rosids
- Order: Rosales
- Family: Rhamnaceae
- Genus: Spyridium
- Species: S. glaucum

Binomial name
- Spyridium glaucum Rye

Species of shrub

Spyridium glaucum is a species of flowering plant in the family Rhamnaceae and is endemic to a restricted area of south-western Western Australia. It is an erect or spreading shrub with egg-shaped leaves, and clusters of 3 to 6 rusty-hairy flowers.

== Description ==
Spyridium glaucum is an erect or spreading shrub that typically grows to a height of 0.5–1 m (1 ft 8 in – 3 ft 3 in), its young stems densely hairy, the hairs pressed against the surface. Its leaves are usually egg-shaped with the narrower end towards the base, sometimes oblong to elliptic, 12–16 mm (0.47–0.63 in) long and 5–9 mm (0.20–0.35 in) wide on a petiole 2–4 mm (0.079–0.157 in) long, and with the edges turned down or rolled under. The flowers are borne in heads of 3 to 6, the heads 3–6 mm (0.12–0.24 in) wide and densely covered with rust-coloured hairs. The floral tube is 0.8–1 mm (0.031–0.039 in) long and the sepals 0.7–1.2 mm (0.028–0.047 in) long. Flowering occurs from September to November.

== Taxonomy ==
Spyridium glaucum was first formally described in 1995 by Barbara Lynette Rye in the Nuytsia from specimens collected by Eleanor Marion Bennett near Ravensthorpe in 1979. The specific epithet (glaucum) means "bluish-green or grey", referring to the colour of the leaves.

== Distribution ==
This spyridium is only known from hills north-east of Ravensthorpe in the Esperance Plains bioregion of south-western Western Australia.
