= Spyridium coalitum =

Scientific classification
- Kingdom: Plantae
- Clade: Tracheophytes
- Clade: Angiosperms
- Clade: Eudicots
- Clade: Rosids
- Order: Rosales
- Family: Rhamnaceae
- Genus: Spyridium
- Species: S. coalitum

Binomial name
- Spyridium coalitum Kellermann & W.R.Barker

Species of shrub

Spyridium coalitum is a species of flowering plant in the family Rhamnaceae and is endemic to Kangaroo Island in South Australia. It is a slender, erect shrub with softly-hairy young stems, oblong to narrowly elliptic leaves, and head of white to cream-coloured flowers.

== Description ==
Spyridium coalitum is a slender, erect shrub that typically grows to a height of up to 2 m (6 ft 7 in), its young stems softly-hairy with brownish, simple and star-shaped hairs. The leaves are oblong to narrowly elliptic, mostly 6.0–9.5 mm (0.24–0.37 in) long and 2.1–2.5 mm (0.083–0.098 in) wide on a petiole 1.8–2.2 mm (0.071–0.087 in) long with reddish-brown stipules the base. The upper surface of the leaves is greyish-green and the lower surface is densely hairy. The heads of flowers are 5–13 mm (0.20–0.51 in) in diameter with floral leaves at the base, the individual flowers sessile, white to cream-coloured and sparsely hairy. The sepals are about 0.6 mm (0.024 in) long and the petals 0.4–0.5 mm (0.016–0.020 in) long. Flowering occurs from September to November and the fruit is a capsule about 2.5 mm (0.098 in) long.

== Taxonomy ==
Spyridium coalitum was first formally described in 2012 by Jürgen Kellermann and William Barker in the journal Muelleria. It had previously been known as Spyridium halmaturinum var. integrifolium J.M.Black, first published in the Transactions and Proceedings of the Royal Society of South Australia in 1925. The specific epithet (coalitum) means "united by growth", referring to the stipules that are partly fused.

== Distribution ==
This species of Spyridium grows in coastal heath, shrubland and forest on limestone, and is endemic to Kangaroo Island in South Australia.
