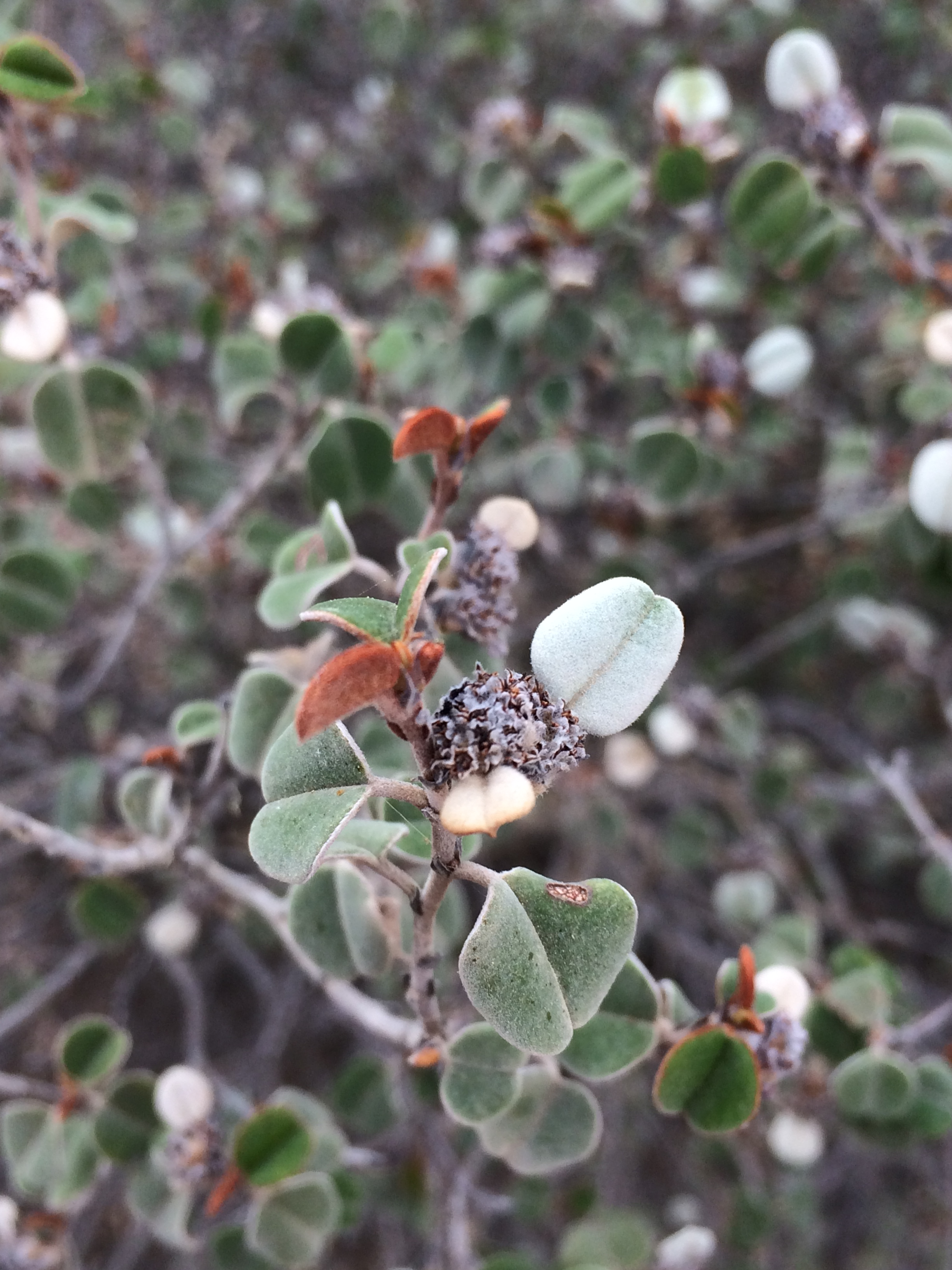

Conservation status
- Priority Two — Poorly Known Taxa (DEC)

Scientific classification
- Kingdom: Plantae
- Clade: Tracheophytes
- Clade: Angiosperms
- Clade: Eudicots
- Clade: Rosids
- Order: Rosales
- Family: Rhamnaceae
- Genus: Spyridium
- Species: S. tricolor

Binomial name
- Spyridium tricolor W.R.Barker & Rye

= Spyridium tricolor =

Species of shrub

Spyridium tricolor is a species of flowering plant in the family Rhamnaceae and is endemic to southern continental Australia. It is an erect shrub with broadly elliptic to round leaves, and dense clusters of densely woolly-hairy, cream-coloured flowers.

== Description ==
Spyridium tricolor is an erect, dense, rounded, densely hairy shrub that typically grows to a height of 0.3–1.5 m (1 ft 0 in – 4 ft 11 in). Its leaves are broadly elliptic to round, 8–13 mm (0.31–0.51 in) long and 7.5–12 mm (0.30–0.47 in) wide on a petiole 3–5 mm (0.12–0.20 in) long, with egg-shaped stipules 3–5.5 mm (0.12–0.22 in) long at the base. The flowers are cream-coloured, densely woolly-hairy and borne on the ends of branches in up to 3 clusters of 12 to 20 flowers on a branched rachis. Each cluster is surrounded by overlapping, broadly egg-shaped involucral bracts 4–6 mm (0.16–0.24 in) long, with a single cream-coloured leaf like bract. The floral tube is 1.2–1.5 mm (0.047–0.059 in) long, the sepals egg-shaped and 1.0–1.3 mm (0.039–0.051 in) long, and both are densely covered with white hairs. Flowering occurs throughout the year.

== Taxonomy ==
Spyridium tricolor was first formally described in 1993 by William Robert Barker and Barbara Lynette Rye in the Journal of the Adelaide Botanic Gardens from specimens collected by Paul G. Wilson, near Point Dover on the Great Australian Bight in 1967. The specific epithet (tricolor) means "three-coloured", referring to the leaves, pale to mid-green on the upper surface, rust-coloured at first, later grey on the lower surface.

== Distribution and habitat ==
This spyridium grows in sandy soil with limestone, often in mallee shrubland between Cape Arid National Park and Eyre in Western Australia, and disjunctly near Ceduna in South Australia.

== Conservation status ==
Spyridium tricolor is listed as "not threatened" by the Western Australian Government Department of Biodiversity, Conservation and Attractions.
