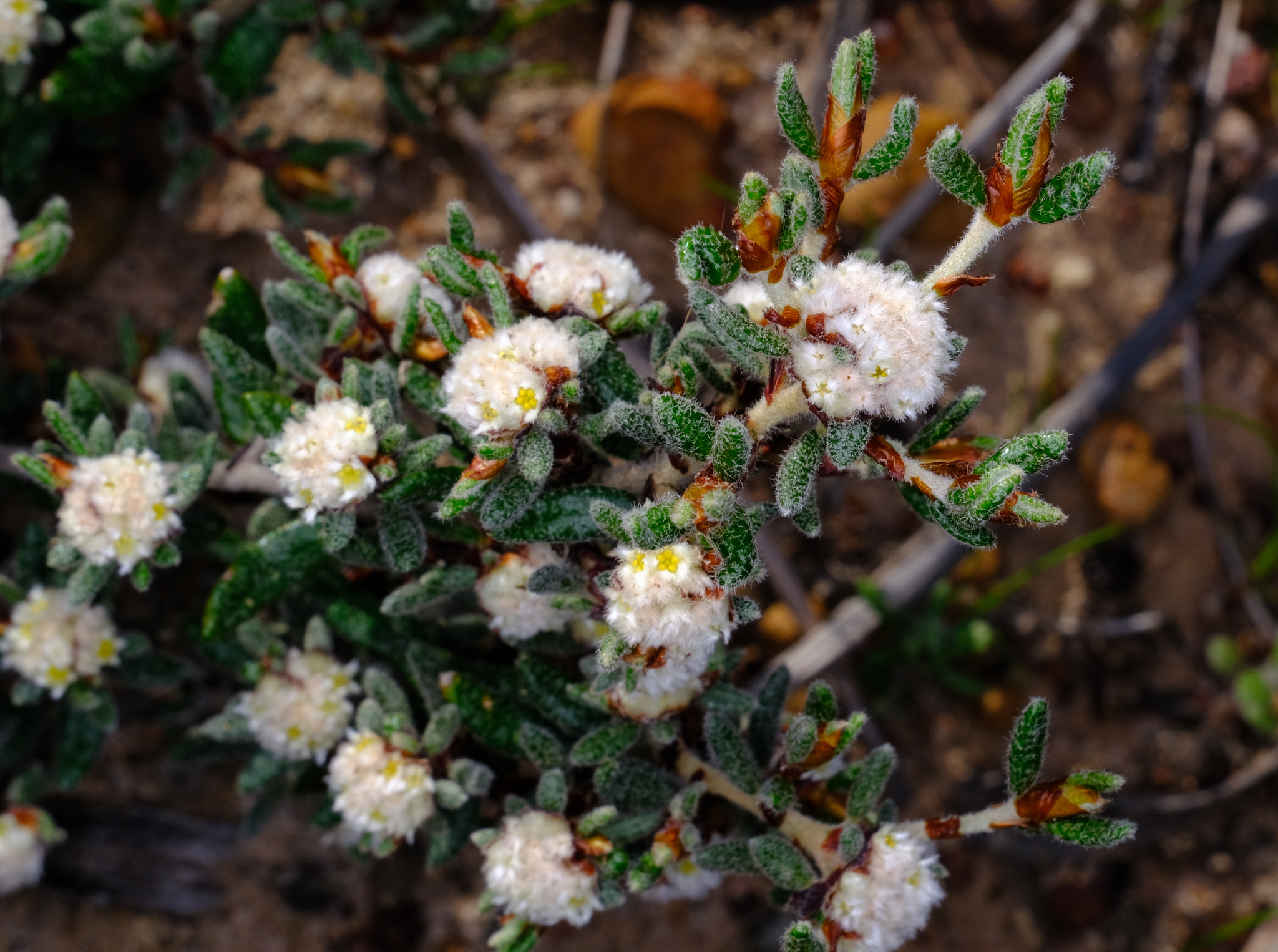
- In Tarin Rock Nature Reserve

Scientific classification
- Kingdom: Plantae
- Clade: Tracheophytes
- Clade: Angiosperms
- Clade: Eudicots
- Clade: Rosids
- Order: Rosales
- Family: Rhamnaceae
- Genus: Spyridium
- Species: S. polycephalum

Binomial name
- Spyridium polycephalum (Turcz.) Rye

Synonyms
- Trymalium polycephalum Turcz.

= Spyridium polycephalum =

Species of shrub

Spyridium polycephalum is a species of flowering plant in the family Rhamnaceae and is endemic to the south of Western Australia. It is an erect shrub that typically grows to a height of 0.3–1 m (1 ft 0 in – 3 ft 3 in) and has white to cream-coloured flowers from April to November. It grows in heathlands and shrublands on coastal dunes, rocky hillsides and plains in the Avon Wheatbelt, Coolgardie, Esperance Plains and Mallee bioregions of southern Western Australia.

This spyridium was first formally described in 1858 by Nikolai Turczaninow, who gave it the name Trimalium polycephalum in the Bulletin de la Société Impériale des Naturalistes de Moscou from specimens collected by James Drummond. In 1995, Barbara Lynette Rye changed the name to Spyridium polycephalum in the journal Nuytsia. The specific epithet (polycephalum) means "many-headed".
