= Spyridium erymnocladum =

Scientific classification
- Kingdom: Plantae
- Clade: Tracheophytes
- Clade: Angiosperms
- Clade: Eudicots
- Clade: Rosids
- Order: Rosales
- Family: Rhamnaceae
- Genus: Spyridium
- Species: S. erymnocladum

Binomial name
- Spyridium erymnocladum W.R.Barker

Species of shrub

Spyridium erymnocladum is a species of flowering plant in the family Rhamnaceae and is endemic to South Australia. It is a low, woody shrub with linear leaves, and heads of about seven woolly-hairy flowers.

== Description ==
Spyridium erymnocladum is a woody shrub that typically grows to a height of up to 30 cm (12 in), its branchlets and green parts covered with erect, straight or wavy hairs. Its leaves are linear, 3.5–6.5 mm (0.14–0.26 in) long and 0.8–1 mm (0.031–0.039 in) wide with the edges rolled under, and dark brown, overlapping stipules 3.5–4.0 mm (0.14–0.16 in) long at the base. The flowers are borne in heads of about seven and are covered with erect hairs, each flower on a pedicel about 0.3 mm (0.012 in) long. The floral tube is 0.8 mm (0.031 in) long, the sepals 0.7 mm (0.028 in) long and the petals 0.5 mm (0.020 in) long.

== Taxonomy ==
Spyridium erymnocladum was first formally described in 1995 by William Robert Barker in the Journal of the Adelaide Botanic Gardens from specimens collected near Karkarooka between Kielpa and Rudall in 1993. The specific epithet (erymnocladum) means "fenced branch", referring to the overlapping stipules that completely shield the branchlets.

== Distribution ==
This spyridium is only known from two collections made in 1986 and 1993 from two sites 10 to 15 km (6.2 to 9.3 mi) apart between the towns of Cleve and Darke Peak on the Eyre Peninsula of South Australia.
