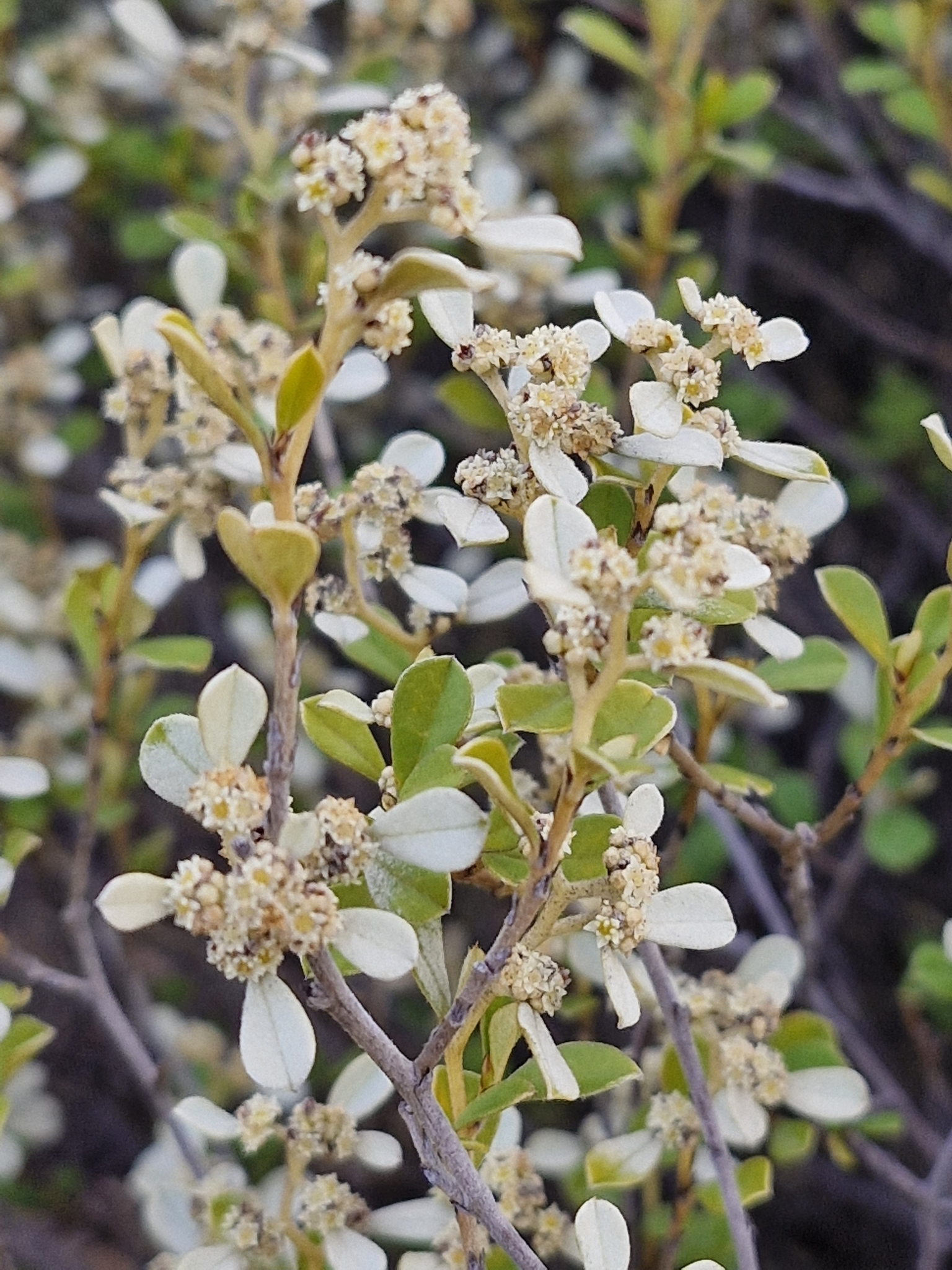
- On Kangaroo Island

Scientific classification
- Kingdom: Plantae
- Clade: Tracheophytes
- Clade: Angiosperms
- Clade: Eudicots
- Clade: Rosids
- Order: Rosales
- Family: Rhamnaceae
- Genus: Spyridium
- Species: S. nitidum

Binomial name
- Spyridium nitidum N.A.Wakef.

= Spyridium nitidum =

Species of shrub

Spyridium nitidum, commonly known as shining spyridium, is a species of flowering plant in the family Rhamnaceae and is endemic to south-eastern continental Australia. It is an erect, spindly shrub with narrowly elliptic or narrowly egg-shaped leaves with the narrower end towards the base, and heads of hairy, woolly white flowers.

== Description ==
Spyridium nitidum is an erect, spindly shrub that typically grows to a height of up to about 2 m (6 ft 7 in), its young stems silky-hairy. Its leaves are narrowly elliptic or narrowly egg-shaped with the narrower end towards the base, 5–15 mm (0.20–0.59 in) long and 2–7 mm (0.079–0.276 in) wide and petiolate. Both sides of the leaves are covered with silky hairs, and there are lance-shaped stipules 1.5–3 mm (0.059–0.118 in) long at the base. The flowers are white about 5 mm (0.20 in) in diameter, and borne in clusters 2–3 mm (0.079–0.118 in) in diameter on the ends of branchlets with a single creamy-white leaf and several sticky brown bracts at the base. The floral tube is 1.5–2 mm (0.059–0.079 in) long, the sepals about 0.8 mm (0.031 in) long. Flowering mainly occurs from July to October and the fruit is about 2 mm (0.079 in) long.

== Taxonomy ==
Spyridium nitidum was first formally described in 1957 by Norman Arthur Wakefield in The Victorian Naturalist. The specific epithet (nitidum) means "shining".

== Distribution ==
Shining spyridium grows in south-eastern South Australia, including on the Eyre Peninsula and Kangaroo Island, and in the Big Desert area of Victoria, near the border with South Australia.
