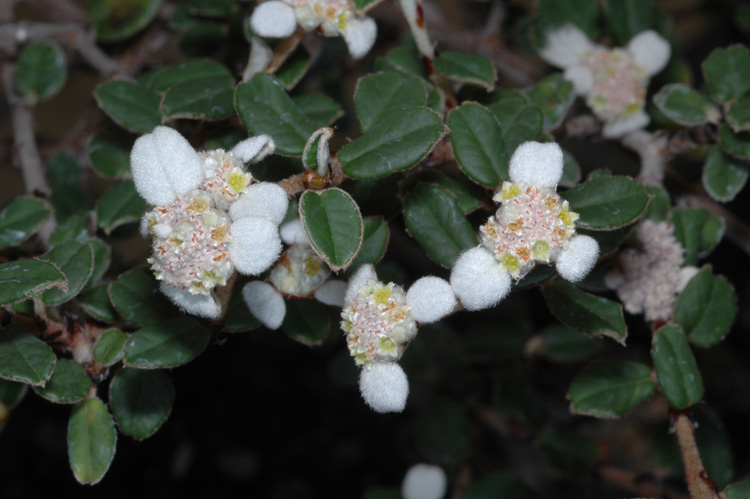
- In the Australian National Botanic Gardens

Scientific classification
- Kingdom: Plantae
- Clade: Tracheophytes
- Clade: Angiosperms
- Clade: Eudicots
- Clade: Rosids
- Order: Rosales
- Family: Rhamnaceae
- Genus: Spyridium
- Species: S. thymifolium

Binomial name
- Spyridium thymifolium Reissek

Synonyms
- Spyridium coactilifolium var. integrifolium Benth.; Spyridium stuarti Reissek orth. var.; Spyridium stuartii Reissek; Trymalium stuarti Reissek nom. inval., pro syn.; Cryptandra obovata auct. non (Hook.) Hook.f. in Tate, R. (1890)

= Spyridium thymifolium =

Species of shrub

Spyridium thymifolium, commonly known as thyme-leaved spyridium, is a species of flowering plant in the family Rhamnaceae and is endemic to the south-east of South Australia. It is a small shrub with egg-shaped to almost round leaves, and heads of woolly-hairy flowers.

== Description ==
Spyridium thymifolium is a shrub that typically grows to a height of about 50 cm (20 in) and has slender branchlets covered with white or rust-coloured, woolly hairs. The leaves are egg-shaped to almost round, 7–20 mm (0.28–0.79 in) long and 4–15 mm (0.16–0.59 in) wide with brownish-black stipules at the base. The upper surface of the leaves is glabrous and the lower surface covered with greyish, woolly hairs. The heads of "flowers" are 4–9 mm (0.16–0.35 in) in diameter and woolly-hairy surrounded by 2 to 3 more or less round, white, velvety floral leaves and with dark brown bracts at the base. Flowering occurs from September to February.

== Taxonomy ==
Spyridium thymifolium was first formally described in 1858 by Siegfried Reissek in the journal Linnaea from specimens collected by Ferdinand von Mueller, near Encounter Bay in 1847. The specific epithet (thymifolium) means "thyme-leaved".

== Distribution ==
Spyridium thymifolium occurs in the Southern Lofty and Kangaroo Island botanical regions of south-eastern South Australia.
