= Spyridium mucronatum =

Scientific classification
- Kingdom: Plantae
- Clade: Tracheophytes
- Clade: Angiosperms
- Clade: Eudicots
- Clade: Rosids
- Order: Rosales
- Family: Rhamnaceae
- Genus: Spyridium
- Species: S. mucronatum

Binomial name
- Spyridium mucronatum Rye

Species of shrub

Spyridium mucronatum is a species of flowering plant in the family Rhamnaceae and is endemic to the south of Western Australia. It is an erect or spreading shrub usually with narrowly oblong leaves, and dense clusters of up to ten densely hairy, white to yellow flowers.

== Description ==
Spyridium mucronatum is an erect or spreading shrub that typically grows to a height of 15–60 cm (5.9–23.6 in), its young stems densely covered with star-shaped hairs. Its leaves are usually narrowly oblong, 2.5–4.3 mm (0.098–0.169 in) long and 0.6–1.6 mm (0.024–0.063 in) wide on a petiole 0.5–1.3 mm (0.020–0.051 in) long. The edges of the leaves are rolled under, enclosing most of the hairy lower surface. The flowers are white or yellow and borne in dense clusters of 4 to 12, the floral tube 0.9–1.3 mm (0.035–0.051 in) long, the sepals 0.6–0.7 mm (0.024–0.028 in) long, and both are densely covered with white hairs. Flowering occurs from September to March.

== Taxonomy ==
Spyridium mucronatum was first formally described in 1995 by Barbara Lynette Rye in the Nuytsia from specimens collected in a nature reserve near Cascade in 1992. The specific epithet (mucronatum) means "pointed", referring to the leaves.

In the same journal, Rye described three subspecies of S. mucronatum and the names are accepted by the Australian Plant Census:

- Spyridium mucronatum Rye subsp. mucronatum usually has flowers in clusters of 3 to 6, the involucral bracts 1.5–2.0 mm (0.059–0.079 in) long.
- Spyridium mucronatum subsp. multiflorum Rye has flowers in clusters of 7 to 14, the involucral bracts 1.5–2.0 mm (0.059–0.079 in) long.
- Spyridium mucronatum subsp. recurvum Rye usually has flowers in clusters of 3 to 6, the involucral bracts 1.0–1.5 mm (0.039–0.059 in) long.

== Distribution ==
This spyridium grows in mallee between Borden, Frank Hann National Park and Cape Arid National Park, in the south of Western Australia, although not as far as the coast. Subspecies mucronatum often grows in the shade of Eucalyptus uncinata trees and is found from Frank Hann National Park to near Cape Arid National Park, subspecies multiflorum in the eastern part of the S. mucronatum range, and subspecies recurvum in the western part of the range, from Borden to Ravensthorpe.

== Conservation status ==
Subspecies mucronatum is listed as "not threatened", but subspecies multiflorum is listed as "Priority Two" meaning that it is poorly known and from only one or a few locations, and subspecies recurvum as "Priority Three" by the Government of Western Australia Department of Biodiversity, Conservation and Attractions, meaning that it is poorly known and known from only a few locations but is not under imminent threat.
