= Spyridium minutum =

Scientific classification
- Kingdom: Plantae
- Clade: Tracheophytes
- Clade: Angiosperms
- Clade: Eudicots
- Clade: Rosids
- Order: Rosales
- Family: Rhamnaceae
- Genus: Spyridium
- Species: S. minutum

Binomial name
- Spyridium minutum Rye

Species of shrub

Spyridium minutum is a species of flowering plant in the family Rhamnaceae and is endemic to the south of Western Australia. It is an erect or spreading shrub with broadly egg-shaped or heart-shaped leaves, and groups of two or three hairy, white flowers.

== Description ==
Spyridium minutum is an erect or spreading shrub that typically grows to a height of 10–25 cm (3.9–9.8 in), its branchlets hairy at first, the hairs pressed against the surface. Its leaves are broadly egg-shaped to heart-shaped, 1.3–1.6 mm (0.051–0.063 in) long and 1.1–1.6 mm (0.043–0.063 in) wide on a petiole 0.3–0.5 mm (0.012–0.020 in) long. The edges of the leaves are turned down and the lower surface is densely covered with white hairs. The flowers are white and borne in groups of 2 or 3, 2–3 mm (0.079–0.118 in) wide, the floral tube about 1 mm (0.039 in) long and densely hairy. The sepals are 0.2–0.5 mm (0.0079–0.0197 in) long and densely hairy. Flowering occurs from March to May.

== Taxonomy ==
Spyridium minutum was first formally described in 1995 by Barbara Lynette Rye in the Nuytsia from specimens collected in 1992. The specific epithet (minutum) means "minute", referring to the size of the plant and all its parts.

== Distribution ==
This spyridium grows on plains in the Coolgardie, Esperance Plains and Mallee bioregions of southern Western Australia.
