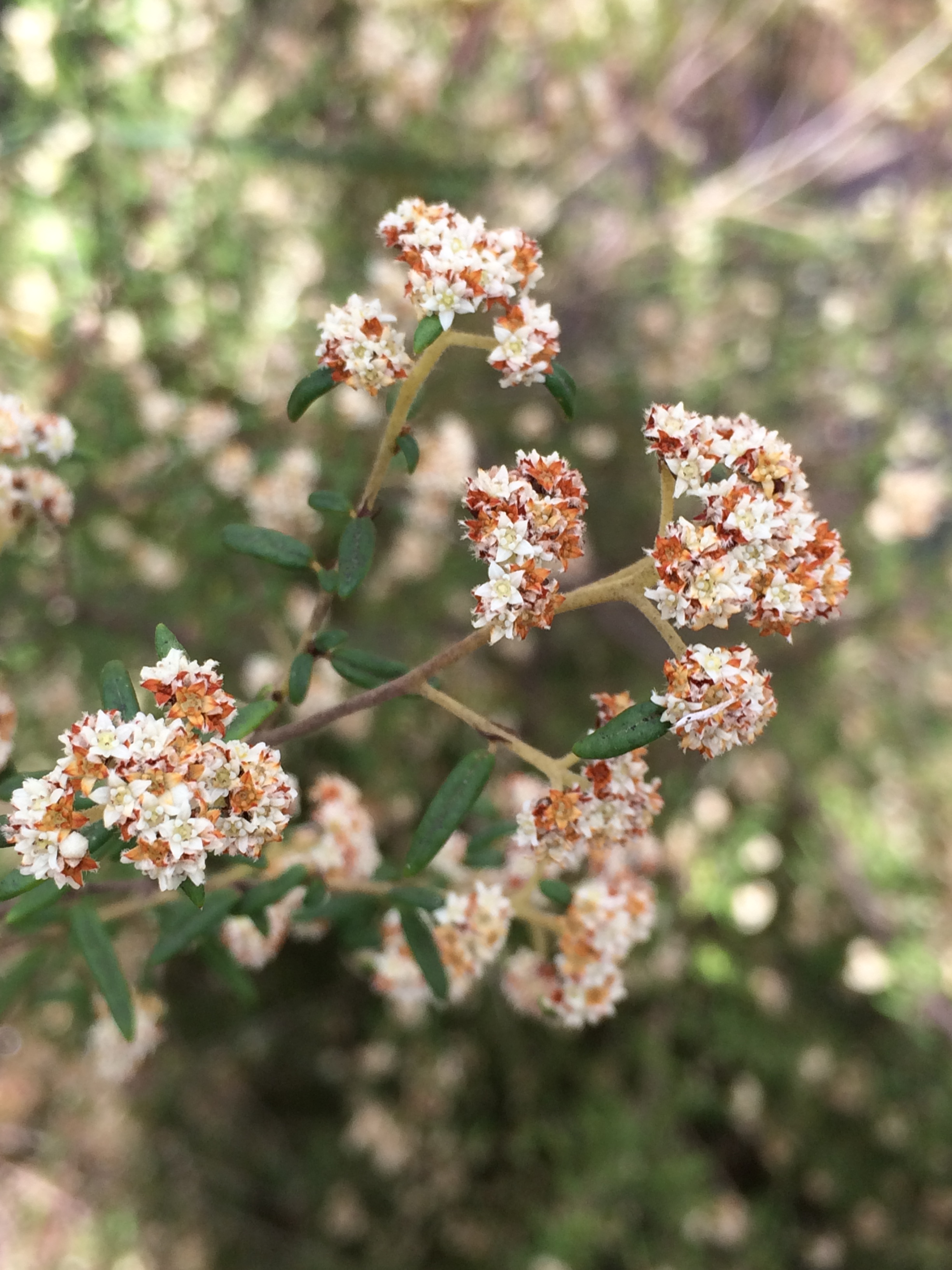

Conservation status
- Priority Two — Poorly Known Taxa (DEC)

Scientific classification
- Kingdom: Plantae
- Clade: Tracheophytes
- Clade: Angiosperms
- Clade: Eudicots
- Clade: Rosids
- Order: Rosales
- Family: Rhamnaceae
- Genus: Spyridium
- Species: S. riparium

Binomial name
- Spyridium riparium Rye

= Spyridium riparium =

Species of shrub

Spyridium riparium is a species of flowering plant in the family Rhamnaceae and is endemic to the south of Western Australia. It is an erect shrub, usually with narrowly egg-shaped leaves, and clusters of densely hairy, white or cream-coloured flowers.

== Description ==
Spyridium riparium is an erect shrub that typically grows to a height of 0.8–1.5 m (2 ft 7 in – 4 ft 11 in), its young stems densely covered with star-shaped and simple hairs. Its leaves are usually narrowly egg-shaped, 8–17 mm (0.31–0.67 in) long and 1.5–3.5 mm (0.059–0.138 in) wide on a petiole 1.5–2.0 mm (0.059–0.079 in) long. The edges of the leaves are rolled under, the upper surface is more or less glabrous and the lower surface white to pale green and densely hairy. The flowers are white or cream-coloured, and borne on the ends of branches in dense clusters 10–18 mm (0.39–0.71 in) wide, and in smaller groups in leaf axils. The floral tube is about 1.2 mm (0.047 in) long, the sepals about 1.2 mm (0.047 in) long, and both are densely covered with minute, star-shaped hairs. Flowering occurs from July to October.

== Taxonomy ==
Spyridium riparium was first formally described in 1995 by Barbara Lynette Rye in the journal Nuytsia from specimens collected by Belinda Hammersley, near the Mitchell River in 1993. The specific epithet (riparium) means "inhabiting river banks".

== Distribution and habitat ==
This spyridium grows along river banks and near streams in sandy or gravelly soils between the Mitchell and Kent Rivers in the Esperance Plains, Jarrah Forest and Warren bioregions of southern Western Australia.

== Conservation status ==
Spyridium riparium is listed as "Priority Two" by the Western Australian Government Department of Biodiversity, Conservation and Attractions, meaning that it is poorly known and from only one or a few locations.
