= Spyridium villosum =

Conservation status
- Priority Two — Poorly Known Taxa (DEC)

Scientific classification
- Kingdom: Plantae
- Clade: Tracheophytes
- Clade: Angiosperms
- Clade: Eudicots
- Clade: Rosids
- Order: Rosales
- Family: Rhamnaceae
- Genus: Spyridium
- Species: S. villosum

Binomial name
- Spyridium villosum (Turcz.) Benth.

Synonyms
- Cryptandra villosua Turcz.

Species of shrub

Spyridium villosum is a species of flowering plant in the family Rhamnaceae and is endemic to the south-west of Western Australia. It is a small shrub with shaggy-hairy branchlets, linear to oblong leaves and dense heads of hairy flowers with broad brown bracts at the base.

== Description ==
Spyridium villosum is a low-growing shrub that typically grows to a height of 0.10–40 cm (0.039–15.748 in), its branches covered with shaggy grey or rust-coloured hairs. The leaves are linear to oblong, 12–20 mm (0.47–0.79 in) long with a downcurved point on the tip, and hairy, especially on the lower surface. The flowers heads are densely crowded in cymes with broad, brown bracts at the base and one or two floral leaves. The sepal tube is about 1.6 mm (0.063 in) long and woolly-hairy.

== Taxonomy ==
This species was first formally described in 1858 by Nikolai Turczaninow who gave it the name Cryptandra villosa in the Bulletin de la Société Impériale des Naturalistes de Moscou. In 1863, George Bentham changed the name to Spyridium villosum in Flora Australiensis. The specific epithet (villosum) means "with long, soft hairs".

== Distribution and habitat ==
Spyridium villosum grows in sand over sandstone, in the eastern part of the Stirling Range, with one collection from near Ongerup.

== Conservation status ==
Spyridium spadiceum is listed as "Priority Two" by the Western Australian Government Department of Biodiversity, Conservation and Attractions, meaning that it is poorly known and from only one or a few locations.
