= Spyridium montanum =

Conservation status
- Priority Two — Poorly Known Taxa (DEC)

Scientific classification
- Kingdom: Plantae
- Clade: Tracheophytes
- Clade: Angiosperms
- Clade: Eudicots
- Clade: Rosids
- Order: Rosales
- Family: Rhamnaceae
- Genus: Spyridium
- Species: S. montanum

Binomial name
- Spyridium montanum Rye

Species of shrub

Spyridium montanum is a species of flowering plant in the family Rhamnaceae and is endemic to the Stirling Range in the south of Western Australia. It is an erect shrub with elliptic or egg-shaped leaves, and groups of up to ten densely hairy, white or cream-coloured flowers.

== Description ==
Spyridium montanum is an erect shrub that typically grows to a height of 1.0–2.5 m (3 ft 3 in – 8 ft 2 in), its young stems densely covered with white and rust-coloured hairs. Its leaves are elliptic or egg-shaped, 20–40 mm (0.79–1.57 in) long and 8–20 mm (0.31–0.79 in) wide on a petiole 5–12 mm (0.20–0.47 in) long. The edges of the leaves turn down and the upper surface is densely hairy. The flowers are white or cream-coloured and borne in groups of 10 or more 12–28 mm (0.47–1.10 in) wide. The floral tube is 1.0–1.2 mm (0.039–0.047 in) long; the sepals 1.0–1.3 mm (0.039–0.051 in) long and both are covered with white, star-shaped hairs. Flowering occurs from April to July and in October.

== Taxonomy ==
Spyridium montanum was first formally described in 1995 by Barbara Lynette Rye in the Nuytsia from specimens collected by Alex George near the eastern end of the Stirling Range in 1970. The specific epithet (montanum) means "pertaining to a mountain".

== Distribution ==
This spyridium is only known from the Stirling Range where it often grows in gullies on the higher parts of the mountains.

== Conservation status ==
Spyridium montanum is listed as "Priority Two" by the Western Australian Government Department of Biodiversity, Conservation and Attractions, meaning that it is poorly known and from only one or a few locations.
