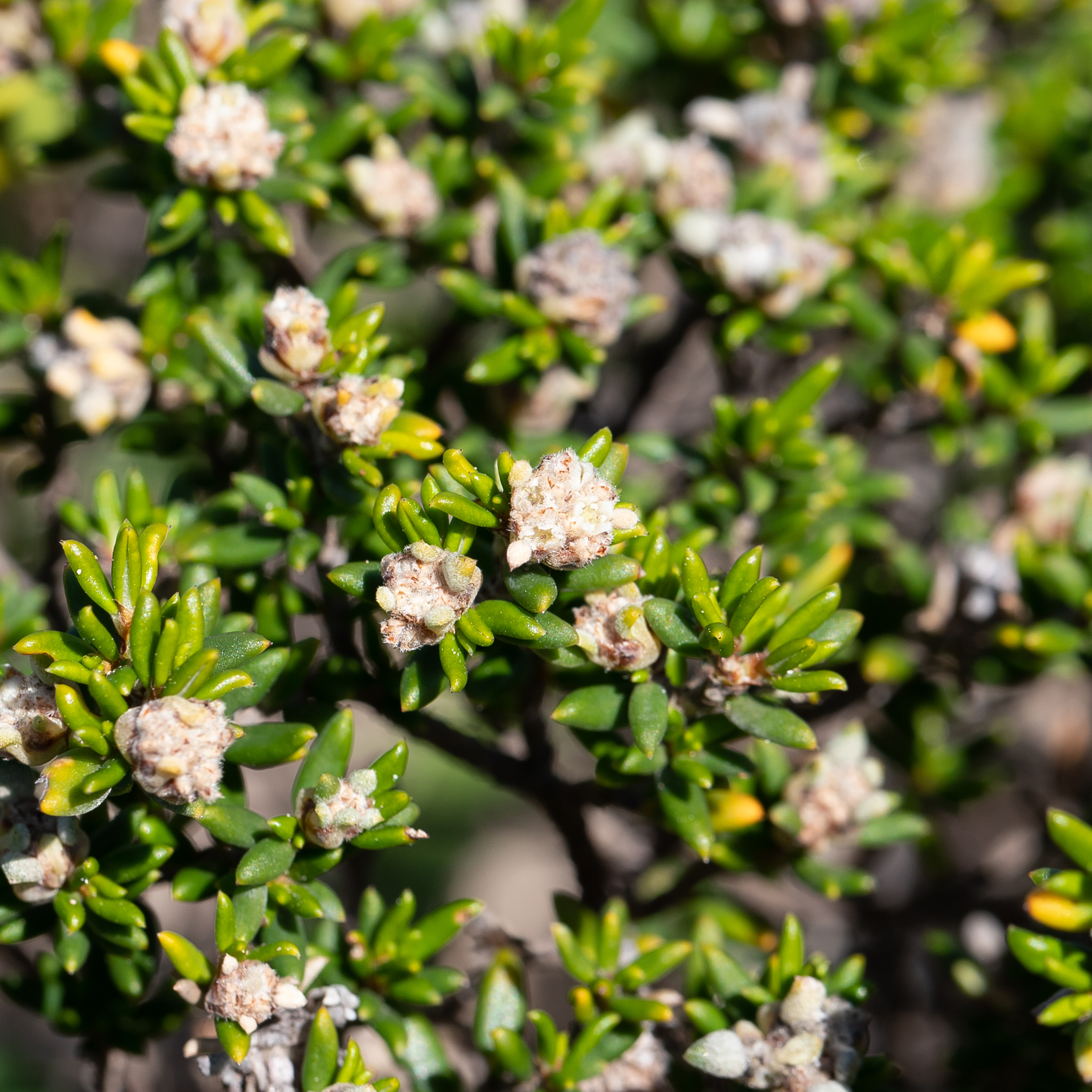
- Near the Cape Spencer Lighthouse

Scientific classification
- Kingdom: Plantae
- Clade: Tracheophytes
- Clade: Angiosperms
- Clade: Eudicots
- Clade: Rosids
- Order: Rosales
- Family: Rhamnaceae
- Genus: Spyridium
- Species: S. phylicoides

Binomial name
- Spyridium phylicoides Reissek

Synonyms
- Trymalium vexilliferum F.Muell. ex Reissek nom. inval., pro syn.; Spyridium vexilliferum auct. non (Hook.) Reissek: Bentham, G. (30 May 1863), Flora Australiensis 1: 433, p.p.

= Spyridium phylicoides =

Species of shrub

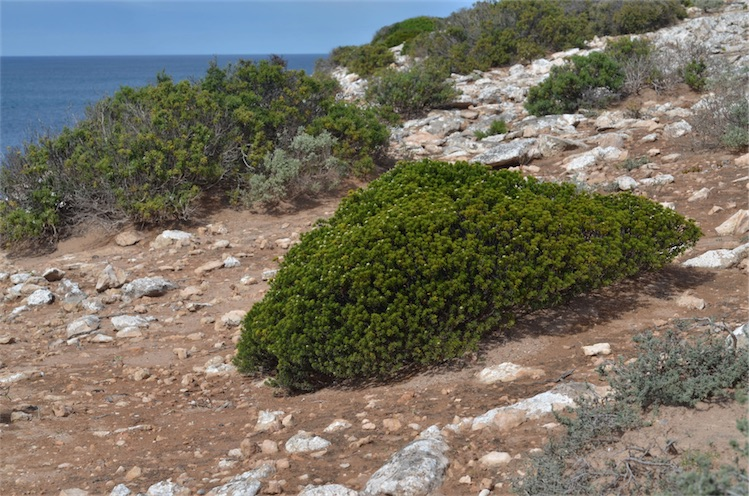
Habit in Cape Blanche Conservation Park

Spyridium phylicoides, commonly known as narrow-leaved spyridium, is a species of flowering plant in the family Rhamnaceae and is endemic to South Australia. It is a low shrub with rigid, linear or lance-shaped leaves, and heads of woolly-hairy flowers.

== Description ==
Spyridium phylicoides is a low shrub with rigid, linear to lance-shaped leaves 5–14 mm (0.20–0.55 in) long and 1–3 mm (0.039–0.118 in) wide with the edges rolled under. The upper surface of the leaves is glabrous and the lower surface woolly-hairy, but often hidden by the inrolled edges of the upper surface. The heads of "flowers" are more or less sessile, 5–7 mm (0.20–0.28 in) in diameter and woolly-hairy with 2 to 5 floral leaves shorter but broader than the stem leaves. Flowering occurs from September to December and the fruit is an oval to more or less spherical capsule 2–3 mm (0.079–0.118 in) long.

== Taxonomy ==
This species was first formally described in 1858 by Siegfried Reissek in the journal Linnaea from specimens collected by Johann Wilhelmi, near Lake Hamilton in 1855. The specific epithet (phylicoides) means "Phylica-like".

== Distribution ==
Spyridium phylicoides occurs in the Nullarbor, Eyre Peninsula, Murray, Yorke Peninsula, Southern Lofty, Kangaroo Island and South Eastern botanical regions of south-eastern South Australia.
