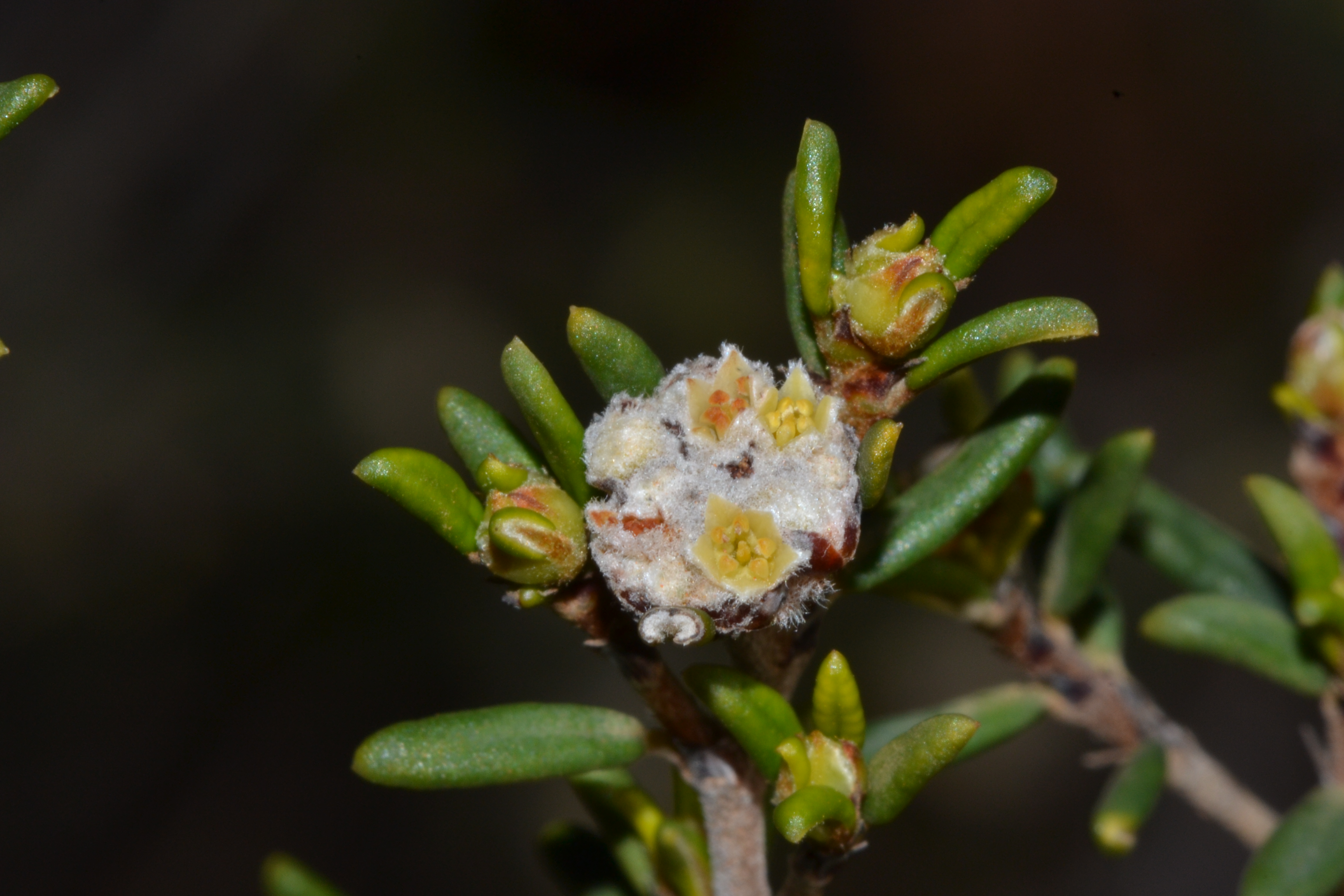
- Near Nyabing

Scientific classification
- Kingdom: Plantae
- Clade: Tracheophytes
- Clade: Angiosperms
- Clade: Eudicots
- Clade: Rosids
- Order: Rosales
- Family: Rhamnaceae
- Genus: Spyridium
- Species: S. microcephalum

Binomial name
- Spyridium microcephalum (Turcz.) Benth.

= Spyridium microcephalum =

Species of shrub

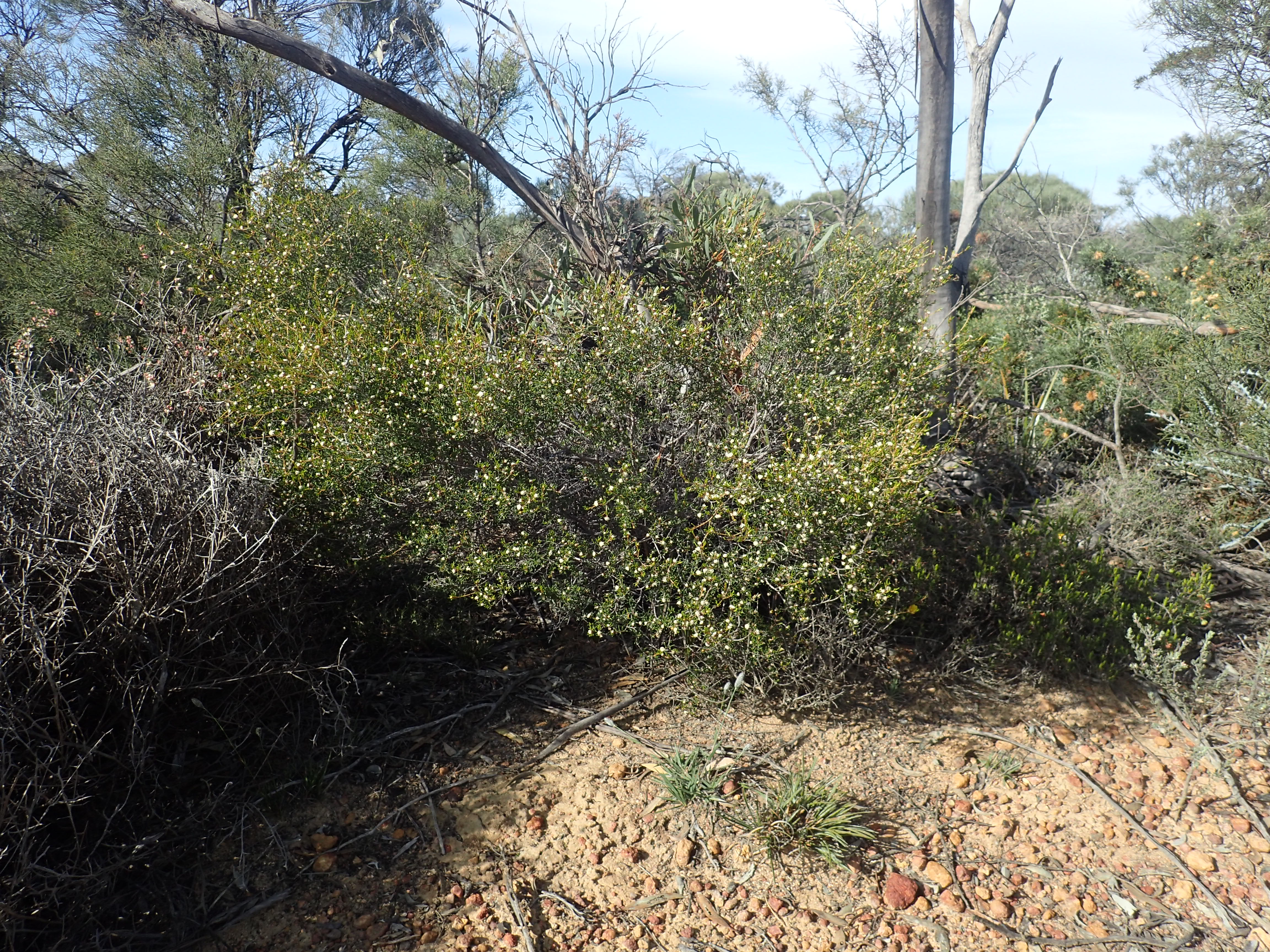
Habit in the Tarin Rock Nature Reserve east of Lake Grace

Spyridium microcephalum is a species of flowering plant in the family Rhamnaceae and is endemic to the south-west of Western Australia. It is a spreading or erect shrub with linear leaves and heads of woolly-hairy flowers.

== Description ==
Spyridium microcephalum is a low, spreading or slender, erect shrub that typically grows to a height of 0.1–1.5 m (3.9 in – 4 ft 11.1 in), its young branchlets covered with woolly, rust-coloured hairs. The leaves are linear, mostly 4–6.5 mm (0.16–0.26 in) long with the edges rolled under obscuring most of the lower surface. The upper surface of the leaves is glabrous and the lower surface is woolly-hairy. The heads of flowers are about 6.5 mm (0.26 in) wide with 1 or 2 prominent, woolly-hairy floral leaves at the base. The sepals are less than 2 mm (0.079 in) long and glabrous.

== Taxonomy ==
The species was first formally described in 1858 by Nikolai Turczaninow, who gave it the name Cryptandra microcephala in the Bulletin de la Société Impériale des Naturalistes de Moscou. In 1863, George Bentham changed the name to Spyridium microcephalum in Flora Australiensis. The specific epithet (microcephalum) means "small-headed".

== Distribution ==
Spyridium microcephalum occurs in the Avon Wheatbelt, Esperance Plains, Hampton and Mallee bioregions of south-western Western Australia. It is listed as "not threatened" by the Government of Western Australia Department of Biodiversity, Conservation and Attractions.
