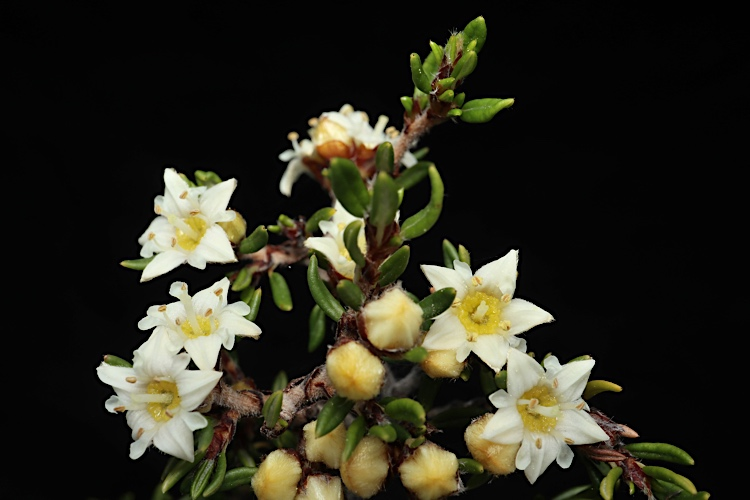
- In the Australian National Botanic Gardens

Scientific classification
- Kingdom: Plantae
- Clade: Tracheophytes
- Clade: Angiosperms
- Clade: Eudicots
- Clade: Rosids
- Order: Rosales
- Family: Rhamnaceae
- Genus: Spyridium
- Species: S. ulicinum

Binomial name
- Spyridium ulicinum (Hook.) Benth.

Synonyms
- Cryptandra ulicina Hook.; Stenodiscus ulicinus (Hook.) Reissek

= Spyridium ulicinum =

Species of shrub

Spyridium ulicinum is a species of flowering plant in the family Rhamnaceae and is endemic to Tasmania. It is a tall shrub with linear to oblong leaves, and single or small groups of white flowers.

== Description ==
Spyridium ulicinum is an upright, heath-like shrub that typically grows to a height of 2 m (6 ft 7 in) or more, and has many branches. The leaves are linear to oblong, mostly less and arranged singly, in pairs or groups of 3 near the ends of short side-branches with overlapping brown bracts at the base of each flower. The sepals are about 5.3 mm (0.21 in) long, and silky-hairy.

== Taxonomy ==
This species was first formally described in 1855 by William Jackson Hooker who gave it the name Cryptandra ulicina and published the description in his journal, The Journal of Botany. In 1863, George Bentham changed the name to Spyridium ulicinum in the Flora Australiensis. The specific epithet (ulicinum) means "Ulex-like".

== Distribution and habitat ==
Spyridium ulicinum is widespread but not common and grows in woodland in Tasmania.
