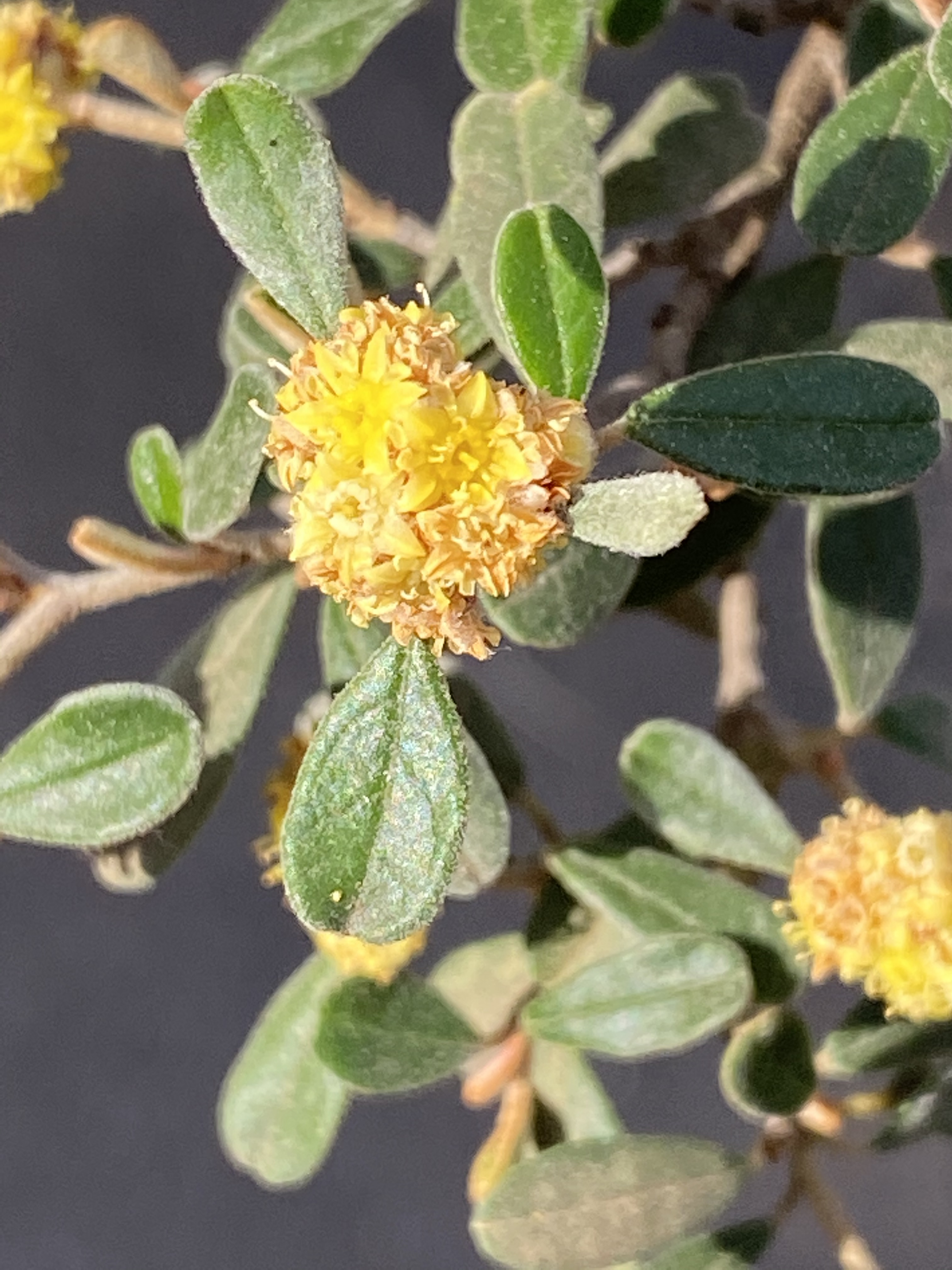
- Variety obovatum in the Australian National Botanic Gardens

Scientific classification
- Kingdom: Plantae
- Clade: Tracheophytes
- Clade: Angiosperms
- Clade: Eudicots
- Clade: Rosids
- Order: Rosales
- Family: Rhamnaceae
- Genus: Spyridium
- Species: S. obovatum

Binomial name
- Spyridium obovatum (Hook.f.) Benth.

Synonyms
- Cryptandra obovata (Hook.) Hook.f. nom. illeg.; Pomaderris obovata Hook.; Trymalium obovatum (Hook.) Reissek

= Spyridium obovatum =

Species of shrub

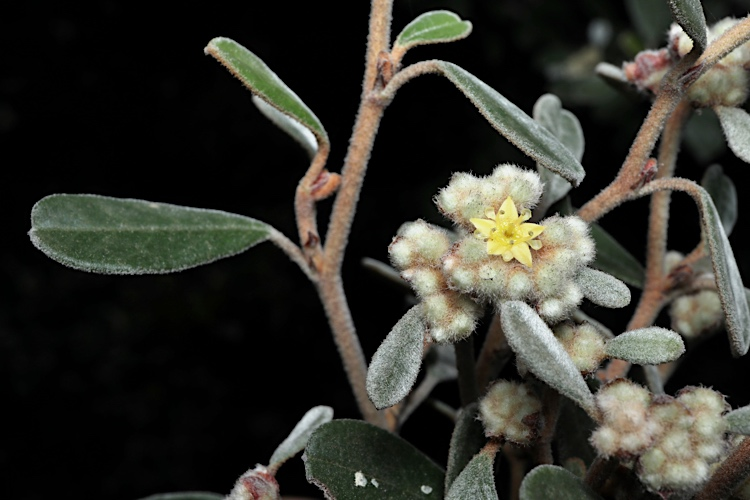
Variety velutinum in the Australian National Botanic Gardens

Spyridium obovatum is a species of flowering plant in the family Rhamnaceae and is endemic to Tasmania. It is an upright shrub that typically grows to a height of 0.9–2.5 m (2 ft 11 in – 8 ft 2 in) and has egg-shaped leaves, the narrower end towards the base, and about 13 mm (0.51 in) long. Small, compact heads of flowers are arranged on the ends of branchlets, the sepals either cream-coloured or yellow, depending on the variety.

This species was first formally described in 1836 by William Jackson Hooker who gave it the name Pomaderris obovata in his Companion to the Botanical Magazine. The type specimens were collected by Ronald Campbell Gunn, the species having been discovered by James Backhouse at the mouth of the "Meredith River, Swan Port", now Swansea. In 1863, George Bentham changed the name to Spyridium obovatum in Flora Australiensis.

In 1858, Siegfried Reissek described Trimalium velutinum in the journal Linnaea: Ein Journal für die Botanik in ihrem ganzen Umfange, oder Beiträge zur Pflanzenkunde from an unpublished description by Ferdinand von Mueller. In 1863, Bentham reduced the name to Spyridium obovatum var. velutinum (F.Muell. ex Reissek) Benth. in Flora Australiensis, and the name, and that of the autonym (Spyridium obovatum (Hook.) Benth. var. obovatum) are accepted by the Australian Plant Census.

The flowers of var. obovatum have cream-coloured sepals, and those of var. velutinum have yellow sepals.

Spyridium obcordatum is moderately widespread in Tasmania.
