= Spyridium scabridum =

Scientific classification
- Kingdom: Plantae
- Clade: Tracheophytes
- Clade: Angiosperms
- Clade: Eudicots
- Clade: Rosids
- Order: Rosales
- Family: Rhamnaceae
- Genus: Spyridium
- Species: S. scabridum

Binomial name
- Spyridium scabridum (Tate) Kellermann & W.R.Barker

Synonyms
- Cryptandra scabrida Tate; Spyridium halmaturinum var. scabridum (Tate) J.M.Black; Spyridium scabridum Tate nom. inval., pro syn.

Species of shrub

Spyridium scabridum is a species of flowering plant in the family Rhamnaceae and is endemic to Kangaroo Island in South Australia. It is a slender, erect shrub or small tree with oblong or narrowly egg-shaped leaves, and heads of sparsely hairy, white to cream-coloured flowers surrounded by densely hairy floral leaves.

== Description ==
Spyridium scabridum is a slender, erect shrub or small tree that typically grows to a height of up to 3 m (9.8 ft) and has densely hairy young stems. The leaves are oblong to narrowly egg-shaped with the narrower end towards the base, 5–11 mm (0.20–0.43 in) long and 1.5–2.8 mm (0.059–0.110 in) wide on a petiole 1.5–2 mm (0.059–0.079 in) long with sticky, egg-shaped stipules 3.0–3.5 mm (0.12–0.14 in) long at the base. The edges of the leaves are turned down or rolled under, the upper surface hairy at first, the lower surface felt-like and densely covered with star-shaped hairs. The heads of "flowers" are more or less sessile, 5–12 mm (0.20–0.47 in) in diameter and hairy, surrounded by 4 to 7 densely hairy floral leaves 4.0–7.3 mm (0.16–0.29 in) long and 2–4.3 mm (0.079–0.169 in) wide. Flowering occurs from September to November and the fruit is an oval capsule 1.7–2.0 mm (0.067–0.079 in) long.

== Taxonomy ==
This species was first formally described in 1889 by Ralph Tate who gave it the name Cryptandra scabrida in the Transactions, proceedings and report, Royal Society of South Australia. In 2012, Jürgen Kellermann and William Robert Barker changed the name to Spyridium scabridum in the Journal of the Adelaide Botanic Gardens. The specific epithet (scabridum) means "somewhat scabrous".

== Distribution and habitat ==
Spyridium scabridum grows in heath and open mallee scrubland on Kangaroo Island, mainly in the interior of the island.
