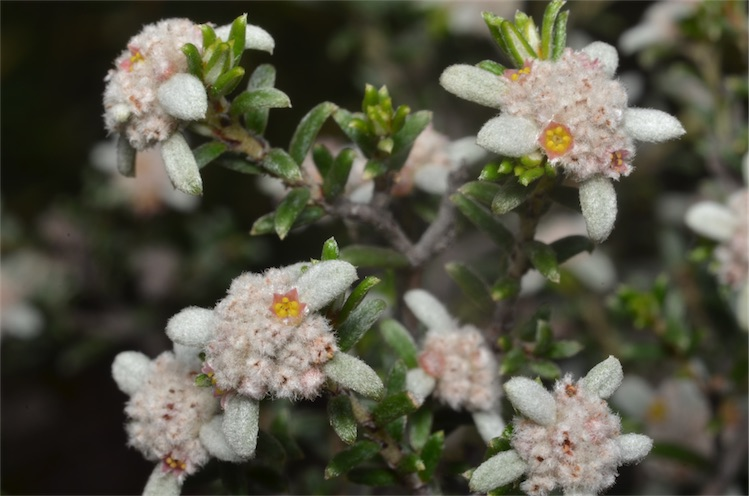

Scientific classification
- Kingdom: Plantae
- Clade: Tracheophytes
- Clade: Angiosperms
- Clade: Eudicots
- Clade: Rosids
- Order: Rosales
- Family: Rhamnaceae
- Genus: Spyridium
- Species: S. leucopogon

Binomial name
- Spyridium leucopogon (F.Muell. ex Reissek) F.Muell.

= Spyridium leucopogon =

Species of shrub

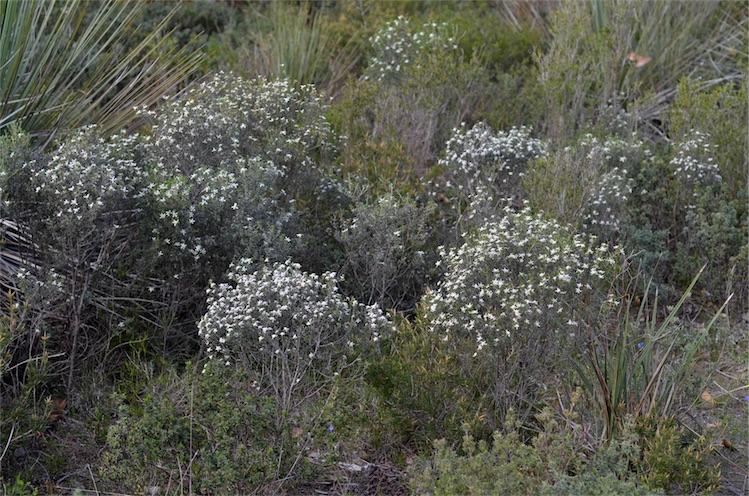
In the Wanilla Land Settlement Conservation Park

Spyridium leucopogon, commonly known as silvery spyridium, is a species of flowering plant in the family Rhamnaceae and is endemic to the Eyre Peninsula in South Australia. It is a small, slender shrub with narrowly linear leaves, and heads of woolly, white flowers.

== Description ==
Spyridium leucopogon is a small, slender shrub with more or less erect, sometimes crowded, narrowly linear leaves 3–6 mm (0.12–0.24 in) long and 0.5–0.75 mm (0.020–0.030 in) wide. The upper surface of the leaves is glabrous, the edges of the leaves are rolled under obscuring the lower surface, and there is a small, down-turned point on the tip. The heads of "flowers" are 5–10 mm (0.20–0.39 in) wide and surrounded by two or three woolly-white floral leaves. Flowering occurs from September to February.

== Taxonomy ==
This species was first formally described in 1858 by Siegfried Reissek who gave it the name Trymalium leucopogon in the journal Linnaea: ein Journal für die Botanik in ihrem ganzen Umfange, oder Beiträge zur Pflanzenkunde from an unpublished description by Ferdinand von Mueller. In 1875, von Mueller changed the name to Spyridium leucopogon in Fragmenta Phytographiae Australiae.

== Distribution and habitat ==
Spyridium leucopogon occurs on the Eyre Peninsula of South Australia.
