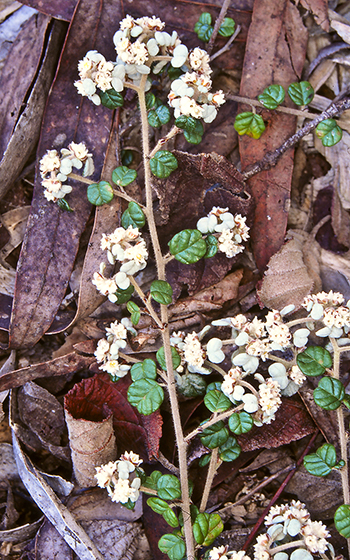
- In the Australian National Botanic Gardens

Scientific classification
- Kingdom: Plantae
- Clade: Tracheophytes
- Clade: Angiosperms
- Clade: Eudicots
- Clade: Rosids
- Order: Rosales
- Family: Rhamnaceae
- Genus: Spyridium
- Species: S. cinereum

Binomial name
- Spyridium cinereum N.A.Wakef.

= Spyridium cinereum =

Species of shrub

Spyridium cinereum, commonly known as tiny spiridium, is a species of flowering plant in the family Rhamnaceae and is endemic to south-eastern continental Australia. It is a low-lying shrub with heart-shaped leaves, the narrower end towards the base, and heads of whitish, shaggy-hairy flowers with brown bracts at the base of the heads.

== Description ==
Spyridium cinereum is a low-lying shrub or subshrub that typically grows to a height of 10–50 cm (3.9–19.7 in). The leaves are heart-shaped with the narrower end towards the base, 4–8 mm (0.16–0.31 in) long and 3–5 mm (0.12–0.20 in) wide with a small point in the centre of the notch. Both surfaces of the leaves are woolly-hairy, especially the upper surface, and the edges of the leaves are rolled under. The heads of flowers are arranged on the ends of branches, each with a leaf and several brown bracts at the base, the head in flattish umbels about 10 mm (0.39 in) in diameter. The sepals are about 1 mm (0.039 in) long, the petals whitish, 2–3 mm (0.079–0.118 in) long and shaggy-hairy on the outside. Flowering occurs from October to January and the fruit is a capsule about 2.5 mm (0.098 in) long.

== Taxonomy ==
Spyridium cinereum was first formally described in 1957 by Norman Arthur Wakefield in The Victorian Naturalist of specimens he collected near Mallacoota aerodrome. The specific epithet (cinereum) means "ash-coloured".

== Distribution ==
Spyridium cinereum grows in coastal heath and low scrub in disjunct populations near Nadgee in the far south-east of New South Wales, far north-eastern Victoria and in the north-east Grampians.
