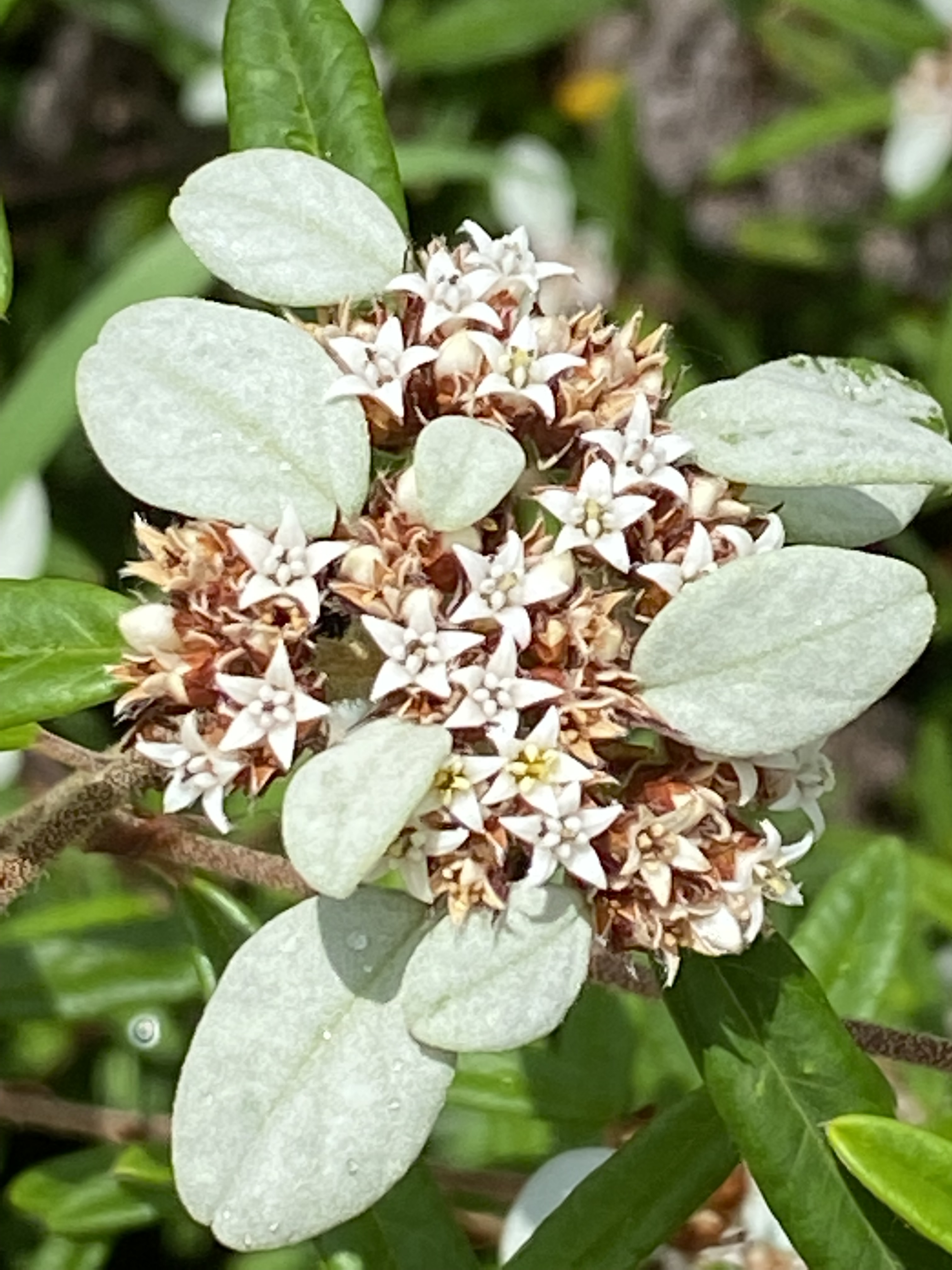

Scientific classification
- Kingdom: Plantae
- Clade: Tracheophytes
- Clade: Angiosperms
- Clade: Eudicots
- Clade: Rosids
- Order: Rosales
- Family: Rhamnaceae
- Genus: Spyridium
- Species: S. burragorang

Binomial name
- Spyridium burragorang K.R.Thiele

= Spyridium burragorang =

Species of plant

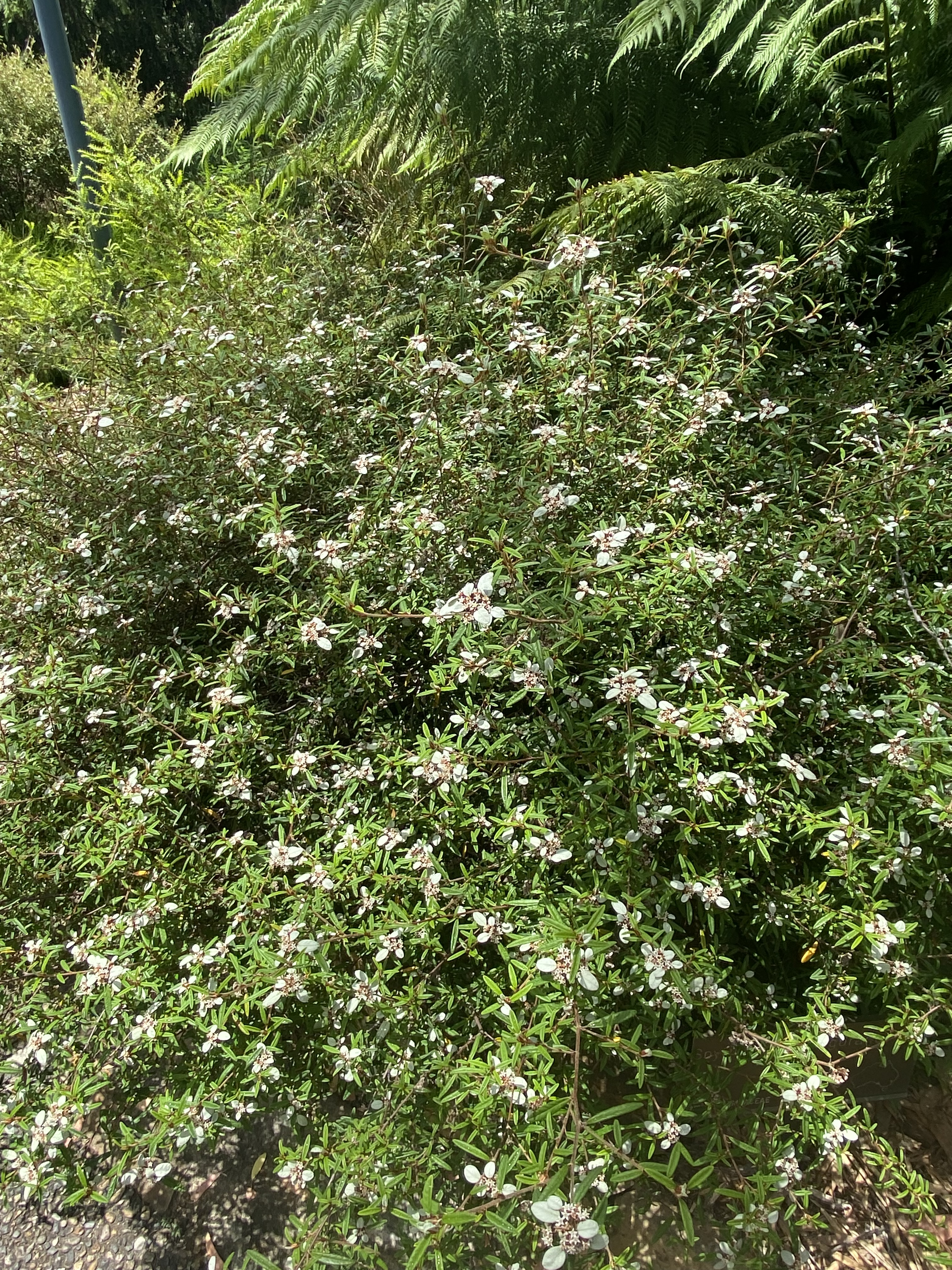
Habit

Spyridium burragorang, is a flowering shrub in the family Rhamnaceae. It has dense clusters of whitish flowers at the end of branches, alternate leaves and is endemic to New South Wales.

== Description ==
Spyridium burragorang is a spreading, multi-stemmed shrub that typically grows to a height of 0.2–1.5 m (7.9 in – 4 ft 11.1 in). The new growth stems are thickly covered with short, grey to yellowish star-shaped hairs intermixed with long, curved or zig-zag simple hairs. The leaves are arranged alternately, upper surface dark green, lower surface densely covered in short, soft, greyish star-shaped hairs, occasionally sparingly with more or less flattened hairs along the veins, midrib and leaf edges. The leaf base is wedge-shaped to rounded, apex blunt to rounded, minutely pointed or straight to curved, and the petiole 2–4 mm (0.079–0.157 in) long. The inflorescence is a terminal cluster or a loose grouping of 30-50 flowers with 2 to 4 oval to elliptic, whitish floral leaves. The white or cream flowers have five petals 0.6–0.7 mm (0.024–0.028 in) long, hypanthium tube 1.8–2.5 mm (0.071–0.098 in) long, 0.8–1.0 mm (0.031–0.039 in) in diameter, and covered with occasional greyish, soft hairs or densely covered in long, soft, straight hairs and the brown bracts about 4–5 mm (0.16–0.20 in) long. Flowering occurs in June and July, and the fruit is a dry, grey or black rounded capsule about 2 mm (0.079 in) long.

== Taxonomy and naming ==
Spyridium burragorang was first formally described in 2004 by Kevin Thiele and the description was published in Telopea. The specific epithet (burragorang) refers to the area where it was located near Lake Burragorang.

== Distribution and habitat ==
This spyridium is a rare species growing on dry ridges in bushland on shallow soil near Lake Burragorang, Wollondilly and near Cessnock.
