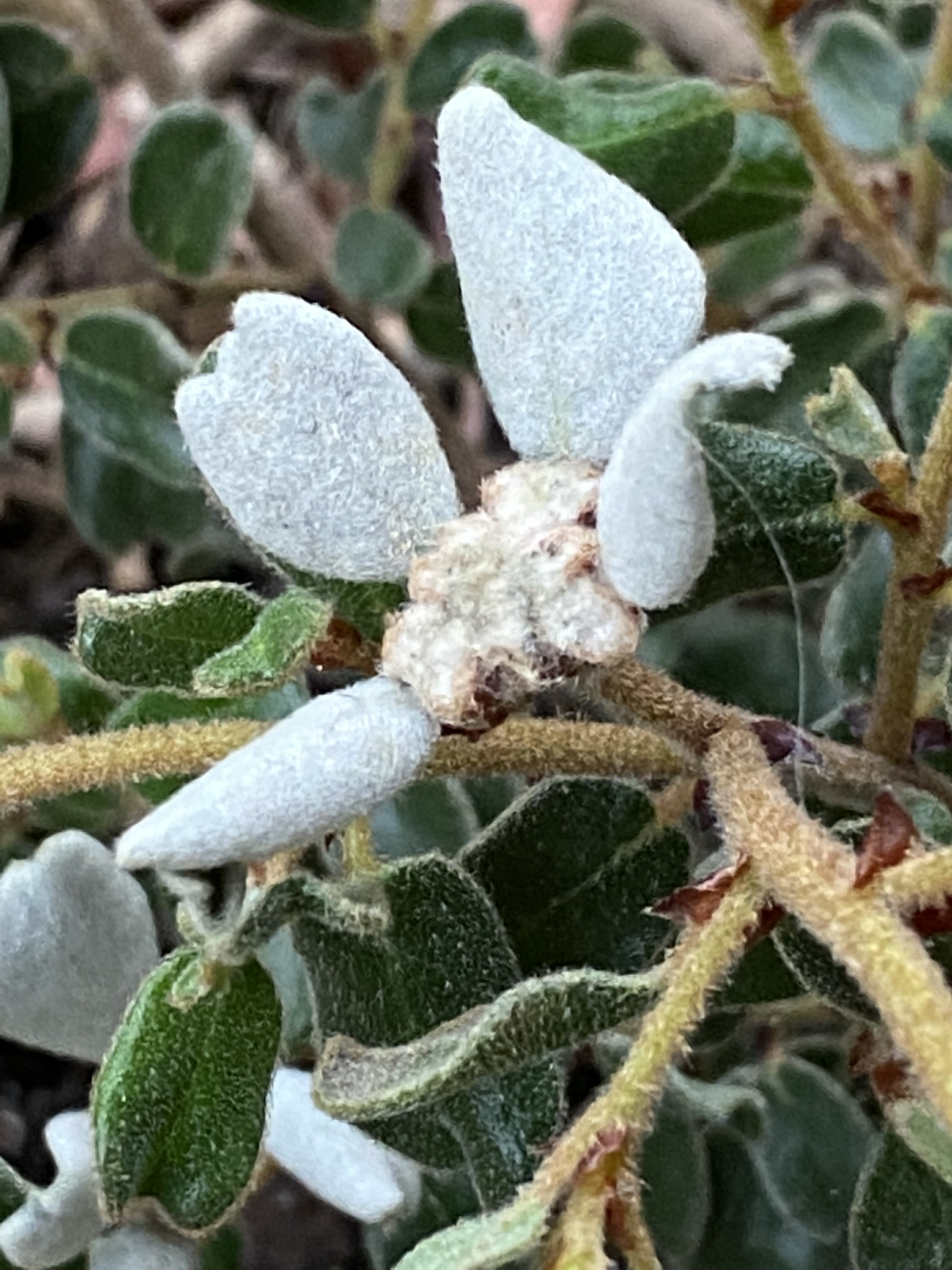

Scientific classification
- Kingdom: Plantae
- Clade: Tracheophytes
- Clade: Angiosperms
- Clade: Eudicots
- Clade: Rosids
- Order: Rosales
- Family: Rhamnaceae
- Genus: Spyridium
- Species: S. coactilifolium

Binomial name
- Spyridium coactilifolium Reissek S.

= Spyridium coactilifolium =

Species of shrub

Spyridium coactilifolium, commonly known as butterfly spyridium, is a species of flowering plant in the family Rhamnaceae. It has white-velvety flowers and oval shaped leaves that are thickly covered in soft hairs.

== Description ==
Spyridium coactilifolium is a small perennial shrub with rusty-coloured short, matted, dense hairs on the branches. The leaves are oval to egg-shaped, rounded at the base, blunt and notched at the apex, 6–15 mm (0.24–0.59 in) long and densely covered with soft, star-shaped hairs. The flower petals are velvety-white, usually 4 or 5, entire or notched at the apex and about 3 mm (0.12 in) long. The bracts are silky, brown, and egg-shaped with small hairs on the margins. Flowering occurs from December to February and the fruit is a brown capsule, egg-shaped with the narrower end at the base, hard, thin, brittle, smooth except near the base.

== Taxonomy and naming ==
Spyridium coactilifolium was first formally described in 1858 by Siegfried Reisseck and the description was published in Linnaea: ein Journal für die Botanik in ihrem ganzen Umfange, oder Beiträge zur Pflanzenkunde.

== Distribution and habitat ==
Butterfly spyridium mostly grows on rocky sea cliffs in low shrubland, and inland on sloping sites in sandy soils in low, open woodland in the Encounter Bay area on Fleurieu Peninsula in South Australia.

== Conservation status ==
Spyridium coactilifolium is classified as "vulnerable" by the National Parks and Wildlife Act 1972 in South Australia.
