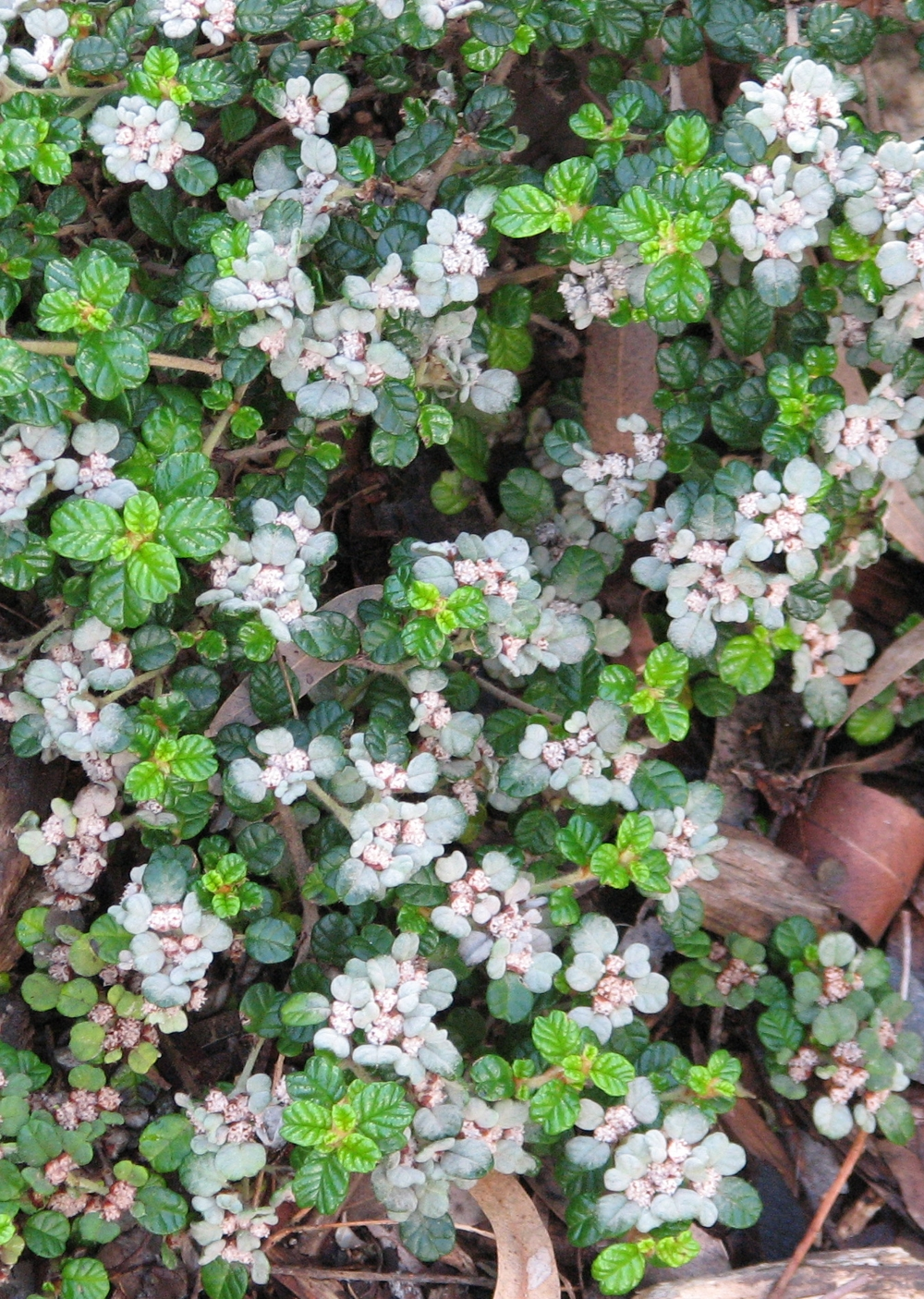
- Prostrate form

Scientific classification
- Kingdom: Plantae
- Clade: Tracheophytes
- Clade: Angiosperms
- Clade: Eudicots
- Clade: Rosids
- Order: Rosales
- Family: Rhamnaceae
- Genus: Spyridium
- Species: S. parvifolium

Binomial name
- Spyridium parvifolium (Hook.) F.Muell.

= Spyridium parvifolium =

Dusty Miller

Species of plant

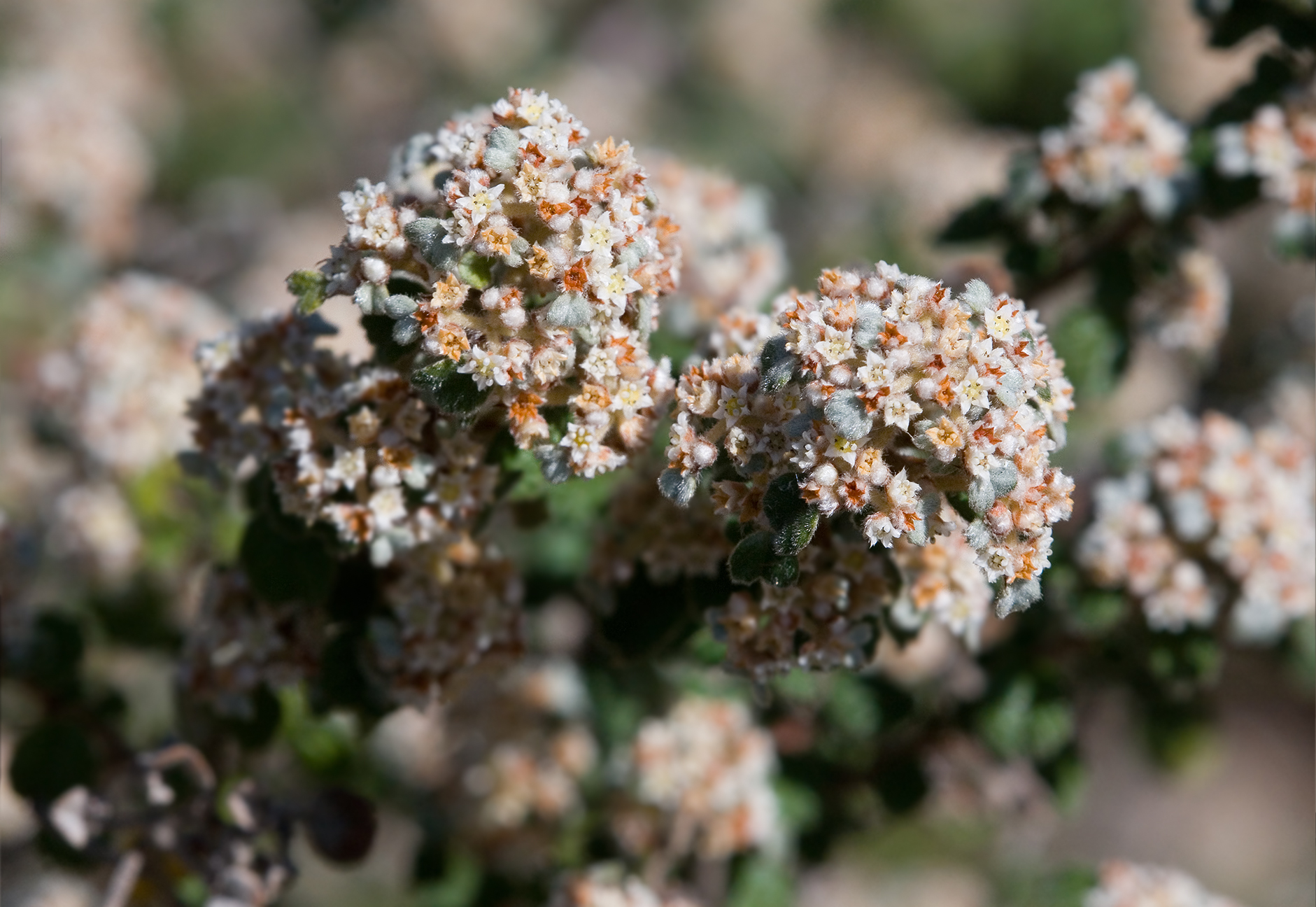
Spyridium parvifolium, Royal Tasmanian Botanical Gardens, Tasmania, Australia

Spyridium parvifolium, commonly known dusty miller, is a flowering plant in the family Rhamnaceae. It has dark green leaves and clusters of small, whitish flowers at the end of branches. It is widespread in eastern states of Australia.

== Description ==
Spyridium parvifolium is a low, spreading shrub to about 1.5 m (4 ft 11 in) high with smaller branches thickly covered in soft, long, rusty coloured hairs. The dull green leaves are obovate, elliptic or orb shaped, 4–18 mm (0.16–0.71 in) long, 3–13 mm (0.12–0.51 in) wide, and the apex rounded or notched. The upper surface usually veined, densely covered with long, erect, rigid hairs to densely covered with short, soft, upright hairs. The lower surface thickly covered with whitish star-shaped hairs, sometimes simple, rusty hairs over the veins, margins flat to curved under, occasionally scalloped. The leaves near the flowers are densely covered with white, short, matted hairs on the upper surface, stipules brown, 1–4 mm (0.039–0.157 in) long, 3–13 mm (0.12–0.51 in) wide and with very fine hairs. The flowers are in small heads, whitish, woolly, and borne in leafy clusters in leaf axils at the end of branches. The flower clusters about 3 cm (1.2 in) wide and surrounded by cream-white floral leaves. Flowering occurs mainly in spring and the fruit about 3 mm (0.12 in) long.

== Taxonomy and naming ==
Spyridium parvifolium was first formally described in 1862 by Ferdinand von Mueller and the description was published in Fragmenta Phytographiae Australiae. The specific epithet (parvifolium) means "small leaved".

== Distribution and habitat ==
Dusty miller grows on the tablelands and slopes in New South Wales south of Burrinjuck Dam and on the coast south of Twofold Bay. It also grows in Victoria, Tasmania and South Australia.

== Cultivation ==
Spyridium parvifolium has a degree of frost and drought tolerance, and adapts well to most soils and positions with adequate drainage. A prostrate form with the cultivar name 'Austraflora Nimbus', spreads to 1 metre across and is suited to coastal gardens, rockeries and containers.
