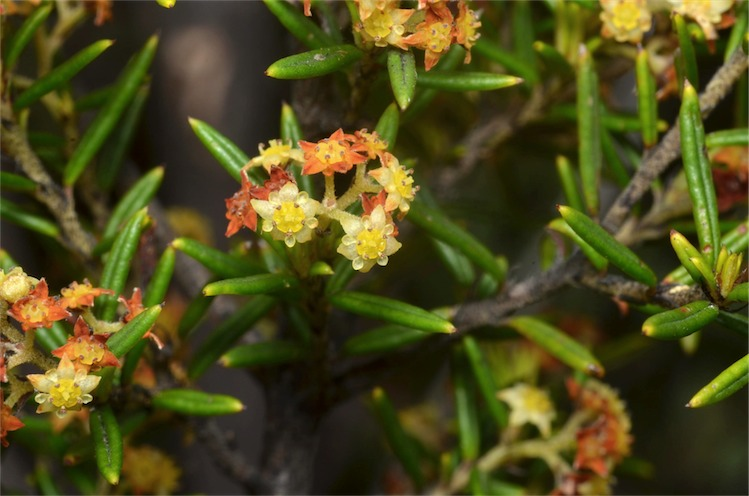
- In Grampians National Park

Scientific classification
- Kingdom: Plantae
- Clade: Tracheophytes
- Clade: Angiosperms
- Clade: Eudicots
- Clade: Rosids
- Order: Rosales
- Family: Rhamnaceae
- Genus: Spyridium
- Species: S. daltonii

Binomial name
- Spyridium daltonii (F.Muell.) Kellermann

= Spyridium daltonii =

Species of shrub

Spyridium daltonii is a species of flowering plant in the family Rhamnaceae and is endemic to Victoria in Australia. It is a shrub with softly-hairy branchlets, linear to narrowly elliptic leaves, and small groups of hairy, yellowish flowers.

== Description ==
Spyridium daltonii is a shrub that typically grows to a height of 0.8–3 m (2 ft 7 in – 9 ft 10 in), its branchlets covered with a soft layer of star-shaped hairs. The leaves are linear to narrowly elliptic, mostly 6–10 mm (0.24–0.39 in) long and about 1 mm (0.039 in) wide with stipules 1–3 mm (0.039–0.118 in) long at the base. The edges of the leaves are rolled under, the tip is sharply-pointed, the upper surface is glabrous and the lower surface is covered with star-shaped hairs. The heads of flowers arranged on the ends of branches and in upper leaf axils and are up to about 10 mm (0.39 in) in diameter with bracts at the base, the individual flowers more or less sessile, yellowish and densely hairy. The sepals are 1.0–1.4 mm (0.039–0.055 in) long and the petals about 0.7 mm (0.028 in) long. Flowering occurs from August to October and the fruit is a capsule about 3 mm (0.12 in) long.

== Taxonomy ==
This spyridium was first formally described in 1875 by Ferdinand von Mueller who gave it the name Trymalium daltonii in Fragmenta Phytographiae Australiae from specimens collected by St. Ely D'Alton. In 2006, Jürgen Kellermann changed the name to Spyridium daltonii in the journal Muelleria.

== Distribution ==
Spyridium daltonii grows in heathy woodland and is endemic to central areas of the Grampians in Victoria.
