= Petrophile phylicoides =

Scientific classification
- Kingdom: Plantae
- Clade: Tracheophytes
- Clade: Angiosperms
- Clade: Eudicots
- Order: Proteales
- Family: Proteaceae
- Genus: Petrophile
- Species: P. phylicoides

Binomial name
- Petrophile phylicoides R.Br.

Synonyms
- Petrophila ericifolia var. glabriflora Benth. orth. var.; Petrophila glabriflora Domin orth. var.; Petrophile ericifolia var. glabriflora Benth.; Petrophile glabriflora (Benth.) Domin

Species of shrub endemic to Western Australia

Petrophile phylicoides is a species of flowering plant in the family Proteaceae and is endemic to southwestern Western Australia. It is a shrub with short, needle-shaped, but not sharply-pointed leaves, and more or less spherical heads of glabrous yellow flowers.

== Description ==
Petrophile phylicoides is a shrub that typically grows to a height of 0.2–1.5 m (7.9 in – 4 ft 11.1 in) and has hoary young branchlets. The leaves are needle-shaped but not sharply-pointed, 6–15 mm (0.24–0.59 in) long and mostly curved upwards. The flowers are arranged on the ends of branchlets in sessile, more or less spherical heads about 10 mm (0.39 in) in diameter, with tapering involucral bracts at the base. The flowers are about 12 mm (0.47 in) long, glabrous and yellow. Flowering mostly occurs from September to December and the fruit is a nut, fused with others in a spherical head up to 28 mm (1.1 in) in diameter.

== Taxonomy ==
Petrophile phylicoides was first formally described in 1830 by Robert Brown in the Supplementum to his Prodromus Florae Novae Hollandiae et Insulae Van Diemen from material collected by William Baxter near Lucky Bay in 1823. The specific epithet (phylicoides) means "like a plant in the genus Phylica".

== Distribution and habitat ==
Petrophile phylicoides grows in shrubland and heath with in sandy-gravelly soils on sand plains and lateritic ridges in a wide area between the Stirling Range, Israelite Bay, Tarin Rock and Newdegate in the Avon Wheatbelt, Esperance Plains, Jarrah Forest and Mallee biogeographic regions.

== Conservation status ==
This petrophile is classified as "not threatened" by the Western Australian Government Department of Parks and Wildlife.
