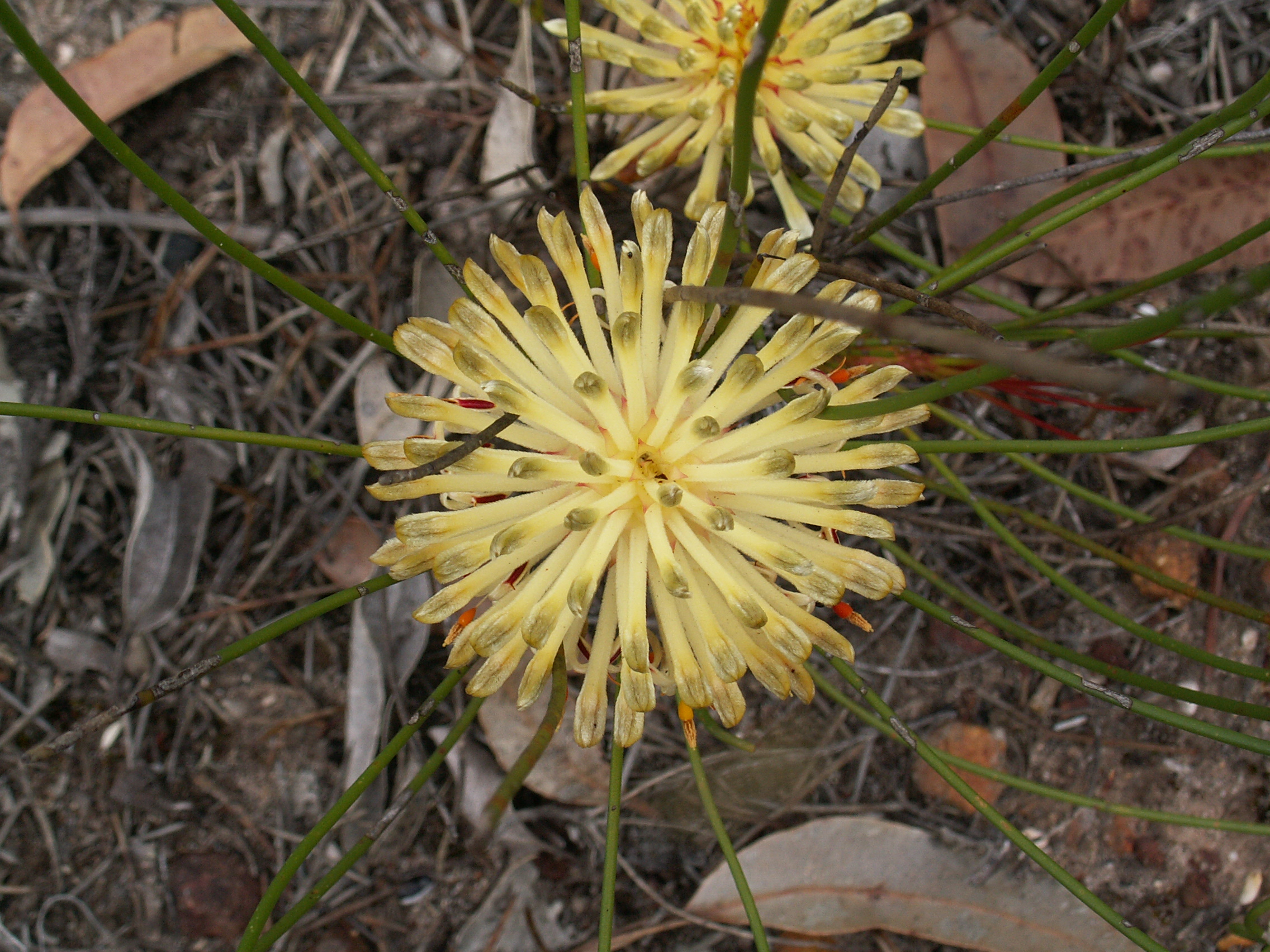
- P. longifolia in the Stirling Range.

Scientific classification
- Kingdom: Plantae
- Clade: Tracheophytes
- Clade: Angiosperms
- Clade: Eudicots
- Order: Proteales
- Family: Proteaceae
- Genus: Petrophile
- Species: P. longifolia

Binomial name
- Petrophile longifolia R.Br.

= Petrophile longifolia =

Long-leaved cone bush

Species of shrub native to the south west of Western Australia

Petrophile longifolia, commonly known as the long-leaved cone bush is a shrub which is native to the south west of Western Australia, growing between the city of Albany and the Stirling Range.

== Description ==
Petrophile longifolia is a ground-hugging shrub without a lignotuber, but with short stems and long (20–40 cm), thin cylindrical leaves with a sharp-pointed end. The flower heads are silky, cream in colour, 4–6 cm across, at the ends of short branches and surrounded by many short, pointed, leaf-like bracts. The flowers appear in late spring and early summer and are followed by long, oval-shaped fruits which, like others of the genus, only release their seeds after a fire or the death of the plant.

== Taxonomy and naming ==
Petrophile longifolia was first formally described in 1830 by Robert Brown from a specimen collected in 1829 near King George Sound by William Baxter. The description was published in Supplementum primum Prodromi florae Novae Hollandiae The specific epithet (longifolia) is derived from the Latin words longus meaning "long" and folium meaning "leaf".

== Distribution and habitat ==
Long-leaved cone bush is found in the Esperance Plains, Jarrah forest, Swan Coastal Plain and Warren biogeographical regions. It grows in sand, gravel, sandy loam or clay on sandplains.

== Cultivation ==
Petrophile longifolia, like others of its genus is not often cultivated but although it is a western species, is more reliable in humid east coast gardens than many others. It performs best in areas with dry summers and well drained soils in a sunny position.

== Conservation status ==
Petrophile longifolia is not threatened at present.
