= Hakea corymbosa =

Cauliflower hakea

Scientific classification
- Kingdom: Plantae
- Clade: Tracheophytes
- Clade: Angiosperms
- Clade: Eudicots
- Order: Proteales
- Family: Proteaceae
- Genus: Hakea
- Species: H. corymbosa

Binomial name
- Hakea corymbosa R.Br.
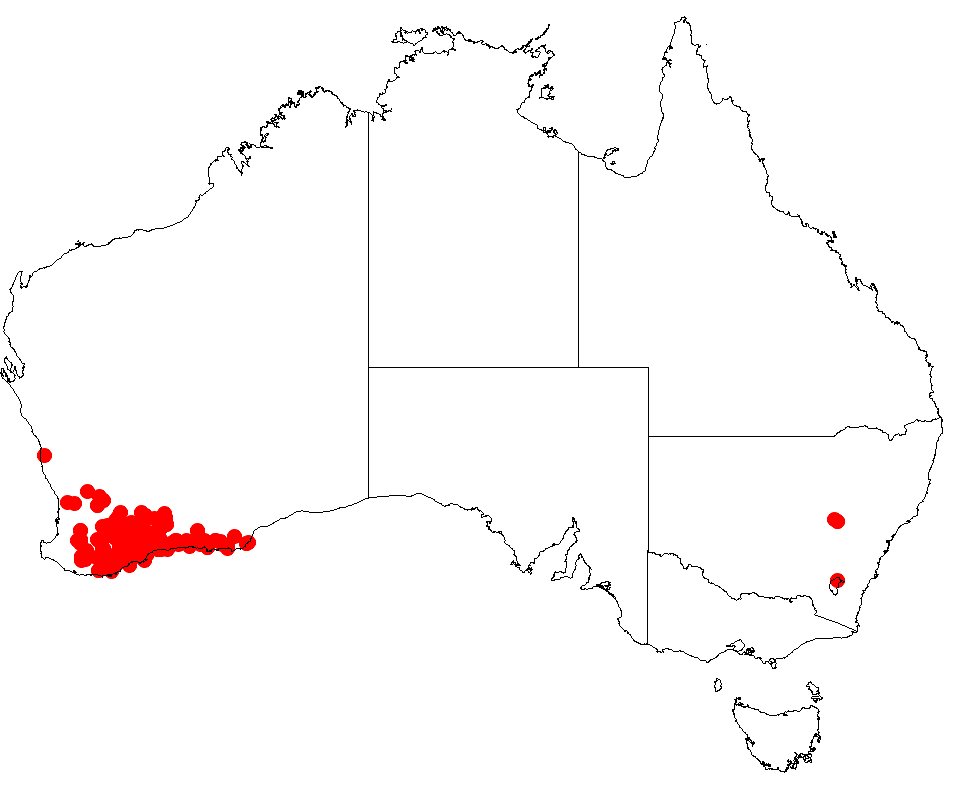
- Occurrence data from Australasian Virtual Herbarium

Species of plant endemic to Western Australia

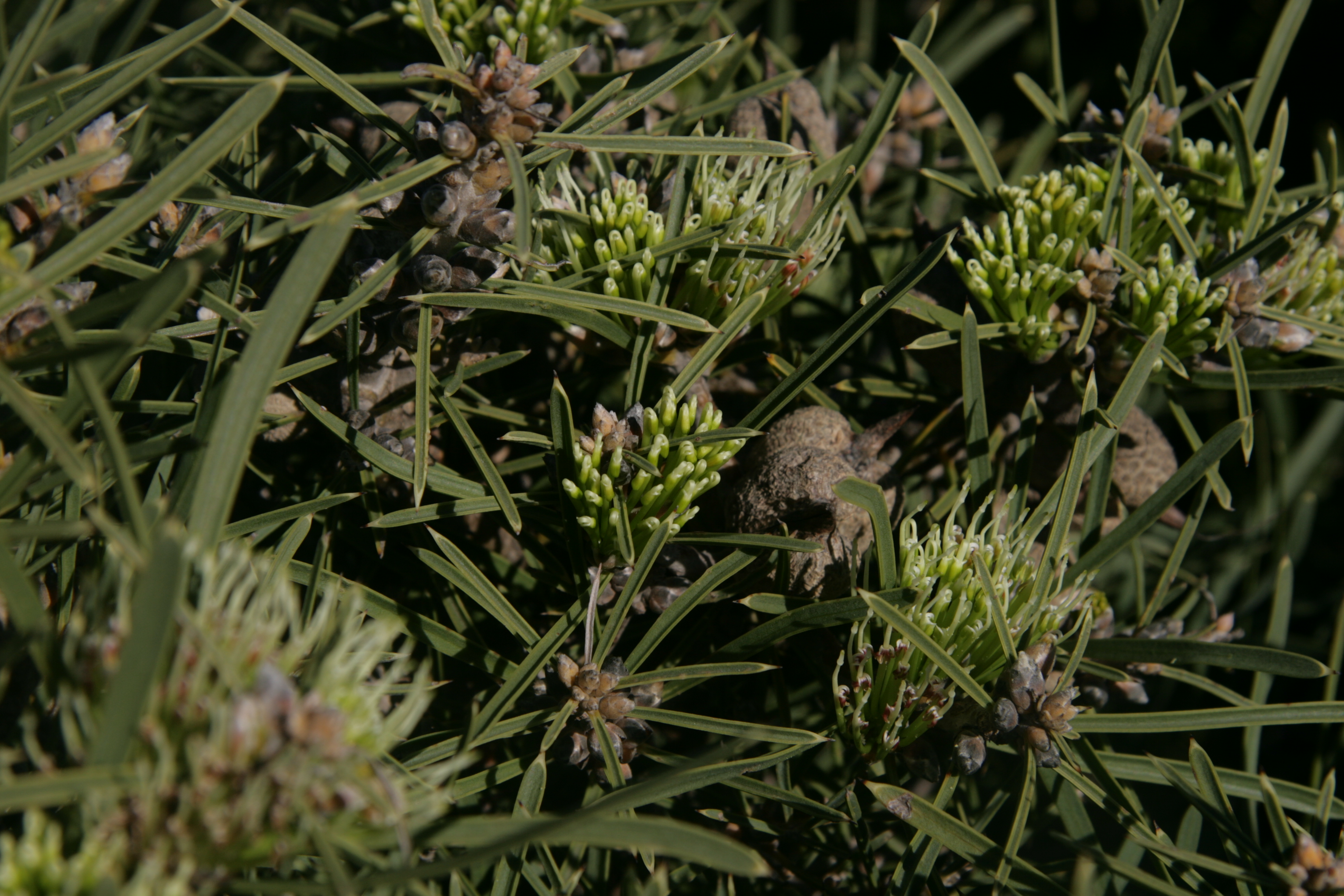
H. corymbosa flowers and foliage

Fruit

Hakea corymbosa, commonly known as the cauliflower hakea, is a species of flowering plant in the family Proteaceae which is endemic to the south-west of Western Australia. An attractive extremely prickly bush with sweetly scented yellowish flowers. The nectar-rich blooms and dense form provides a good habitat for wildlife.

== Description ==
Hakea corymbosa is a non lignotuberous erect multi-branched shrub growing to 0.5 to 2 metres (1.6 to 6.6 ft) high and 2.5–3 m (8–10 ft) wide. The young shoots are referred to as "water canes", when mature they develop into a new cluster of foliage. The shrub becomes extremely dense and prickly, the foliage appearing like clusters of "clouds". The narrow waxy leaves are 2.5 to 12 cm (1.0 to 4.7 in) long and 0.2 to 0.8 cm (0.079 to 0.315 in) wide on lower parts but whorled near the flowers. Leaves are alternately arranged along the stems with a distinct centre vein on the upper side and three on the underside ending in a sharp point. The inflorescence consists of 12-18 flowers appearing in profusion in leaf axils. The pedicel is 3.5–5 mm (0.1–0.2 in) long and smooth. The perianth is a pale yellow-green. Woody fruit have a roughish texture, broadly egg-shaped 2 to 3 centimetres (0.8 to 1.2 in) long and 1.5 cm (0.59 in) wide ending in a short sharp point without a beak. The winged seed measures 12–17 mm (0.47–0.67 in) long and 6.5–11 mm (0.26–0.43 in) wide.

== Taxonomy and naming ==
Hakea corymbosa was first formally described by the botanist Robert Brown in 1830 as part of the work Supplementum primum prodromi florae Novae Hollandiae. The type specimen had been collected at King George Sound by William Baxter in 1823. The specific epithet (corymbosa) is derived from the Latin corymbus meaning "bunch of flowers", "peak" or "top" referring to the flowers growing as a flat top or in a convex arrangement. A lignotuberous form with bright yellow flowers found north of Perth was classified as a separate species, Hakea eneabba.

== Distribution and habitat ==
Hakea corymbosa is native to the Great Southern, southern Wheatbelt and Goldfields-Esperance regions of Western Australia from Williams in the west, Albany in the south to Kondinin in the north and Cape Arid in the east. It is found in acid to slightly alkaline, sandy soils over or around laterite or granite, in heath or woodland.

== Use in horticulture ==
Hakea corymbosa can be grown in a sunny location in most soil types, preferring temperate climates receiving over 400 mm (16 in) rainfall a year. Plants in a shady spot tend to have elongated growth. It can be grown as a windbreak, hedge or for erosion control. Hakea corymbosa is recommended for attracting birds as it provides a dense safe haven with its prickly habit and nectar-rich flowers as a food source. Propagation is by seed, preferably gathered using gloves due to the prickliness of the foliage.
