= Cauliflower (disambiguation) =

Cauliflower is a type of vegetable.

Cauliflower may also refer to:

- Cauliflower ear, a condition of the ear
- Cauliflower nose, large, bulbous, ruddy appearance of the nose caused by granulomatous infiltration
- Cauliflower Hakea, a shrub which is endemic to the south-west of Western Australia
- Cauliflower mushroom, a genus of parasitic mushrooms characterised by cauliflower-like appearance
- Cauliflower cheese, a British dish based on cauliflower
- LNWR 18in Goods Class, a British steam locomotive class known as Cauliflowers
- Cauliflower (film), a 2021 Telugu spoof film

== See also ==
- Cauliflory, in botany
