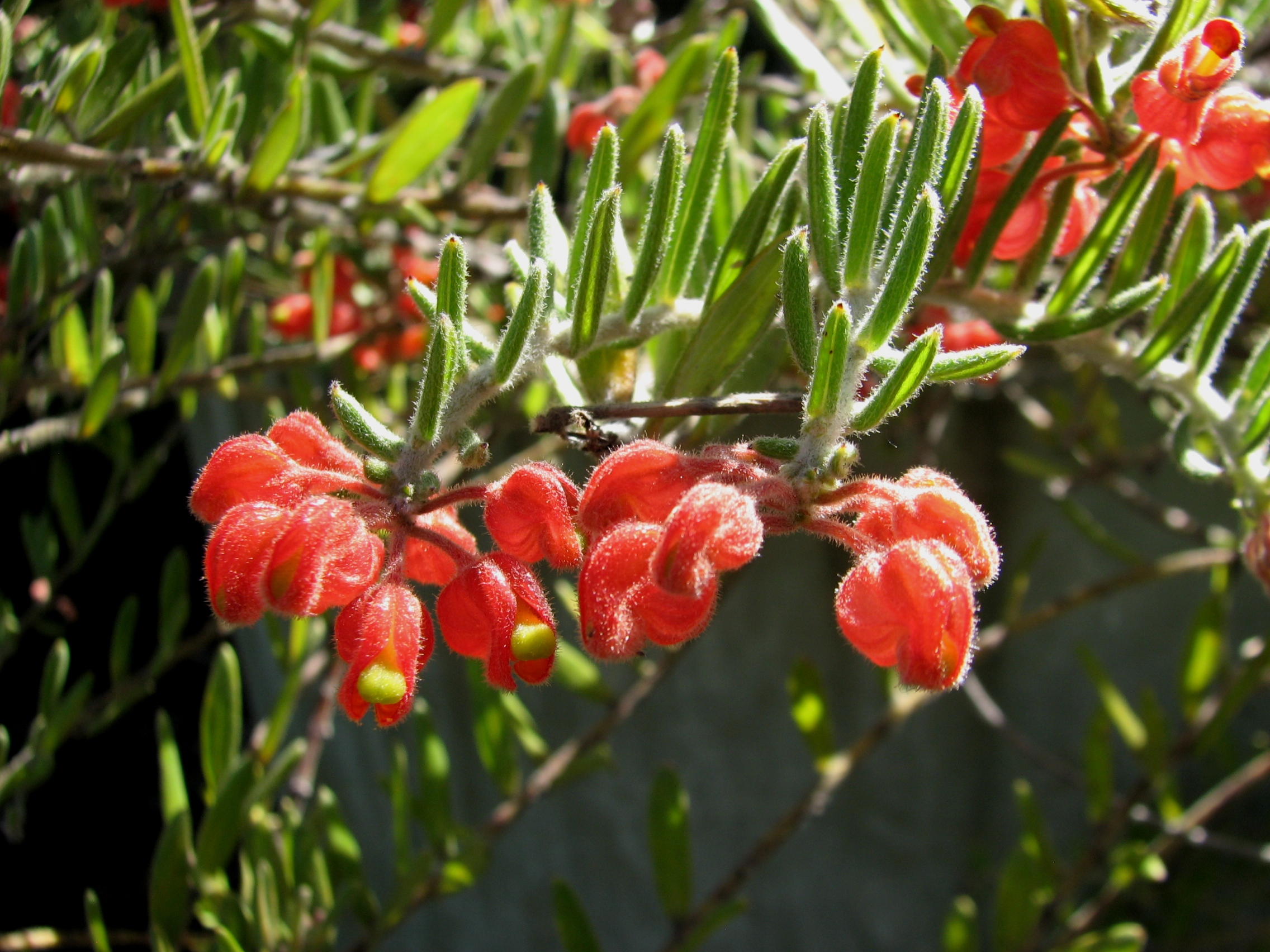
- In the Australian National Botanic Gardens

Conservation status
- Priority Four — Rare Taxa (DEC)

Scientific classification
- Kingdom: Plantae
- Clade: Embryophytes
- Clade: Tracheophytes
- Clade: Spermatophytes
- Clade: Angiosperms
- Clade: Eudicots
- Order: Proteales
- Family: Proteaceae
- Genus: Grevillea
- Species: G. saccata

Binomial name
- Grevillea saccata Benth.

= Grevillea saccata =

Species of shrub endemic to Western Australia

Grevillea saccata, commonly known as pouched grevillea, is a species of flowering plant in the family Proteaceae and is endemic to the south-west of Western Australia. It is a low, spreading to diffuse, scrambling or trailing shrub with linear to oblong or egg-shaped leaves with the narrower end towards the base, and small clusters of red and orange flowers with a lime-green style.

== Description ==
Grevillea saccata is a diffuse, scrambling or trailing shrub that typically grows to between 0.25 to 0.5 m (9.8 in to 1 ft 7.7 in) in height. Its leaves are linear to oblong or egg-shaped with the narrower end towards the base, mostly 10 to 50 mm (0.39 to 1.97 in) long and 1 to 5 mm (0.039 to 0.197 in) wide. The upper surface of the leaves is hairy, the edges are turned down or rolled under, and the lower surface is covered with shaggy hairs. The flowers are arranged in small clusters in leaf axils or on the ends of branches on a rachis 1–2 mm (0.039–0.079 in) long, and are red and orange with a lime-green style, the pistil 7–9 mm (0.28–0.35 in) long. Flowering occurs from June to November and the fruit is a softly-hairy, oval follicle 13–16 mm (0.51–0.63 in) long.

This grevillea is similar to G. fasciculata, G. crassifolia and G. depauperata.

== Taxonomy ==
This species was formally described in 1870 by English botanist George Bentham in Flora Australiensis. The specific epithet (saccata) is a Latin word meaning "pouched", referring to the base of the flowers.

== Distribution ==
Pouched grevillea grows in woodland or open heath, sometimes in swampy places, in sandy to clayey soils on laterite and is restricted to the area between Mullering Brook in Badgingarra National Park, Dandaragan and just north of the Hill River, in the Geraldton Sandplains and the Swan Coastal Plain bioregions of south-western Western Australia.

== Conservation status ==
Grevillea saccata is listed as "Priority Four" by the Government of Western Australia Department of Biodiversity, Conservation and Attractions, meaning that it is rare or near threatened.

== See also ==
- List of Grevillea species
