= Persoonia striata =

Scientific classification
- Kingdom: Plantae
- Clade: Tracheophytes
- Clade: Angiosperms
- Clade: Eudicots
- Order: Proteales
- Family: Proteaceae
- Genus: Persoonia
- Species: P. striata

Binomial name
- Persoonia striata R.Br.

Synonyms
- Linkia striata (R.Br.) Kuntze

Species of flowering plant

Persoonia striata is a species of flowering plant in the family Proteaceae and is endemic to the south-west of Western Australia. It is an erect, often spreading shrub with hairy young branchlets, linear to spatula-shaped leaves, and bright yellow flowers borne in groups of up to five on a rachis up to 2 mm (0.079 in) long that continues to grow after flowering.

== Description ==
Persoonia striata is an erect, often spreading shrub that typically grows to a height of 15–70 cm (5.9–27.6 in) and has branches covered with whitish or greyish hairs when young. The leaves are linear to spatula-shaped, 10–45 mm (0.39–1.77 in) long and 0.7–2.7 mm (0.028–0.106 in) wide with three parallel ridges on both sides. The flowers are arranged in groups of up to five on a rachis up to 2 mm (0.079 in) long that usually continues to grow after flowering, each flower on a pedicel 2.5–9 mm (0.098–0.354 in) long with a scale leaf at its base. The tepals are bright yellow, 8.5–12.5 mm (0.33–0.49 in) long and glabrous. Flowering occurs from November to December.

== Taxonomy ==
Persoonia striata was first formally described in 1830 by Robert Brown in the Supplementum to his Prodromus Florae Novae Hollandiae et Insulae Van Diemen from specimens collected in 1829 near "King George's Sound" by William Baxter.

== Distribution and habitat ==
This geebung grows in heath in the area between Lake Hope, Dumbleyung and Albany in the Avon Wheatbelt, Coolgardie, Esperance Plains, Jarrah Forest and Mallee biogeographic regions in the south-west of Western Australia.
