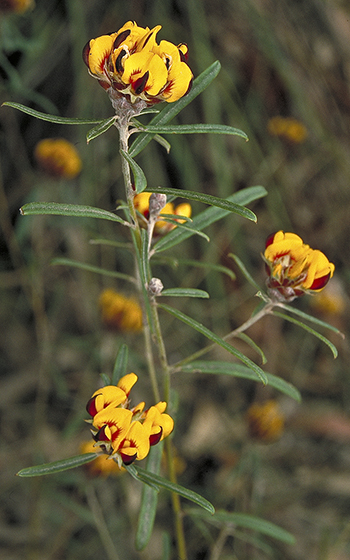

Scientific classification
- Kingdom: Plantae
- Clade: Tracheophytes
- Clade: Angiosperms
- Clade: Eudicots
- Clade: Rosids
- Order: Fabales
- Family: Fabaceae
- Subfamily: Faboideae
- Genus: Pultenaea
- Species: P. rosmarinifolia

Binomial name
- Pultenaea rosmarinifolia Lindl.

Synonyms
- Pultenaea rosmarinifolia Sieber ex DC. nom. inval., pro syn.; Pultenaea rosmarinifolia Endl. nom. illeg.

= Pultenaea rosmarinifolia =

Species of legume

Pultenaea rosmarinifolia, commonly known as rosemary bush-pea, is a species of flowering plant in the family Fabaceae and is endemic to eastern New South Wales. It is an erect shrub with linear to elliptic leaves with the narrower end towards the base, and yellow and red to purplish flowers.

== Description ==
Pultenaea rosmarinifolia is an erect shrub that typically grows to a height of 1.8–3.0 m (5 ft 11 in – 9 ft 10 in) and has stems with hairs pressed against the surface. The leaves are arranged alternately, linear to elliptic with the narrower end towards the base, mostly 20–45 mm (0.79–1.77 in) long and 2–4 mm (0.079–0.157 in) wide on a petiole 0.5–1.2 mm (0.020–0.047 in) long with stipules 2–8 mm (0.079–0.315 in) long at the base. The edges of the leaves curve downwards or are rolled under and there is a short, often down-curved point on the tip. The flowers are arranged in dense clusters on the ends of branches and are about 10 mm (0.39 in) long on pedicels up to 1–3 mm (0.039–0.118 in) long. There are overlapping, egg-shaped to more or less round bracts at the base of the pedicels and narrow egg-shaped bracteoles 3–4 mm (0.12–0.16 in) long on the side of the sepal tube. The sepals are about 7 mm (0.28 in) long and joined at the base, the upper lobes 1.0–2.5 mm (0.039–0.098 in) long and 2.5–3 mm (0.098–0.118 in) wide, the lower lobes shorter and narrower. The standard petal is yellow with a red base and up to 12 mm (0.47 in) long, the wings are yellow with red or brownish marks and 2.5 mm (0.098 in) wide and the keel is red and 3.5 mm (0.14 in) wide. Flowering mainly occurs from September to October and the fruit is an elliptic pod 10–15 mm (0.39–0.59 in) long.

== Taxonomy ==
Pultenaea rosmarinifolia was first formally described in 1833 by John Lindley in Edwards's Botanical Register from specimens raised in Clapton Nursery in London from seed collected by "Mr. Baxter" on the south coast of "New Holland". The specific epithet (rosmarinifolia) means "Rosmarinus-leaved".

== Distribution and habitat ==
This species of Pultenaea grows in heathland and forest on the coast and nearby ranges of New South Wales, from near Newcastle to Bawley Point.
