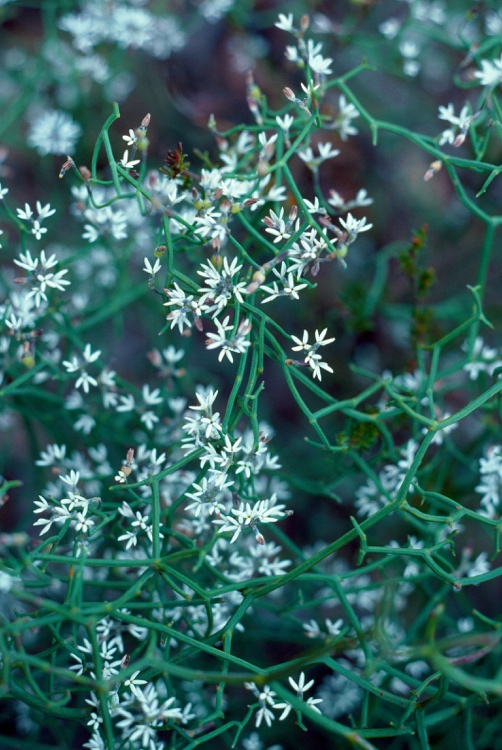

Scientific classification
- Kingdom: Plantae
- Clade: Tracheophytes
- Clade: Angiosperms
- Clade: Eudicots
- Order: Proteales
- Family: Proteaceae
- Genus: Conospermum
- Species: C. flexuosum

Binomial name
- Conospermum flexuosum R.Br.

= Conospermum flexuosum =

Species of shrub native to Australia

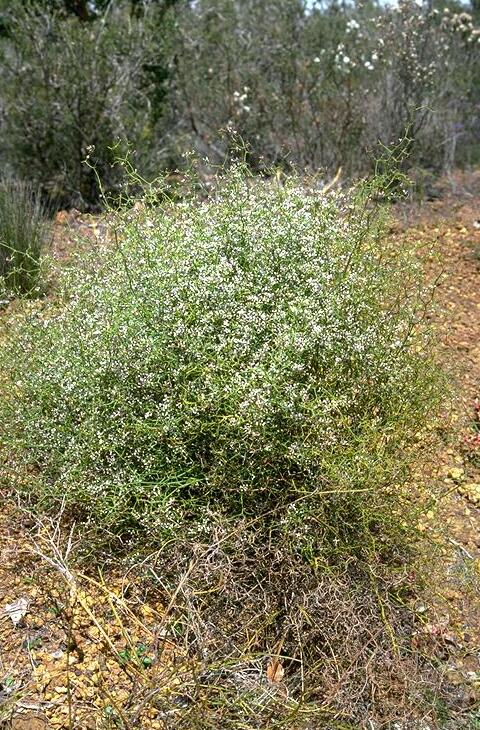
Habit

Conospermum flexuosum, commonly known as the tangled smokebush, is a species of flowering plant in the family Proteaceae and is endemic to the south-west of Western Australia. It is a sprawling shrub with many zig-zag branches, panicles of white to pale blue, tube-shaped flowers and urn-shaped, hairy nuts.

== Description ==
Conospermum flexuosum is a sprawling shrub that typically grows to a height of up to 0.2–1.5 m (7.9 in – 4 ft 11.1 in) and has many zig-zag or winding branches. The leaves are clustered at the base of the plant, spatula-shaped, square or almost circular in cross-section, 65–240 mm (2.6–9.4 in) long and 4–17 mm (0.16–0.67 in) wide on a petiole 17–70 mm (0.67–2.76 in) long. Older plants are often leafless. The flowers are borne in branching panicles with heads of 3 to 7 flowers on the ends with brownish-blue bracteoles 1.5–2.5 mm (0.059–0.098 in) long with velvety hairs. The perianth is tube-shaped, 2.0–3.5 mm (0.079–0.138 in) long and white to pale blue with woolly white or rust-coloured hairs, the lobes 2–4 mm (0.079–0.157 in) long and 0.5–1 mm (0.020–0.039 in) wide. Flowering occurs from May to October, and the fruit is an urn-shaped nut, 2.5–3.0 mm (0.098–0.118 in) long and 1.75–2.5 mm (0.069–0.098 in) wide and covered with soft, brown, red or white hairs.

== Taxonomy ==
Conospermum flexuosum was first formally described in 1830 by Robert Brown in his Supplementum primum Prodromi florae Novae Hollandiae from specimens collected near King George Sound by William Baxter. The specific epithet (flexuosum) means 'flexuose' or 'zig-zag', referring to the branching habit.

=== Subspecies ===
In 1995, Eleanor Marion Bennett described two subspecies of Conospermum flexuosum in the Flora of Australia, and the names are accepted by the Australian Plant Census:

- Conospermum flexuosum R.Br. subsp. flexuosum has tuberculate branches with 4 to 6 ridges, with veins between the tubercules.
- Conospermum flexuosum subsp. laevigatum (Meisn.)E.M.Benn. (previously known as Conospermum flexuosum var. laevigatum Meisn.) has branches without tubercules, and 8 to 12 ribs.

== Distribution and habitat ==
Conospermum flexuosum is found in sand pockets among granite outcrops, on winter-wet flat areas and along roadsides in the Esperance Plains, Jarrah Forest, Swan Coastal Plain and Warren bioregions of south-west Western Australia. Subspecies flexuosum occurs near Albany, south of the Stirling Range and east to Wellstead, but subsp, laevigatum mostly occurs between Capel and Busselton, and east to Nannup.

== Conservation status ==
Both subspecies of C. flexuosum are listed as "not threatened" by the Government of Western Australia Department of Biodiversity, Conservation and Attractions.
