= C. neglecta =

C. neglecta may refer to:

- Castilleja neglecta, the Tiburon Indian paintbrush, an endangered perennial plant species
- Catocala neglecta, a moth species found in Mongolia
- Celastrina neglecta, the summer azure, a butterfly species found in North America
- Cernuella neglecta, the dune snail, a small air-breathing land snail species
- Crocidura neglecta, the neglected shrew, a mammal species endemic to Indonesia

== Synonyms ==
- Calamagrostis neglecta, a synonym for Calamagrostis stricta, a grass species native to wetlands of the Holarctic Kingdom
- Correa neglecta, a synonym for Correa pulchella, a small shrub species endemic to South Australia

== See also ==
- Neglecta (disambiguation)
