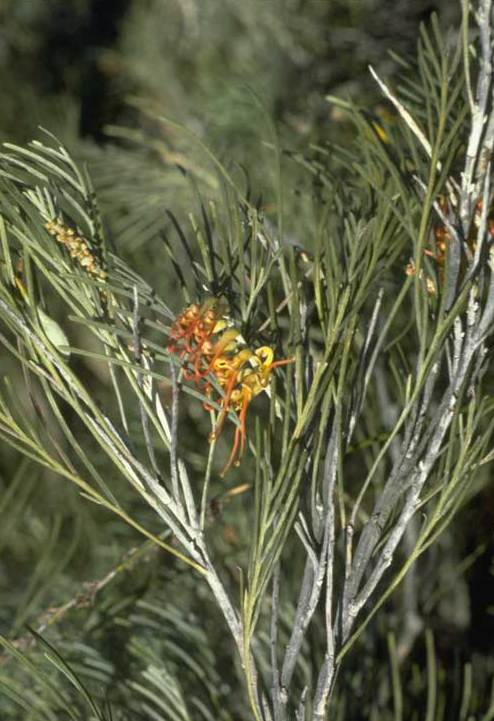

Conservation status
- Priority Four — Rare Taxa (DEC)

- Least Concern (IUCN 3.1)

Scientific classification
- Kingdom: Plantae
- Clade: Embryophytes
- Clade: Tracheophytes
- Clade: Spermatophytes
- Clade: Angiosperms
- Clade: Eudicots
- Order: Proteales
- Family: Proteaceae
- Genus: Grevillea
- Species: G. baxteri

Binomial name
- Grevillea baxteri R.Br.

= Grevillea baxteri =

Cape Arid grevillea

Species of shrub endemic to Western Australia

Grevillea baxteri, commonly known as the Cape Arid grevillea, is a flowering plant of the family Proteaceae and is endemic to the south-west of Western Australia. It is an erect to spreading shrub with pinnatipartite leaves and greenish to fawn or creamy-orange flowers.

== Description ==
Grevillea baxteri is an erect to spreading shrub that typically grows to a height of 0.8–3.6 m (2 ft 7 in – 11 ft 10 in). Its leaves are pinnatipartite with seven to fifteen linear lobes, the ultimate lobes 40–80 mm (1.6–3.1 in) long and 1.0–1.5 mm (0.039–0.059 in) wide with the edges rolled under. The flowers are greenish to fawn or creamy orange, on a rachis 4–85 mm (0.16–3.35 in) long and covered with silky or felty hairs. The pistil is 22–25 mm (0.87–0.98 in) long, and the style is hairy. Flowering occurs in most months with a peak from July to November and the fruit is a follicle 14.0–15.5 mm (0.55–0.61 in) long.

== Taxonomy ==
Grevillea baxteri was first formally described in 1830 by Robert Brown in his Supplementum primum prodromi florae Novae Hollandiae. The specific epithet (baxteri) honours William Baxter.

== Distribution and habitat ==
Cape Arid grevillea grows on sandplains in heath and mallee from near Scaddan to Israelite Bay in the Esperance Plains and Mallee biogeographic regions of south-western Western Australia.

== Conservation status ==
This grevillea is listed as priority four by the Government of Western Australia Department of Biodiversity, Conservation and Attractions, meaning that is rare or near threatened. It is also listed as least concern on the International Union for Conservation of Nature's Red List. Although it has a restricted distribution and is considered uncommon or rare, its population is believed to be stable, its occurrence is mostly within protected areas and there are no currently known threats to the population.
