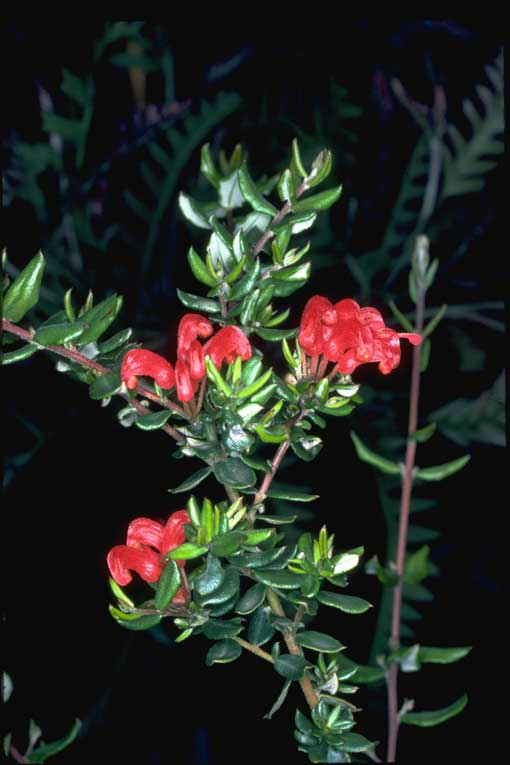

Conservation status
- Least Concern (IUCN 3.1)

Scientific classification
- Kingdom: Plantae
- Clade: Embryophytes
- Clade: Tracheophytes
- Clade: Spermatophytes
- Clade: Angiosperms
- Clade: Eudicots
- Order: Proteales
- Family: Proteaceae
- Genus: Grevillea
- Species: G. depauperata

Binomial name
- Grevillea depauperata R.Br.

Synonyms
- Grevillea brownii Meisn.

= Grevillea depauperata =

Species of shrub native to Western Australia

Grevillea depauperata is a species of flowering plant in the family Proteaceae and is endemic to the south-west of Western Australia. It is a low, dense, spreading shrub with oblong or egg-shaped leaves and clusters of red to orange flowers.

== Description ==
Grevillea depauperata is a low, dense, spreading or prostrate shrub that typically grows to a height of 20–80 cm (7.9–31.5 in). Its leaves are oblong or egg-shaped, 6–30 mm (0.24–1.18 in) long and 1.5–10 mm (0.059–0.394 in) wide with the edges curved down or rolled under. The upper surface of the leaves is glabrous and glossy, the lower surface densely hairy. The flowers are arranged on the ends of branches and in leaf axils in erect groups of up to eight on a rachis 0.5–1 mm (0.020–0.039 in) long, the pistil 11.0–15.5 mm (0.43–0.61 in) long. The flowers are red to orange and woolly hairy on the outside. Flowering mostly occurs from May to October and the fruit is an oval follicle about 15 mm (0.59 in) long.

== Taxonomy ==
Grevillea depauperata was first formally described in 1830 by Robert Brown in the Supplementum primum prodromi florae Novae Hollandiae from specimens collected by William Baxter near King George Sound in 1829. The specific epithet (depauperata) means "reduced", referring to the habit of the plant.

== Distribution and habitat ==
Grevillea depauperata grows in woodland between Albany, Cranbrook and Manjimup in the Esperance Plains and Jarrah Forest biogeographic regions of south-western Western Australia.

== Conservation status ==
This grevillea is listed as least concern on the IUCN Red List of Threatened Species and as not threatened by the Department of Biodiversity, Conservation and Attractions.
