= James Anderson (botanical collector) =

Scottish botanical collector (1797–1842)

James Anderson (1797 – 22 April 1842) was a Scottish botanical collector who later became the superintendent of the Sydney Botanic Gardens.

== Early life ==
Anderson was born in Boquhan near Stirling in Scotland in 1797.

== Plant collecting ==
Between 1826 and 1830 Anderson sailed on HMS Adventure, collecting seeds and dried specimens. This voyage, to the Straits of Magellan and the coast of South America, was captained by Phillip Parker King. A collection of dried specimens was submitted to the British Museum after the voyage.

He collected many South American species for the Clapton Nursery in London on behalf of Hugh Low and John Bain Mackay including the following:

- Francoa appendiculata, Chiloé, Chile
- Herbertia pulchella, Bay of Maldonado. Uruguay
- Libertia chilensis (syn. Libertia formosa) "from near the southern extremity of the continent of America" (introduced from seed)
- Solanum crispum, Chiloé, Chile (introduced 1830)

He also sent plant specimens to William Hooker at Glasgow University.

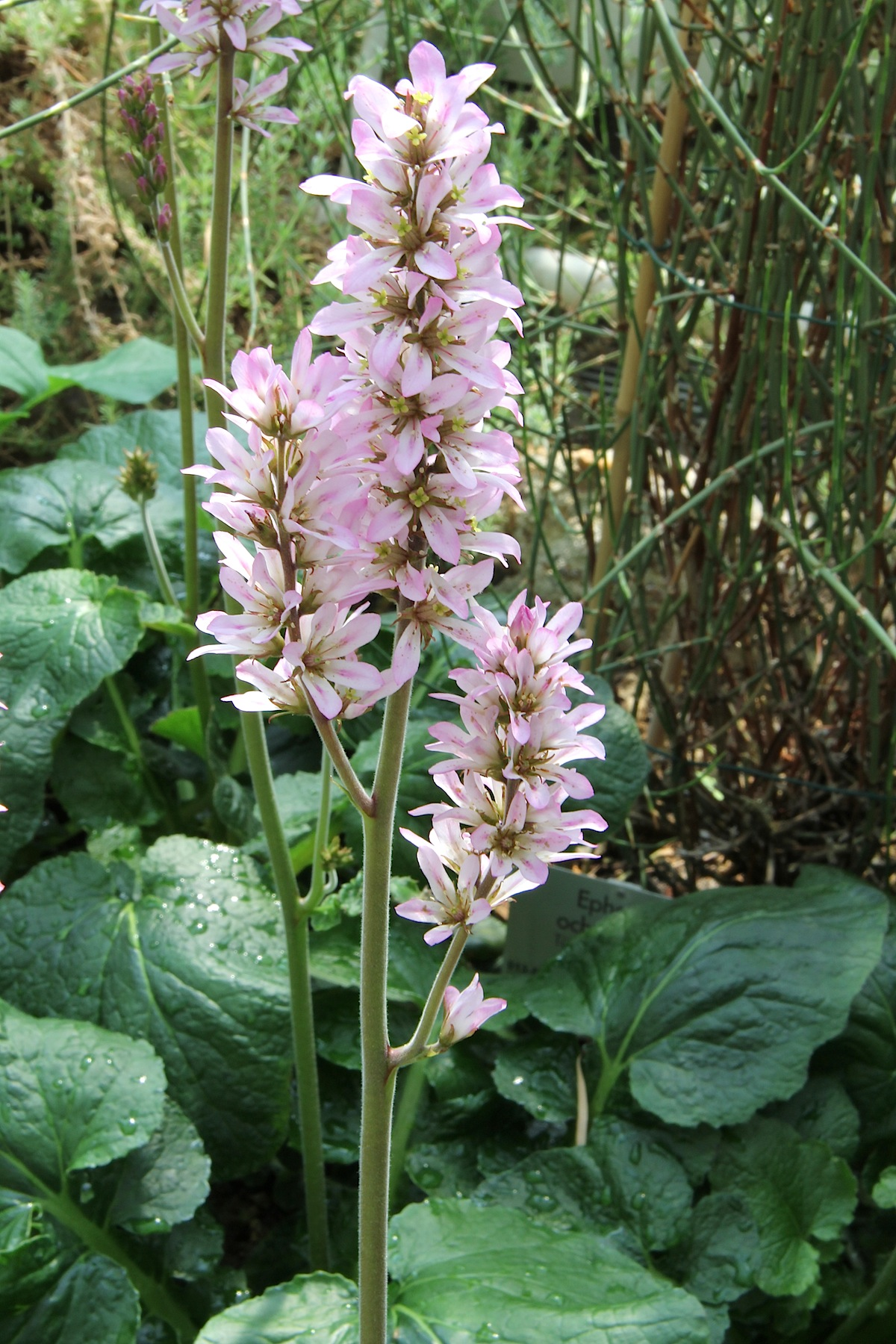
Francoa appendiculata

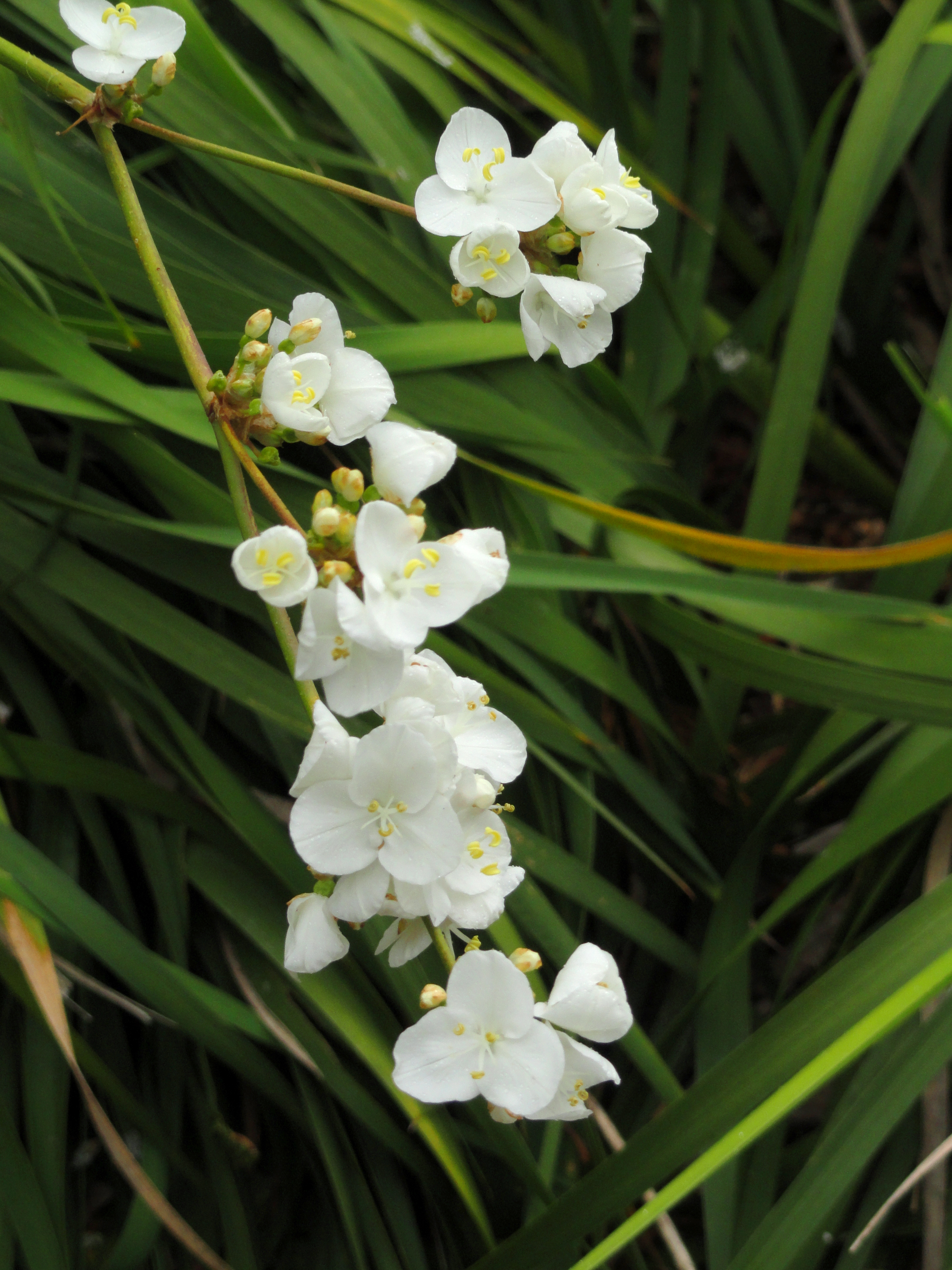
Libertia chinensis

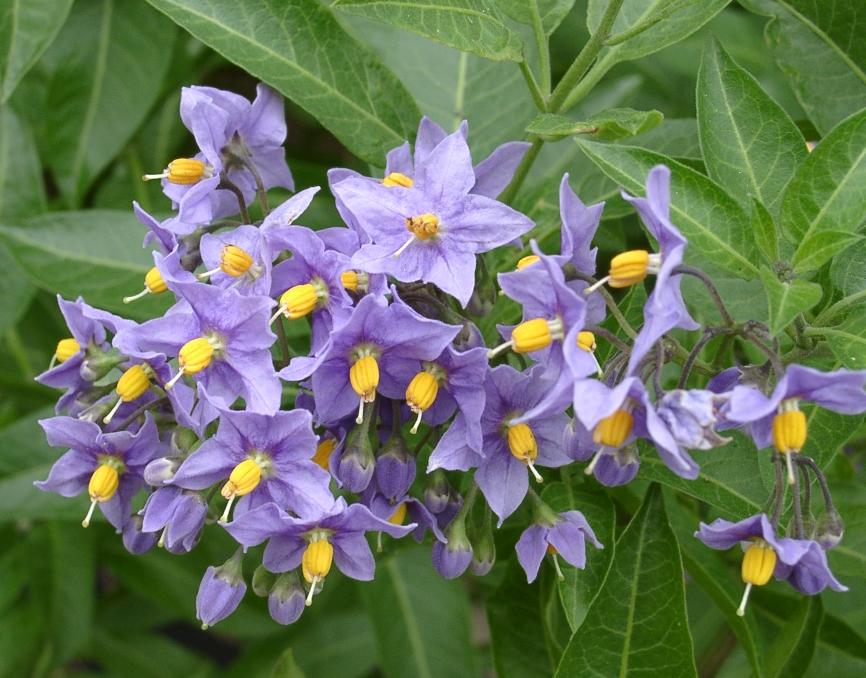
Solanum crispum

== New South Wales ==
On 25 August 1832, Anderson arrived in Sydney on the ship Brothers which had set out from Plymouth on 4 May. In 1835, he advertised seeds of 150 species of the "Flora of New South Wales" as well as 300 dried specimens for sale. In the same year he was appointed to the position of assistant superintendent at Sydney Botanic Gardens. He became superintendent in 1838 and continued in this role until his death in 1842.

== Death ==
Anderson died in 1842 in his residence at the botanic gardens. He was buried at Devonshire Street Cemetery, the inscription on his tombstone reading:

Erected to the memory of the late James Anderson, Superintendent of the Botanic Gardens, Sydney, who died on the 22nd April, 1842. He was born at Boquhan, near Stirling, Scotland, in 1797, and travelled over a great part of Europe, Africa, and America, and along the coast of New Holland, collecting rare botanic specimens. He was of a most kindly disposition, and highly esteemed by all who knew him. This monument was subscribed for by a number of his friends in this colony to show their respect for his memory.

In 1901 his remains were re-interred at the cemetery at La Perouse.

Carex andersonii, a species that he collected at Port Famine on the Strait of Magellan, was named in his honour.
