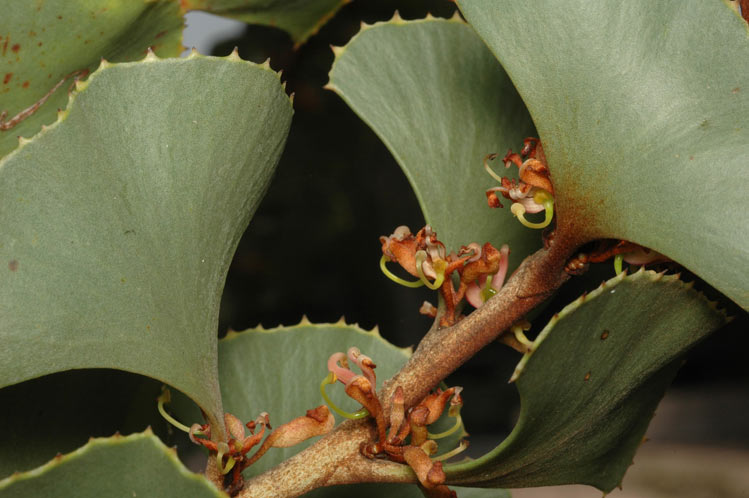
- Hakea brownii in the ANBG

Scientific classification
- Kingdom: Plantae
- Clade: Tracheophytes
- Clade: Angiosperms
- Clade: Eudicots
- Order: Proteales
- Family: Proteaceae
- Genus: Hakea
- Species: H. brownii

Binomial name
- Hakea brownii Meisn.
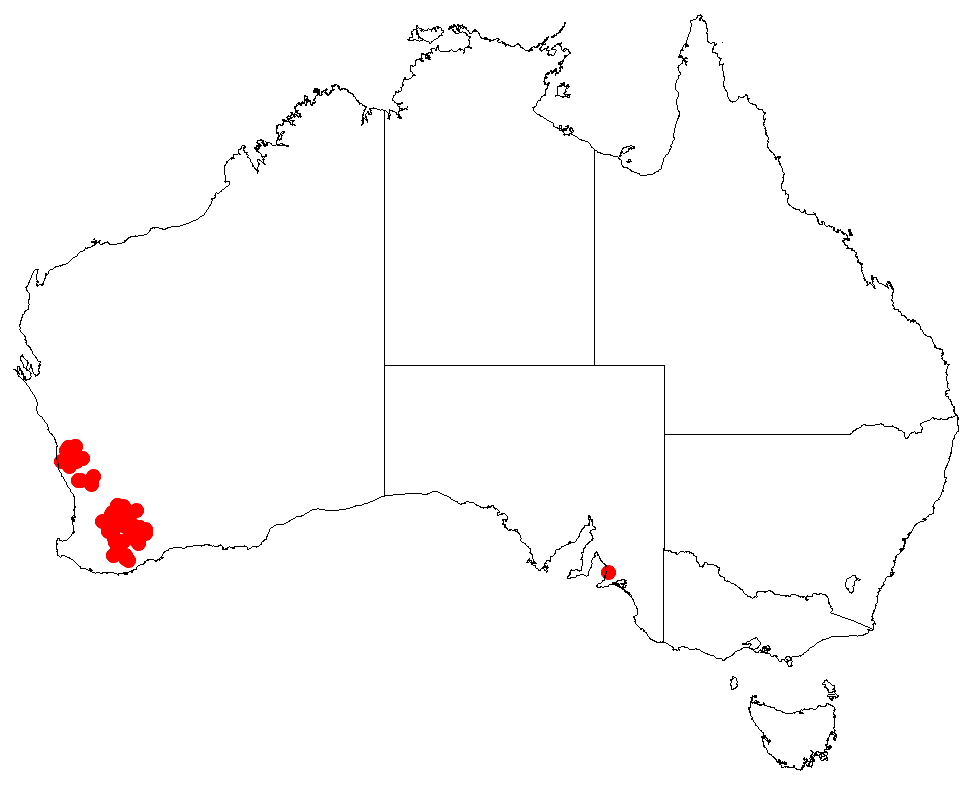
- Occurrence data from Australasian Virtual Herbarium

= Hakea brownii =

Fan-leaf hakea

Species of shrub native to Western Australia

Hakea brownii commonly known fan-leaf hakea is a shrub in the family Proteaceae native to an area in the Wheatbelt region of Western Australia. This species shares a common name with Hakea baxteri due to its distinctive leaves.

== Description ==
Hakea brownii is a lignotuberous shrub growing to 0.4 to 2.5 metres (1.3 to 8.2 ft) high. Smaller branches and new leaves are densely covered in matted rusty coloured silky hairs, becoming smooth by flowering. The leaves are ornamental, fan shaped, stiff, thickly textured and prickly toothed at the apex. They have straight sides tapering to the base, 2.8–6.5 cm (1–3 in) long and 2–6 mm (0.08–0.2 in) wide. The inflorescence consists of 6-10 small sweetly scented cream-brown flowers on an obscure stem. The pedicels are 2–6 mm (0.08–0.2 in) long thickly covered in matted silky rusty coloured hairs extending onto the lower part of the flower. The perianth is 5–7 mm (0.2–0.3 in) long and the style 7–9 mm (0.3–0.4 in) long. Flowers appear in clusters in the leaf axils or on old wood from August to November. The large rounded egg-shaped fruit are 3.5–5 cm (1–2 in) long and 4–4.5 cm (2–2 in) wide. The fruit surface is wrinkled and may have a network of veins tapering to a short beak.

== Taxonomy and naming ==
Hakea brownii was first described by Carl Meisner in 1845 and was published in Plantae Preissianae. The species was named after Robert Brown, librarian of the Linnean Society of London.

== Distribution and habitat ==
Hakea brownii is widespread from the coastal plains of the Murchison River through the central wheatbelt to Cape Riche. Grows on sandy loam, deep sand or sand over laterite in heath or shrubland. Requires a well-drained site with a sunny aspect. A frost-tolerant species, having uses in floral art and wildlife habitat.

== Conservation status ==
Hakea brownii is currently classified as "not threatened" by the Western Australian Government.
