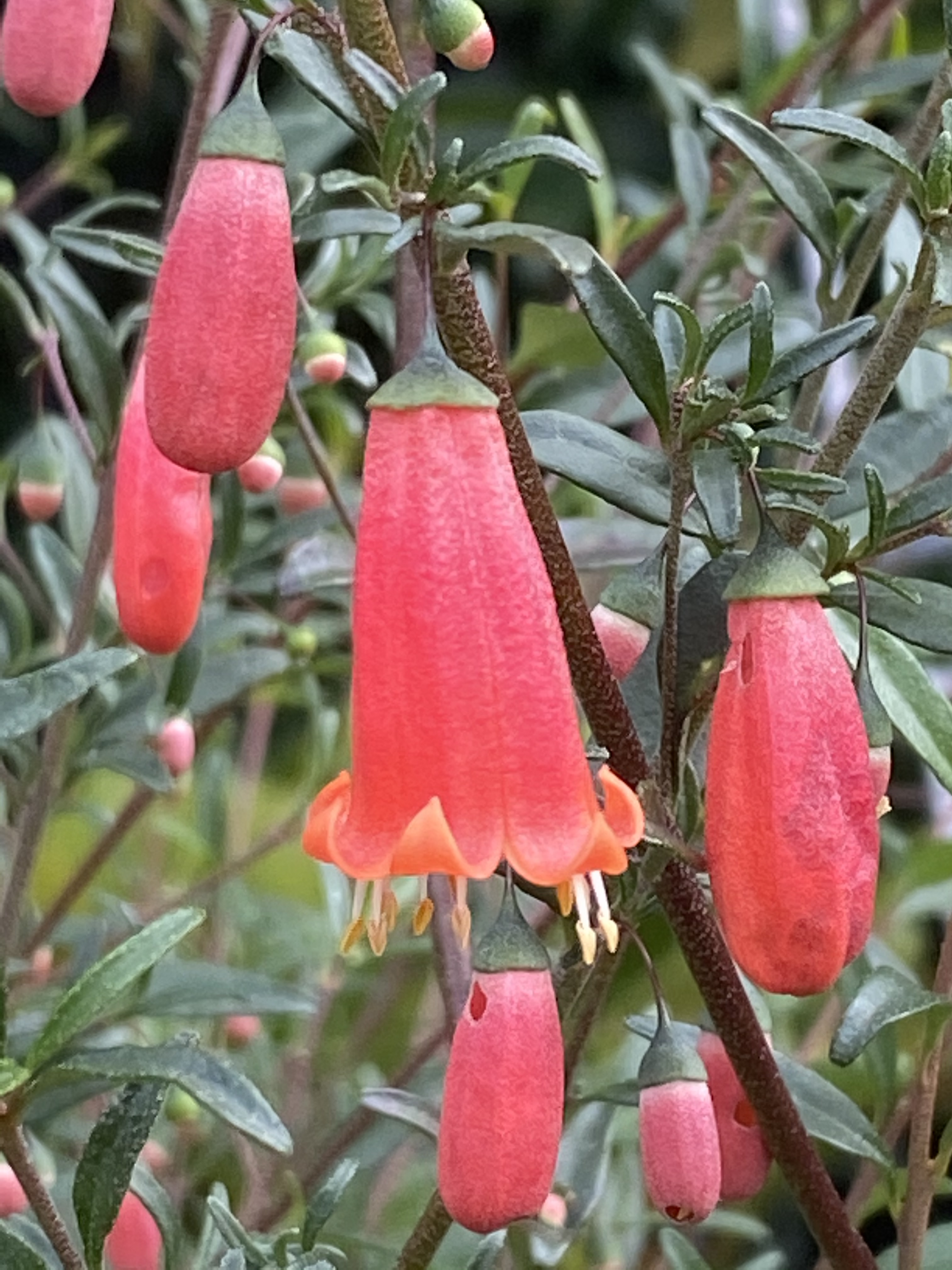

Scientific classification
- Kingdom: Plantae
- Clade: Tracheophytes
- Clade: Angiosperms
- Clade: Eudicots
- Clade: Rosids
- Order: Sapindales
- Family: Rutaceae
- Genus: Correa
- Species: C. pulchella

Binomial name
- Correa pulchella J.B.Mackay ex Sweet

Synonyms
- Corraea pulchella F.Muell. orth. var.; Correa minor J.M.Black nom. inval., nom. nud.; Correa neglecta Ashby; Correa neglecta var. minor Ashby nom. inval.; Correa pulchella Lindl. nom. illeg.; Correa reflexa var. pulchella (J.Mackay ex Sweet) Court; Correa × rubra var. pulchella (J.Mackay ex Sweet) J.M.Black

= Correa pulchella =

Salmon correa

Species of plant

Correa pulchella, commonly known as the salmon correa, is a species of small prostrate to erect shrub that is endemic to South Australia. It has glabrous, leathery, narrow oblong to broadly egg-shaped leaves and pendulous, cylindrical, pink to red or orange flowers arranged singly on short side branches.

== Description ==
Correa pulchella is a prostrate to erect shrub that typically grows to a height of 1 m (3 ft 3 in) and has smooth branchlets. The leaves are more or less glabrous, arranged in opposite pairs, narrow oblong to broadly egg-shaped or trowel-shaped, 10–20 mm (0.39–0.79 in) long and 3–15 mm (0.12–0.59 in) wide on a petiole 3–5 mm (0.12–0.20 in) long. The flowers are arranged singly on short side branches on a thin, pendulous pedicel 5–12 mm (0.20–0.47 in) long. The calyx is green, broadly hemispherical, 3–5 mm (0.12–0.20 in) long and the corolla is cylindrical or funnel-shaped, pink to red or orange, rarely white, 10–30 mm (0.39–1.18 in) long with the stamens about the same length as the corolla. Flowering mainly occurs from April to September.

== Taxonomy ==
Correa pulchella was first formally described in 1827 by Robert Sweet in his book Flora Australasica from an unpublished description by John Bain Mackay. The seeds had been collected on Kangaroo Island by William Baxter who had been sent to Australia by the plant collector Francis Henchman and grown by Mackay in his Clapton Nursery.

== Use in horticulture ==
Correa pulchella is regarded as one of the most attractive Correa species. It prefers dry summers with low humidity and well-drained alkaline soils. Propagation from seed is difficult, however semi-mature stem cuttings strike readily. It has gained the Royal Horticultural Society's Award of Garden Merit.

=== Cultivars ===
Cultivars include:

- 'Little Cate', a seedling selection of garden origin with prominently displayed bright pink flowers. It is thought to be a hybrid between two different forms.
- 'Pink Mist', a pale-pink flowering form selected from a wild population on the southern Yorke Peninsula.
- 'Dusky Bells', Correa pulchella × Correa reflexa
