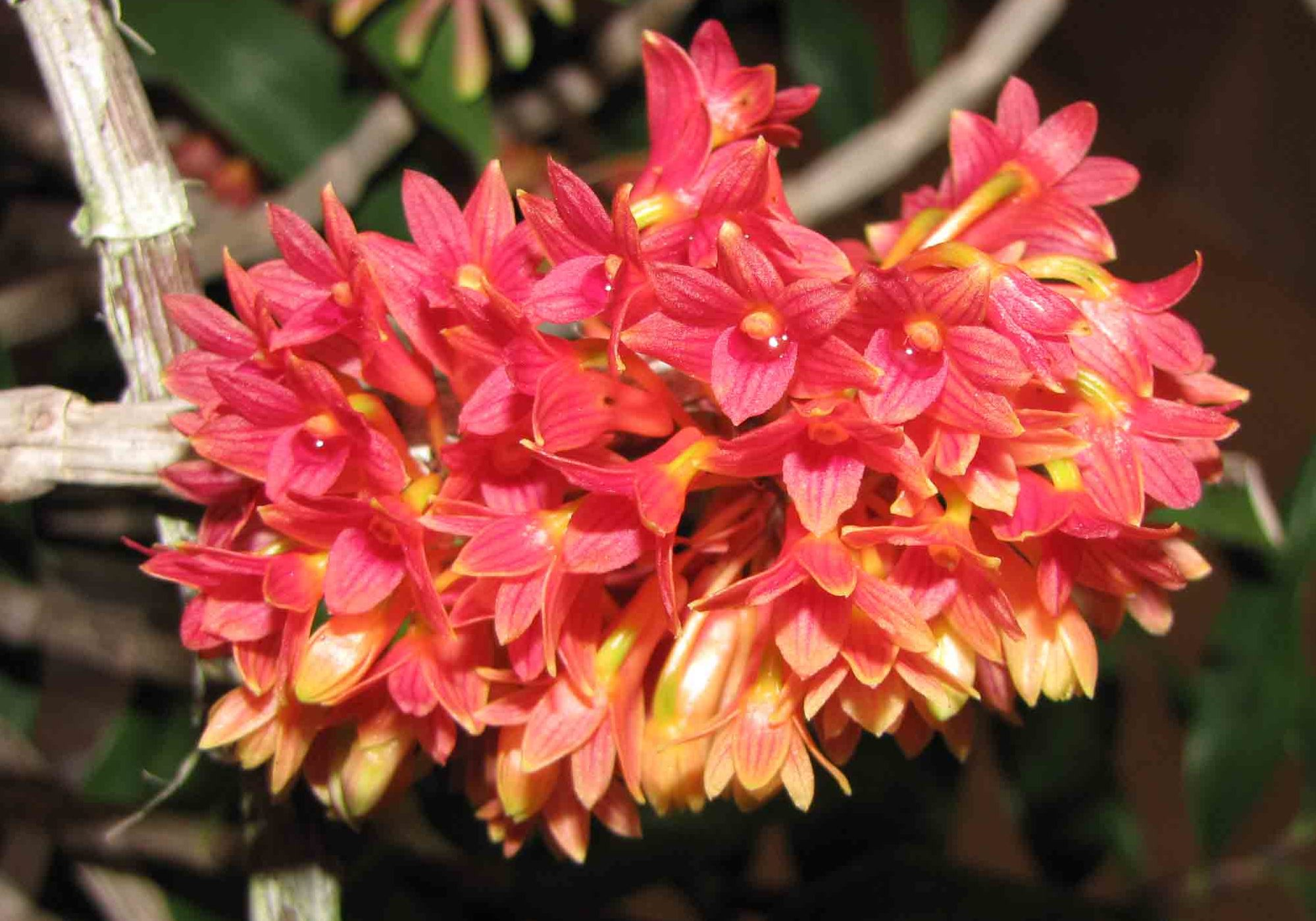
- Dendrobium × usitae flowering on leafless cane

Scientific classification
- Kingdom: Plantae
- Clade: Tracheophytes
- Clade: Angiosperms
- Clade: Monocots
- Order: Asparagales
- Family: Orchidaceae
- Subfamily: Epidendroideae
- Genus: Dendrobium
- Species: D. × usitae

Binomial name
- Dendrobium × usitae T.Yukawa

= Dendrobium × usitae =

Species of orchid

Dendrobium × usitae, or Usita's dendrobium, is a species of epiphytic orchid endemic to the Philippines. It is a natural hybrid between D. bullenianum and D. goldschmidtianum and can be easily distinguished from both species by its purplish orange flower. The specific epithet honors Villamor T. Usita of Quezon City, who discovered the species from Calayan, one of the five major islands of Babuyan archipelago. In its native habitat, the plant grows hanging on trees at an elevation of 500 to 700 meters above sea level alongside its parent species. The pendulous stem of D. × usitae can reach a length of 60 centimeters.
