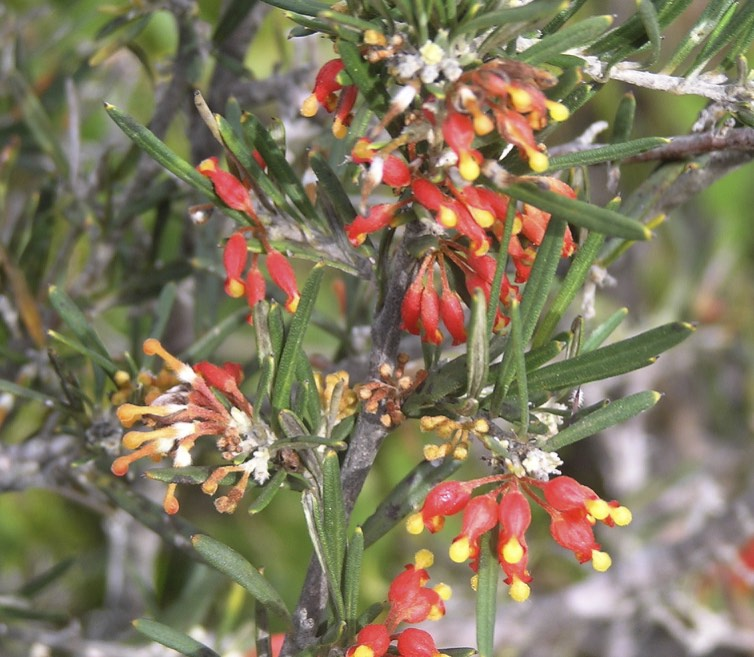
- In Hassell National Park

Conservation status
- Least Concern (IUCN 3.1)

Scientific classification
- Kingdom: Plantae
- Clade: Embryophytes
- Clade: Tracheophytes
- Clade: Spermatophytes
- Clade: Angiosperms
- Clade: Eudicots
- Order: Proteales
- Family: Proteaceae
- Genus: Grevillea
- Species: G. fasciculata

Binomial name
- Grevillea fasciculata R.Br.

Synonyms
- List: Grevillea aspera var. linearis Meisn.; Grevillea fasciculata var. divaricata R.Br.; Grevillea fasciculata var. dubia Domin p.p.; Grevillea fasciculata R.Br. var. fasciculata; Grevillea fasciculata var. linearis (Meisn.) Domin; Grevillea fasciculata var. stricta R.Br.; Grevillea fasciculata var. typica Domin nom. inval.; Grevillea meisneriana Meisn. nom. inval., pro syn.; Grevillea meisneriana F.Muell. ex Meisn.; Grevillea meissneriana J.Wrigley & Fagg orth. var.

= Grevillea fasciculata =

Species of shrub endemic to Western Australia

Grevillea fasciculata is a species of flowering plant in the family Proteaceae and is endemic to the south-west of Western Australia. It is a low, often spreading shrub with narrowly elliptic to more or less linear leaves and erect clusters of red and orange or orange and yellow flowers.

== Description ==
Grevillea fasciculata is an often spreading shrub that typically grows to a height of 0.3–1 m (1 ft 0 in – 3 ft 3 in). Its leaves are narrowly elliptic to lance-shaped with the narrower end towards the base, or more or less linear, 10–50 mm (0.39–1.97 in) long and 1–6 mm (0.039–0.236 in) wide. The edges of the leaves are turned down or rolled under, the upper surface of the leaves more or less smooth, the lower surface silky- or woolly-hairy or obscured. The flowers are arranged on short side branches, usually in erect in clusters of three to ten flowers on a rachis 0.2–2 mm (0.01–0.08 in) long. The flowers are red and orange or orange and yellow, the pistil 6.5–8.5 mm (0.26–0.33 in) long. Flowering occurs from May to November and the fruit is a narrowly oval follicle 10–14.5 mm (0.39–0.57 in) long.

== Taxonomy ==
Grevillea fasciculata was first formally described in 1830 by Robert Brown in the Supplementum primum prodromi florae Novae Hollandiae from specimens collected by William Baxter near King George Sound in 1829. The specific epithet (fasciculata) means "clustered", referring to the flowers.

== Distribution and habitat ==
This grevillea grows in woodland, mallee shrubland and scrub, mainly between Bremer Bay, Borden, Cranbrook and Albany in the Avon Wheatbelt, Esperance Plains and Jarrah Forest biogeographic regions of south-western Western Australia.

== Conservation status ==
Grevillea fasciculata is listed as least concern on the IUCN Red List of Threatened Species and as not threatened by the Government of Western Australia Department of Biodiversity, Conservation and Attractions. It has a relatively wide distribution, is locally common and does not appear to be facing any major threats, either currently or in the near future. Its population is stable and it occurs within multiple protected areas.
