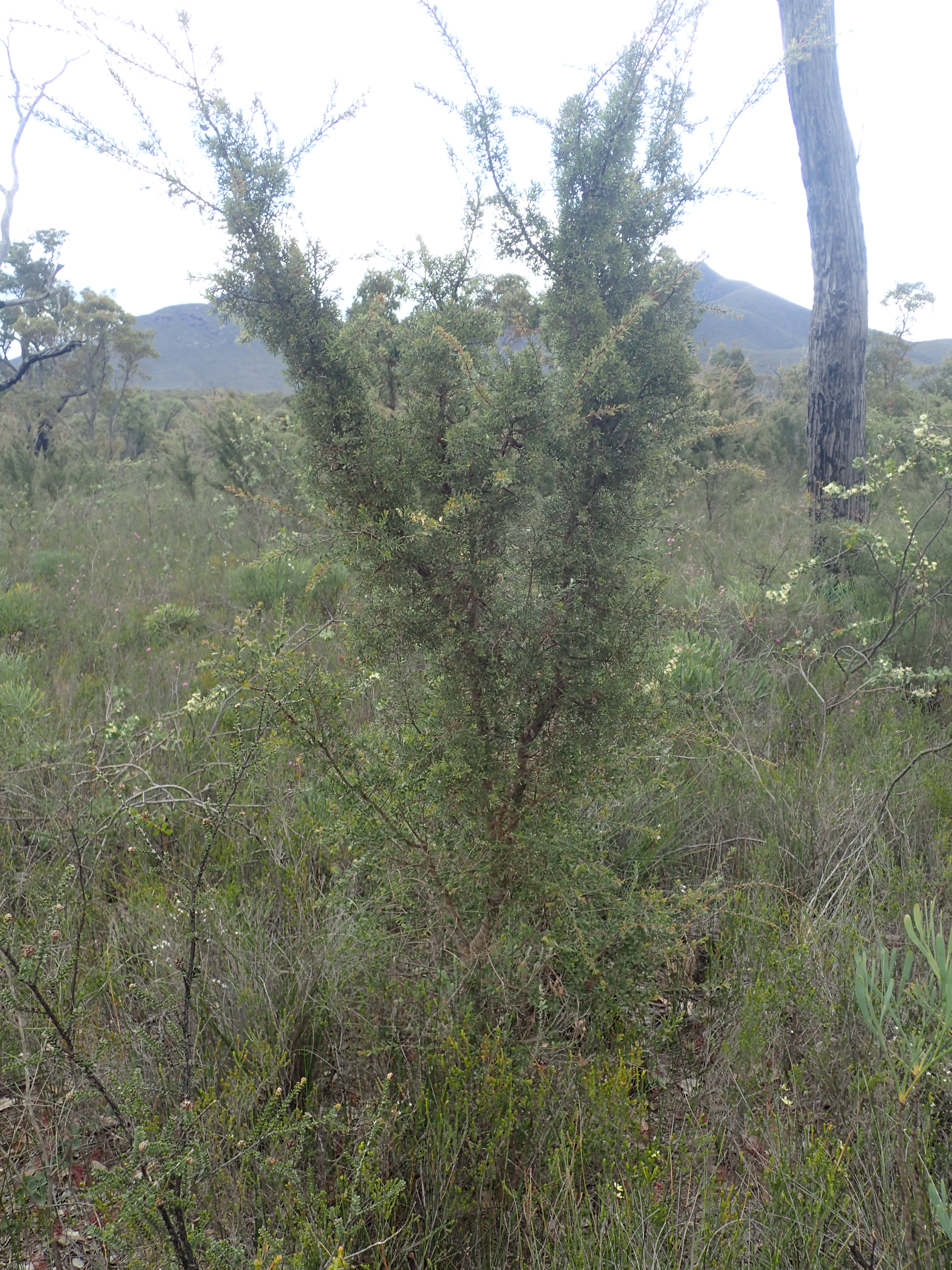
- Hakea tuberculata in the Stirling Range National Park

Scientific classification
- Kingdom: Plantae
- Clade: Tracheophytes
- Clade: Angiosperms
- Clade: Eudicots
- Order: Proteales
- Family: Proteaceae
- Genus: Hakea
- Species: H. tuberculata

Binomial name
- Hakea tuberculata R.Br.

= Hakea tuberculata =

Species of shrub endemic to Western Australia

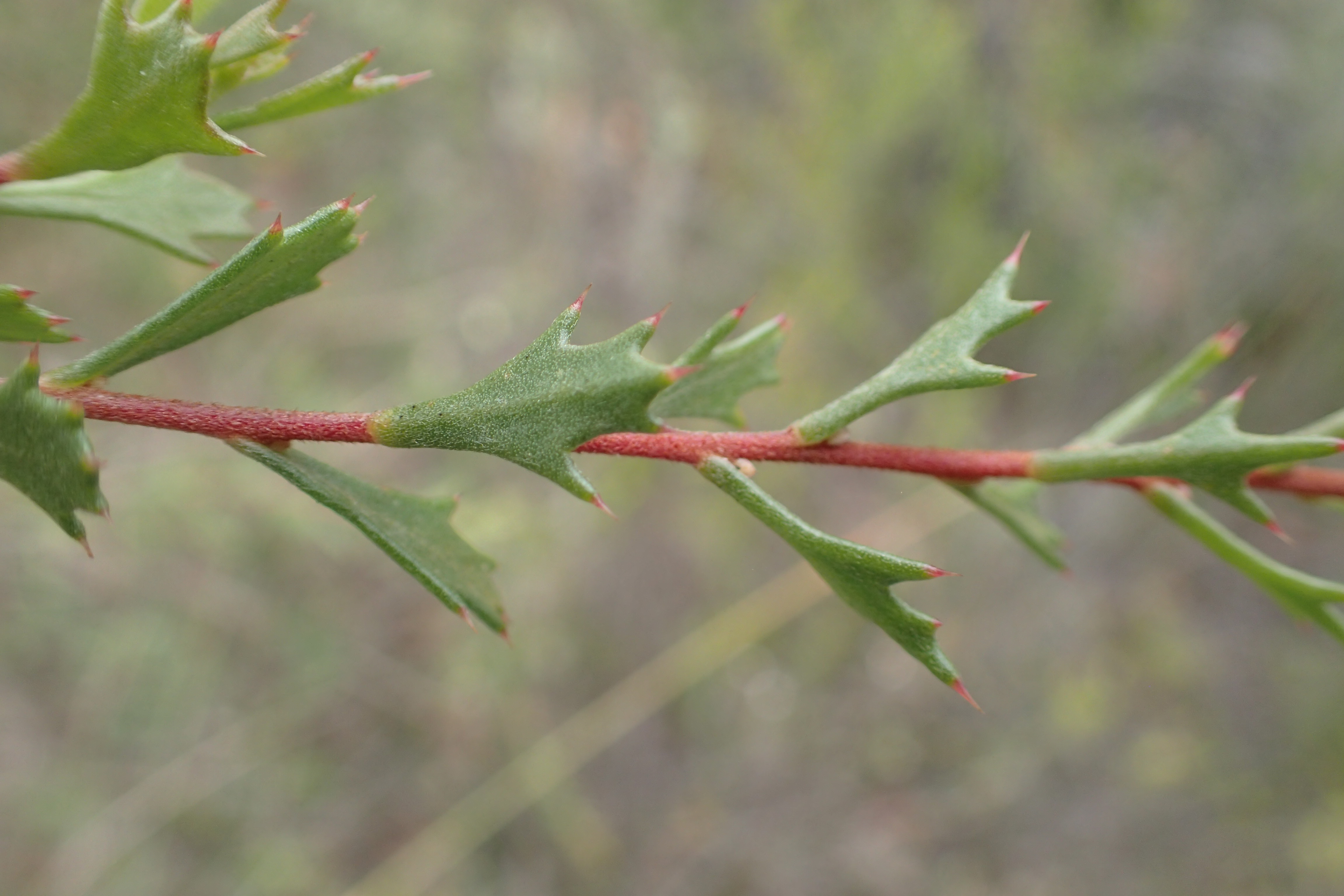
Leaves

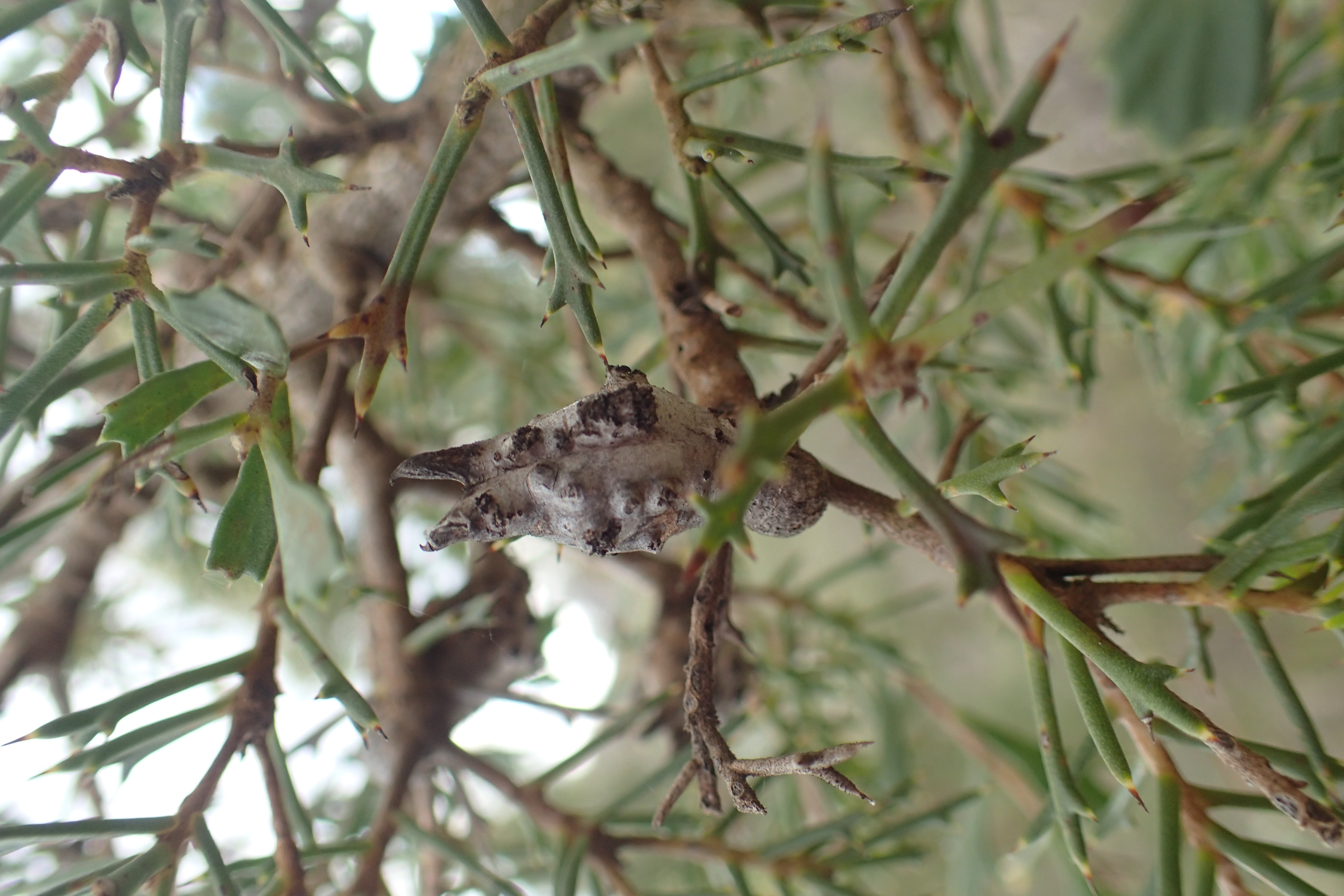
Fruit

Hakea tuberculata is a flowering plant in the family Proteaceae and is endemic to several isolated areas along the coast in the Peel, South West, Great Southern and Goldfields–Esperance regions of Western Australia. It is an upright shrub with white flowers and rigid, prickly leaves.

== Description ==
Hakea tuberculata is an upright, slender and columnar shrub typically growing to 2.5 metres (8 ft) high with ascending branches. The branchlets are thickly covered in coarse, stiff, rusty or white hairs. The stiff leaves are narrowly egg-shaped or elliptic, 1–2 cm (0.39–0.79 in) long and 2–6 mm (0.079–0.236 in) wide with 3-8 lobes or teeth toward the apex. The leaves are moderately or faintly covered in flattened, dense, silky, rusty coloured hairs quickly becoming smooth and ending in a very sharp point 1–2 mm (0.039–0.079 in) long. The inflorescence consists of 18-26 large, white, strongly scented flowers in leaf axils along a stem 2–4 mm (0.079–0.157 in) long. The overlapping bracts are covered with long, soft, white hairs. The pedicels are 3–5.5 mm (0.12–0.22 in) long, the pistil 5–5.5 mm (0.20–0.22 in) long and the white perianth 2.8–3.5 mm (0.11–0.14 in) long. The small ovoid fruit are 1.7–1.8 cm (0.67–0.71 in) wide and 0.8–0.9 cm (0.31–0.35 in) and have prominent coarse tubercles on the surface or are smooth, ending with two distinct horns at the apex about 3 mm (0.12 in) long. Flowering occurs mostly from March to April.

== Taxonomy and naming ==
Hakea tuberculata was first formally described in 1830 by Robert Brown and the description was published in Supplementum primum prodromi florae Novae Hollandiae. The specific epithet (tuberculum) means a "small swelling", referring to the tubercles on the surface of the fruit.

== Distribution and habitat ==
This hakea grows from the south coast at Augusta- Margaret River and Albany. It is found growing in low-lying areas along creek and drainage lines in sand, loam and lateritic gravel. Mostly found in wet winter locations near ironstone.

== Conservation status ==
Hakea tuberculata is classified as "not threatened" by the Western Australian Government Department of Parks and Wildlife.
