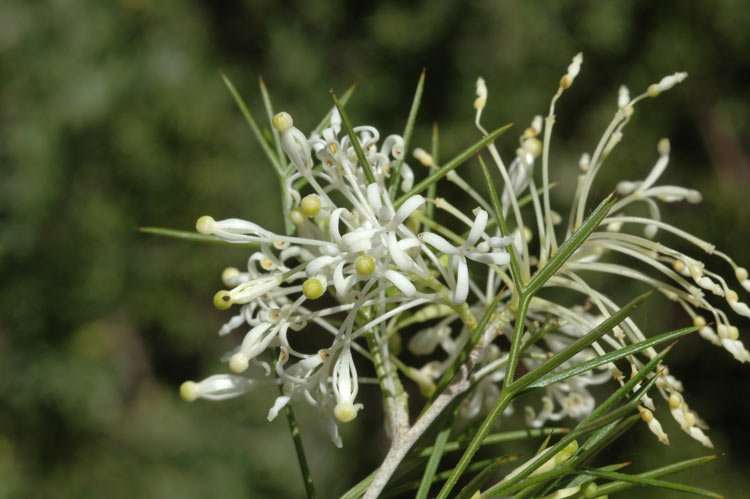
- Grevillea anethifolia in the Australian National Botanic Gardens

Conservation status
- Vulnerable (IUCN 3.1)

Scientific classification
- Kingdom: Plantae
- Clade: Embryophytes
- Clade: Tracheophytes
- Clade: Spermatophytes
- Clade: Angiosperms
- Clade: Eudicots
- Order: Proteales
- Family: Proteaceae
- Genus: Grevillea
- Species: G. anethifolia

Binomial name
- Grevillea anethifolia R.Br.

Synonyms
- Anadenia anethifolia Benth. nom. inval., pro syn.; Anadenia anethifolia J.Wrigley & Fagg nom. inval., pro syn.; Hakea anethifolia (R.Br.) Christenh. & Byng

= Grevillea anethifolia =

Spiny cream spider flower

Species of shrub endemic to Western Australia

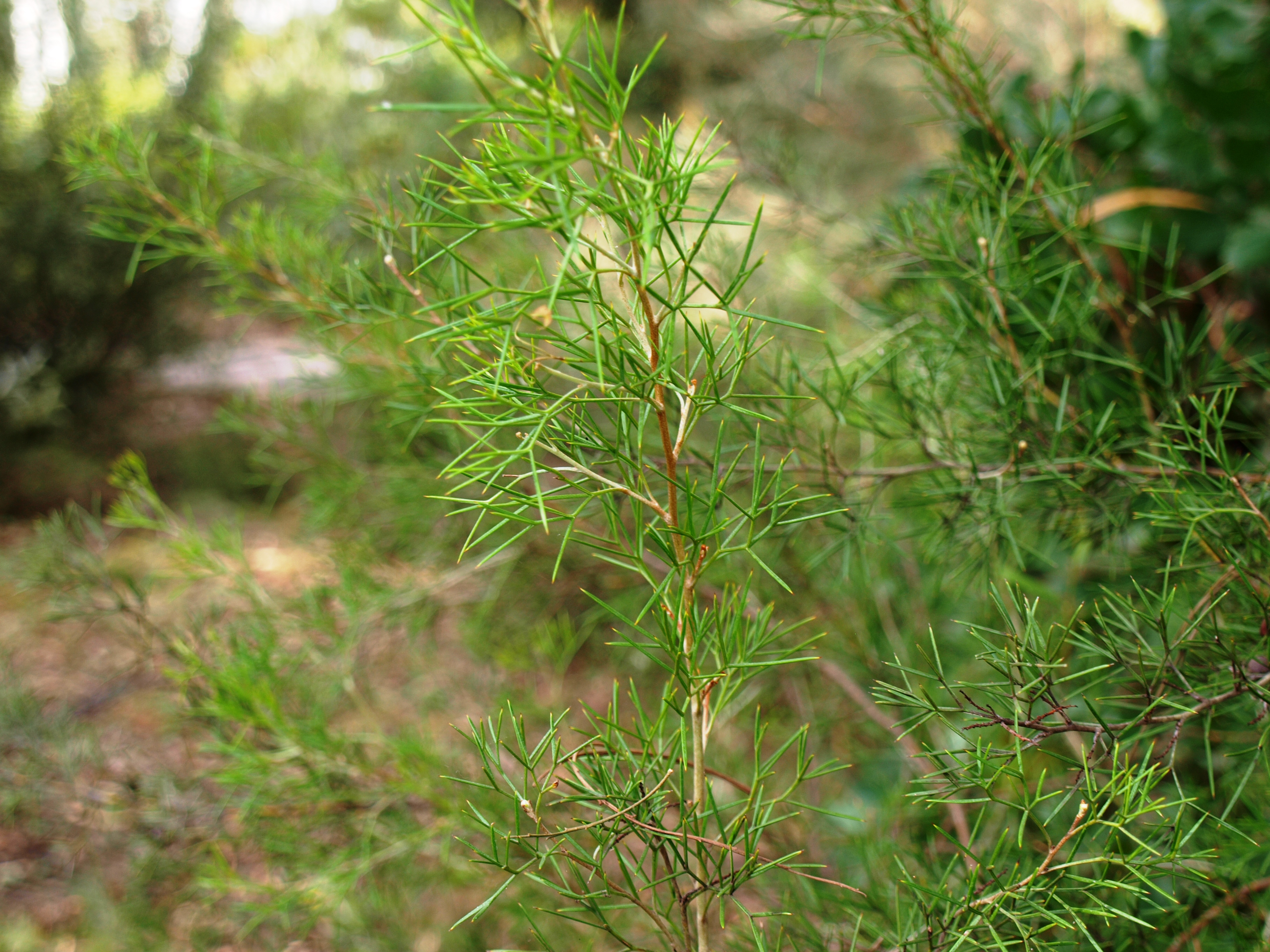
Foliage

Grevillea anethifolia, commonly known as spiny cream spider flower, is a species of flowering plant in the family Proteaceae and is endemic to continental Australia. It is an erect shrub with hairy branchlets, lobed leaves, the lobes sharply pointed, and white to pale yellow or cream-coloured flowers.

== Description ==
Grevillea anethifolia is an erect shrub that typically grows to a height of 0.5–2 m (1 ft 8 in – 6 ft 7 in) and sometimes forms rhizomes. The leaves are 15–50 mm (0.59–1.97 in) long and deeply divided with three to seven lobes, the lobes sometimes further divided. Each lobe is linear to more or less cylindrical, 5–45 mm (0.20–1.77 in) long and 0.4–1.2 mm (0.016–0.047 in) long with a sharply pointed tip. The flowers are arranged in loose, dome-shaped to more or less spherical groups 5–20 mm (0.20–0.79 in) long. The flowers are white to pale yellow or cream-coloured and glabrous, the pistil 4–6 mm (0.16–0.24 in) long with a white style. Flowering occurs from July to December and the fruit is an oblong follicle 7.5–9 mm (0.30–0.35 in) long.

== Taxonomy ==
Grevillea anethifolia was first formally described in 1830 by Robert Brown in his Supplementum primum prodromi florae Novae Hollandiae. The specific epithet (anethifolia) means "anise-leaved".

== Distribution and habitat ==
Spiny cream spider flower grows in heath, shrubland and mallee, sometimes near creeks and occurs between Southern Cross, Lake Grace, Zanthus and Cape Arid in south-western Western Australia, on the Eyre Peninsula in South Australia and around Griffith in New South Wales.

== Conservation status ==
Grevillea anethifolia is listed as vulnerable by the International Union for Conservation of Nature. The species is predominantly restricted to roadside verges due to land clearing for agriculture. These roadside verges are often subject to clearance and weed invasion. In New South Wales, habitat destruction due to mining is considered a major threat to the species.
