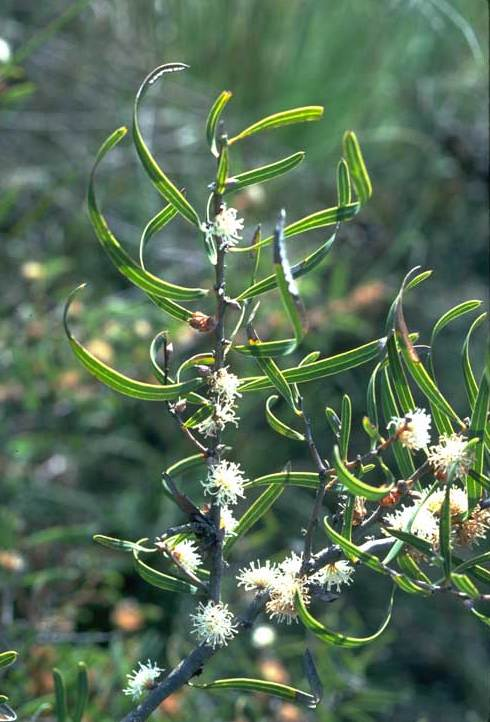
- Hakea stenocarpa in the ANBG

Scientific classification
- Kingdom: Plantae
- Clade: Tracheophytes
- Clade: Angiosperms
- Clade: Eudicots
- Order: Proteales
- Family: Proteaceae
- Genus: Hakea
- Species: H. stenocarpa

Binomial name
- Hakea stenocarpa R.Br.
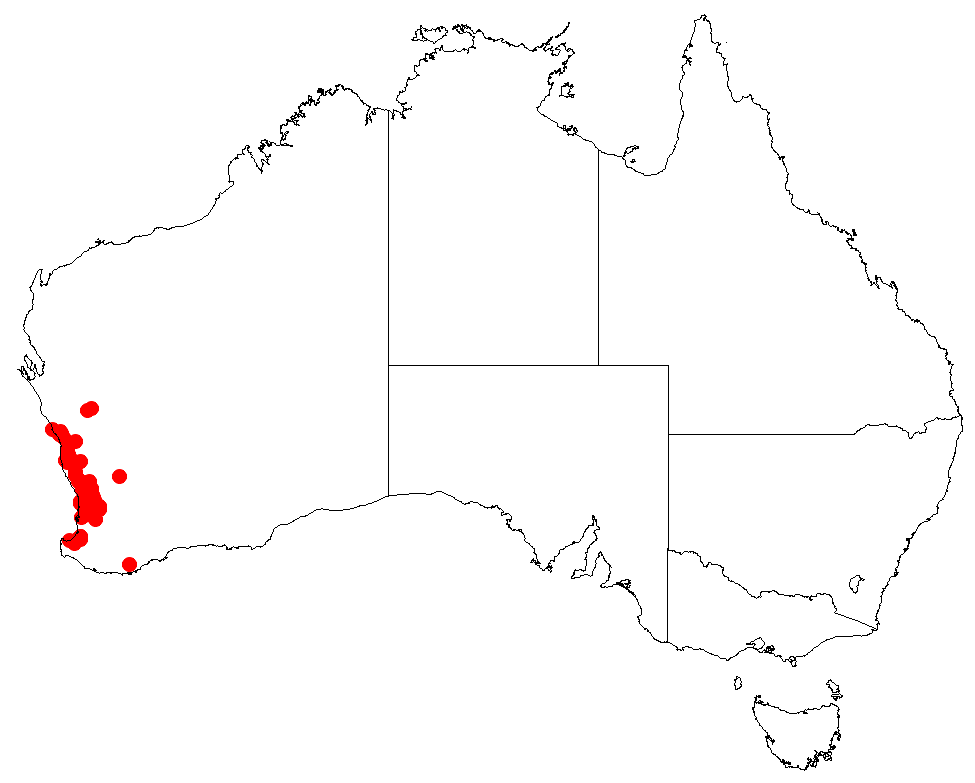
- Occurrence data from Australasian Virtual Herbarium

= Hakea stenocarpa =

Narrow-fruited hakea

Species of shrub endemic to Australia

Hakea stenocarpa is a shrub in the family Proteaceae, commonly known as narrow-fruited hakea. It has scented creamy-white flowers in clusters, often with curling leaves and is endemic to an area in the Mid West, western Wheatbelt, Peel and the South West regions of Western Australia.

== Description ==
Hakea stenocarpa is a small, rounded multi-stemmed shrub that typically grows to 0.3 to 1 metre (1 to 3 ft) high and forms a lignotuber. The branchlets are more or less smooth at flowering time. The inflorescence is a single raceme of 14-20 sweetly scented white, creamy-white or yellow flowers in leaf axils in the upper branchlets. The smooth pedicels are cream-white, the perianth cream-white and the pistil 4.4–5 mm (0.17–0.20 in) long. The linear leaves are 6–11 cm (2–4 in) long and 2–7 mm (0.08–0.3 in) wide with a prominent pale yellow longitudinal mid-vein. The leaves generally curl in an upward spiral. Unlike most species of hakea, the fruit are long, narrow-ovoid, 2.8–3 cm (1.1–1.2 in) long and 0.6–0.8 cm (0.24–0.31 in) wide, tapering to a pointed beak. The fruit are rough and warty where they attach to the branches.

== Taxonomy and naming ==
Hakea stenocarpa was first formally described by Robert Brown in 1830 and published the description in Supplementum primum prodromi florae Novae Hollandiae. The specific epithet is derived from the ancient Greek stenos (στενός), "narrow" and karpos (καρπός), "fruit", referring to the shape of the fruit.

== Distribution and habitat ==
Narrow-fruited hakea grows in heath, low open shrubland and woodland in deep sand, loam, clay and gravel sometimes over laterite. Requires a well-drained site in sun or partial shade. An ornamental shrub, may be used as a groundcover.

== Conservation status ==
Hakea stenocarpa is classified as "not threatened" by the Western Australian Government Department of Parks and Wildlife.
