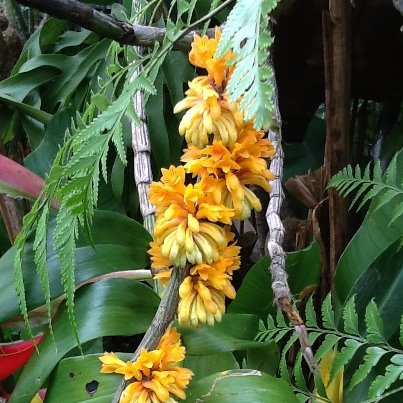

Scientific classification
- Kingdom: Plantae
- Clade: Tracheophytes
- Clade: Angiosperms
- Clade: Monocots
- Order: Asparagales
- Family: Orchidaceae
- Subfamily: Epidendroideae
- Genus: Dendrobium
- Species: D. bullenianum

Binomial name
- Dendrobium bullenianum Rchb.f.

Synonyms
- D. chrysocephalum Kraenzl.; D. erythroxanthum Rchb.f.; D. topaziacum Ames

= Dendrobium bullenianum =

Species of orchid

Dendrobium bullenianum is a member of the family Orchidaceae found in the Philippines and Vietnam. It is named in honor of Mr. Bullen, orchid cultivator with Low & Co.'s nursery, who was first in Britain get this species to flower in cultivation. It is pendulous and sympodial with 1 meter long pseudobulbs of 1.5 cm thickness and deciduous leaves of 10 cm by 1.5 cm. Heinrich Gustav Reichenbach was the first to describe this species in 1862 in Botanische Zeitung. It is found as an epiphyte in elevations up to 1,000 metres in Luzon and Mindoro in the Philippines.
