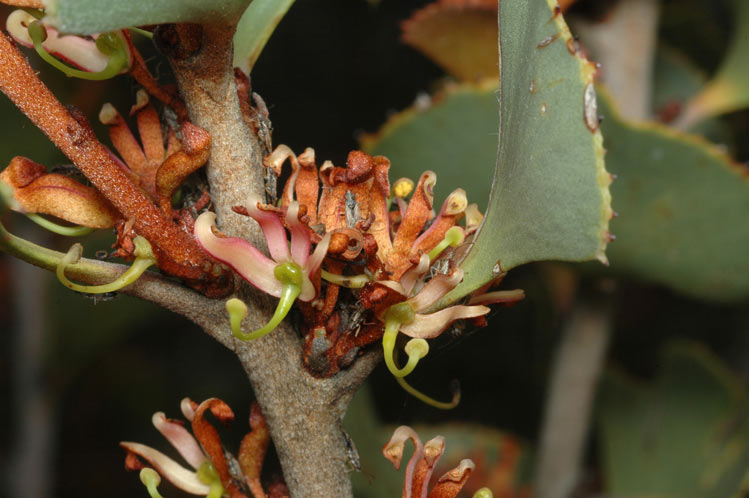
- Hakea baxteri in the ANBG

Scientific classification
- Kingdom: Plantae
- Clade: Tracheophytes
- Clade: Angiosperms
- Clade: Eudicots
- Order: Proteales
- Family: Proteaceae
- Genus: Hakea
- Species: H. baxteri

Binomial name
- Hakea baxteri R.Br.
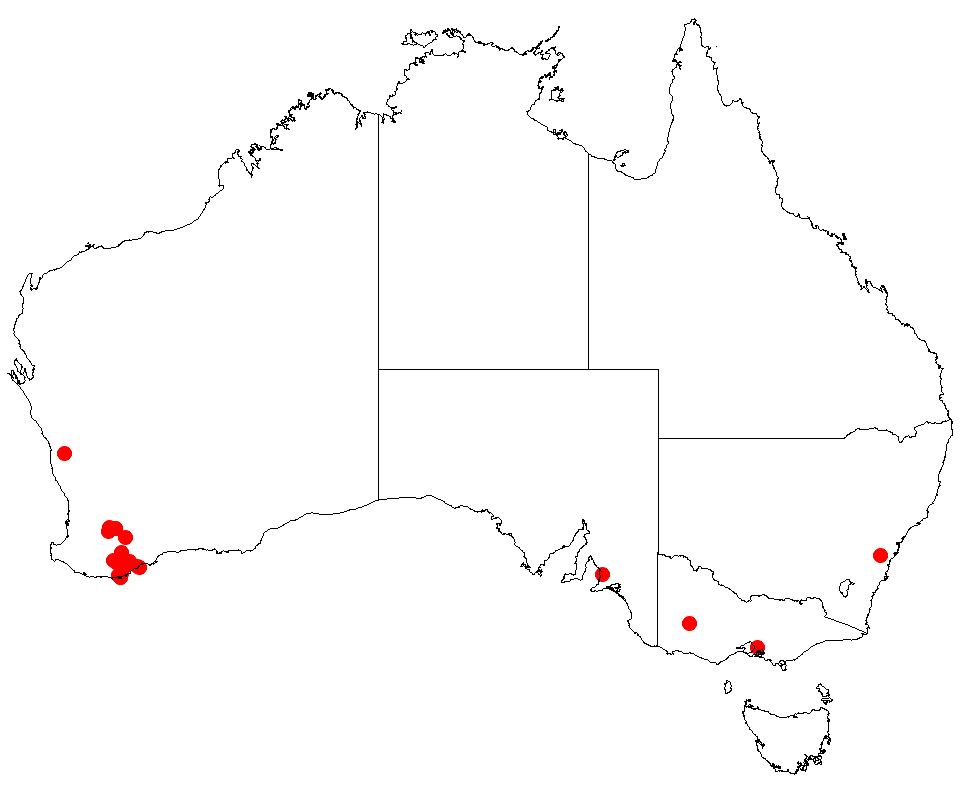
- Occurrence data from Australasian Virtual Herbarium

= Hakea baxteri =

Fan-leaf hakea

Species of shrub native to Western Australia

Hakea baxteri, commonly known as fan-leaf hakea, is a shrub in the family Proteaceae native to an area in the Great Southern and Wheatbelt regions of Western Australia. It is a species noted for its foliage due to its fan-shaped leaves.

== Description ==
Hakea baxteri is a non lignotuberous tall upright shrub 1–5 m (3–20 ft) with smooth grey bark. Smaller branches and young leaves have densely matted soft rusty coloured hairs becoming smooth when flowering. The dark green rigid leaves are 4–8 cm (2–3 in) long and 3–9 cm (1–4 in) wide, fan shaped with a toothed upper margin narrowing at the base. The inflorescence consists of 4–8 small strongly scented flowers, light red with a green style. They form in clusters on an obscure stem in the leaf axils or on old wood. The pedicel is 3–4 mm (0.1–0.2 in) long and densely covered with rusty-brown raised hairs continuing onto the 7–9 mm (0.3–0.4 in) long perianth. The large fruit have a roughish surface are globular shaped with a small hooked beak. Hakeas are characterised by their woody fruits, each seed pod containing two winged seeds.

== Taxonomy and naming ==
Hakea baxteri was first formally described in 1830 by botanist Robert Brown and the description was published in Supplementum primum prodromi florae Novae Hollandiae. Hakea baxteri was named after William Baxter, a 19th-century English botanical collector.

== Distribution and habitat ==
Hakea baxteri grows in the Stirling Range National Park and nearby locations in heathlands and mallee on sandy-loam and gravel.

== Conservation status ==
Hakea baxteri is listed as "not threatened" by Western Australian Government.

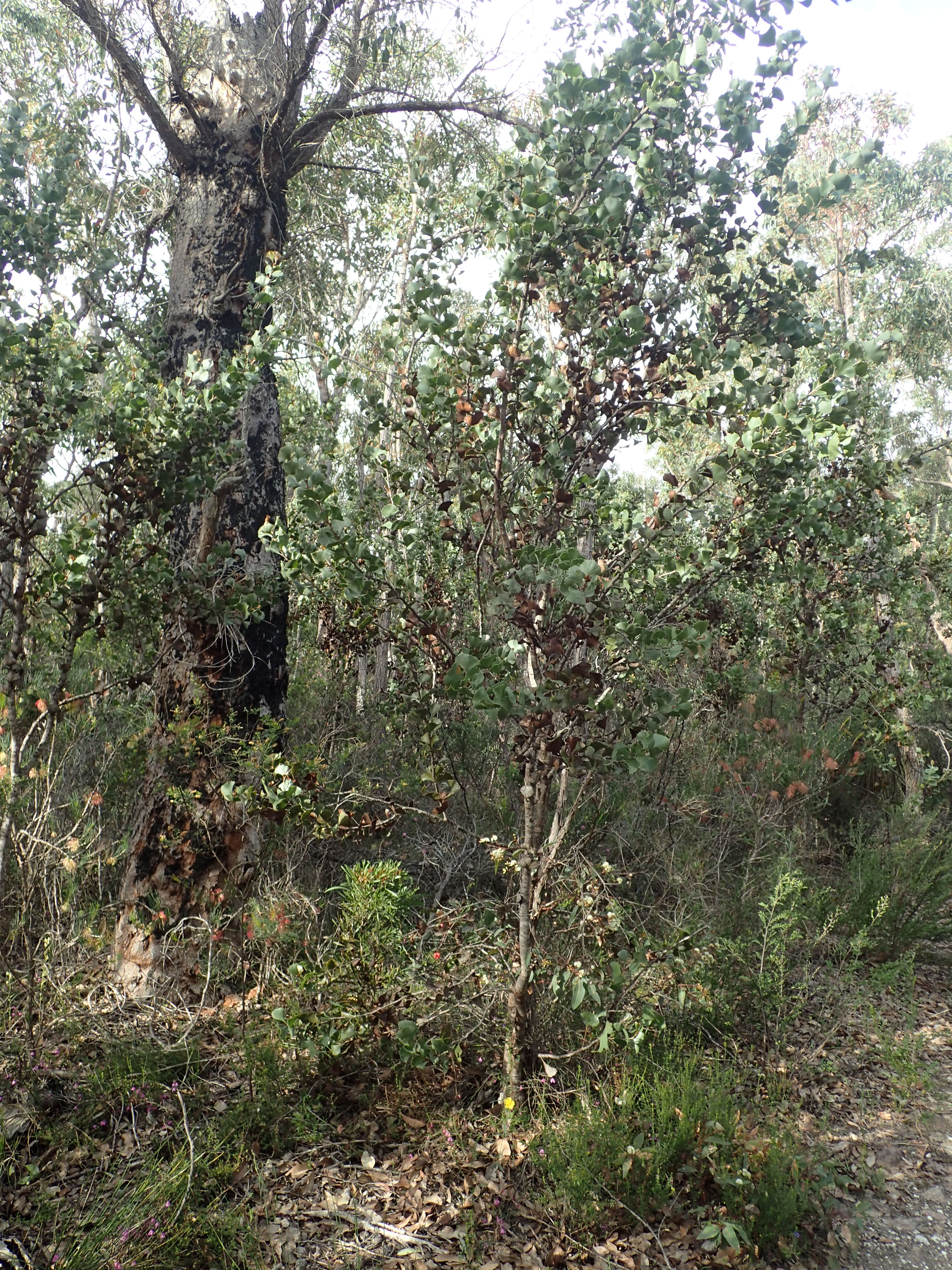
Habit near Mount Magog in the Stirling Range National Park

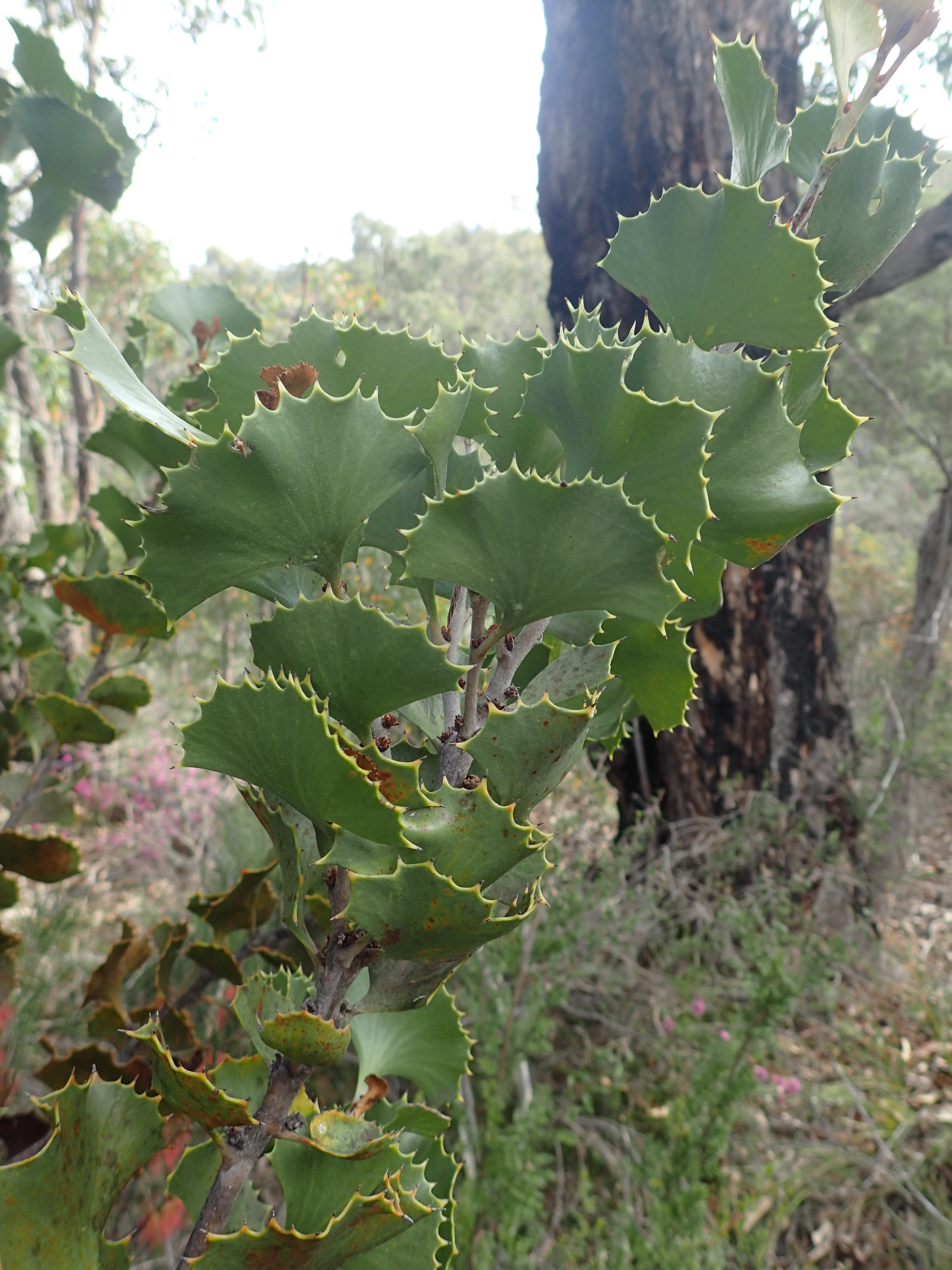
Leaves

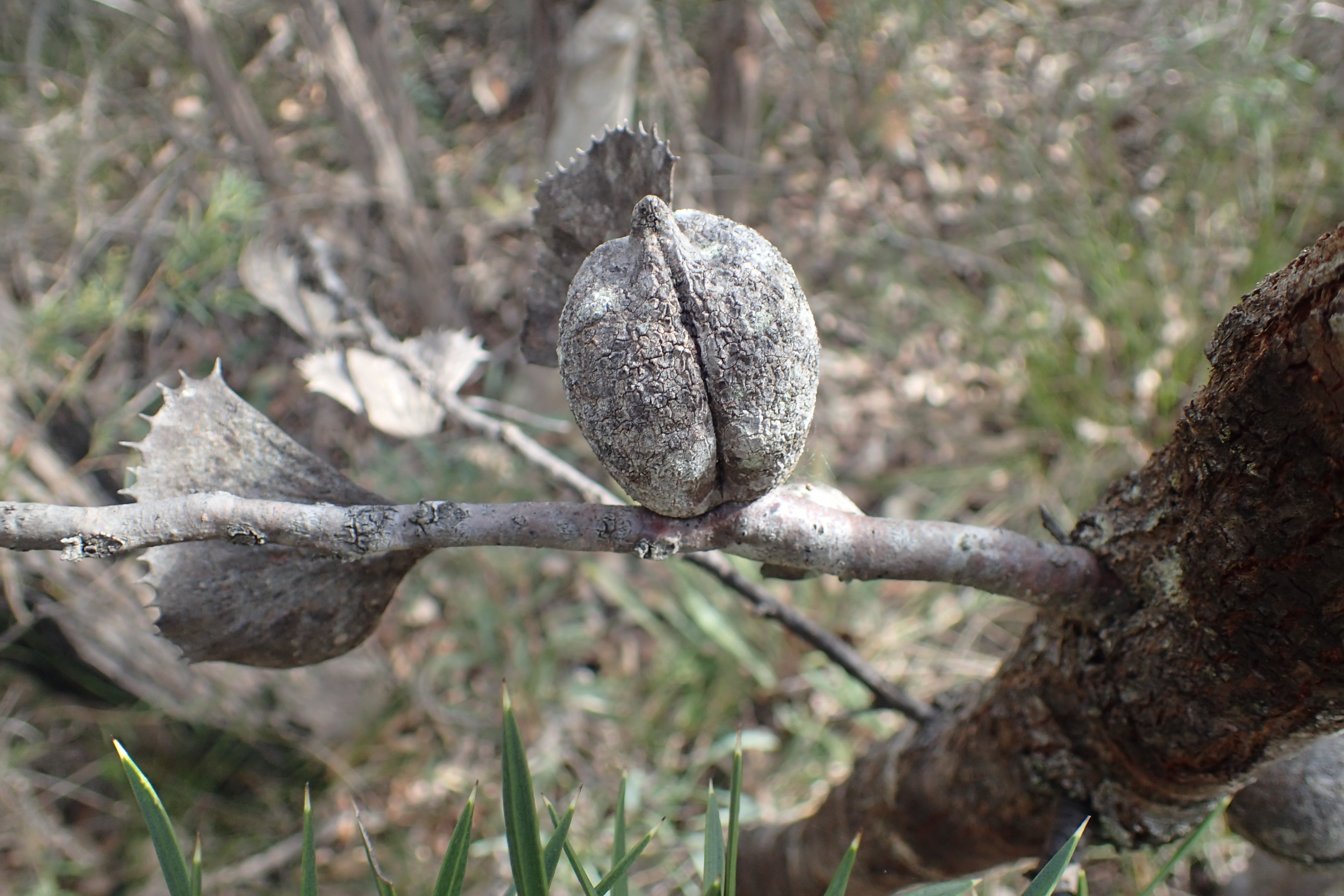
Fruit
