= John Bain Mackay =

British horticulturist (1795–1888)

John Bain Mackay (5 February 1795 – 9 August 1888) was a nurseryman based in Clapton, London noted for his introductions of Australian and South American plants into cultivation.

He was born in Echt in Aberdeenshire in Scotland. At his Clapton Nursery, he propagated plant material sent to him by William Baxter from Australia and James Anderson from South America. In addition to his nursery, he had a showroom in King's Road, Chelsea. His foreman, Hugh Low, took over the nursery in 1831.

Mackay became a Fellow of the Linnaean Society. He died in Totteridge, Hertfordshire on 9 August 1888 at the age of 93.
