= Correa 'Dusky Bells' =

Shrub cultivar

- Genus: Correa
- Hybrid parentage: Correa pulchella × Correa reflexa
- Cultivar: 'Dusky Bells'

Correa 'Dusky Bells' is a Correa cultivar from Australia. It is a compact and dense shrub that grows to 0.6 metres in height and 2 to 4 metres in width. The lanceolate, elliptic or ovate leaves vary in size from 10 to 40 mm long and 5 to 20 mm wide. The tubular flowers are pale carmine pink and appear predominantly between March and September.

The cultivar is believed to have been originally distributed as Correa sp. and later as Correa sp. (pink), Correa 'Rubra', Correa 'Carmine Bells' and Correa 'Pink Bells'. The name 'Dusky Bells' was originally applied to a Correa reflexa cultivar, but came to be adopted for the plant now known by that name. An application to register the name 'Dusky Bells' was received by the Australian Cultivar Registration Authority in 1980 and accepted in 1986.

== Cultivation ==
It is a long-lived shrub, with frost resistance and moderate drought tolerance. Being a hybrid, propagation by cuttings is required to produce plants which are true to type. Correa 'Dusky Bells' has gained the Royal Horticultural Society's Award of Garden Merit.
