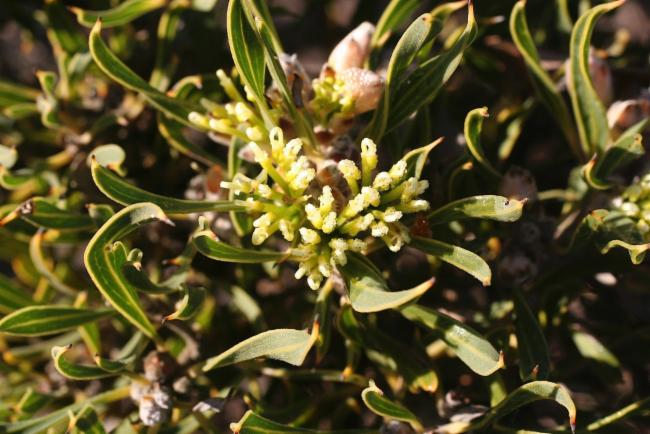

Scientific classification
- Kingdom: Plantae
- Clade: Tracheophytes
- Clade: Angiosperms
- Clade: Eudicots
- Order: Proteales
- Family: Proteaceae
- Genus: Hakea
- Species: H. eneabba

Binomial name
- Hakea eneabba Haegi
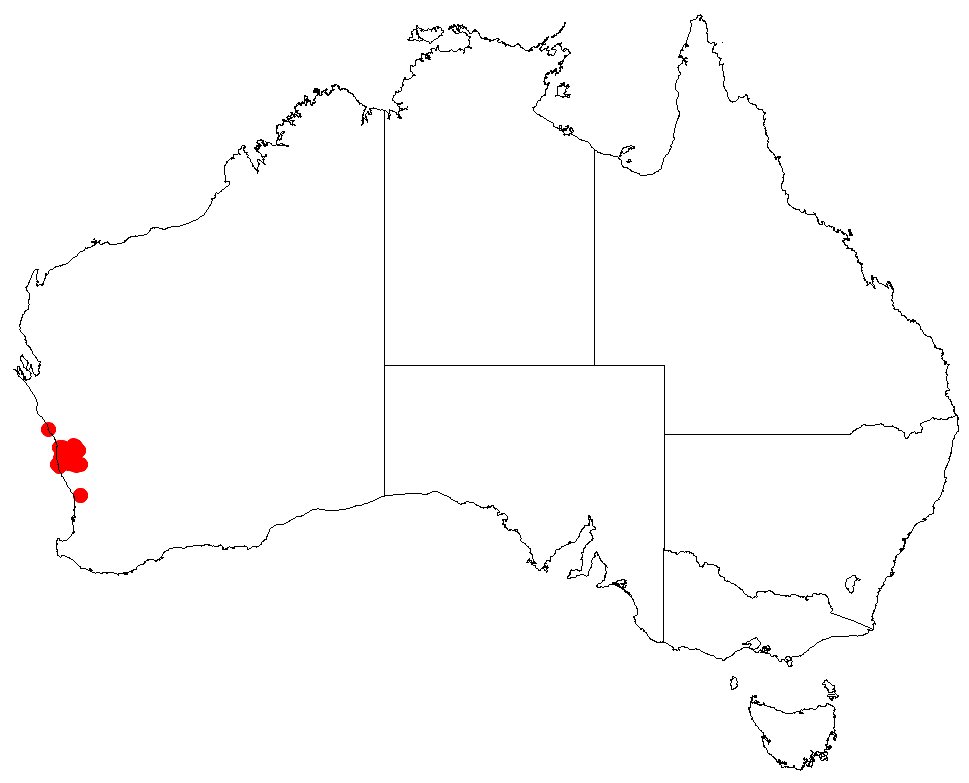
- Occurrence data from AVH

= Hakea eneabba =

Species of shrub endemic to Western Australia

Hakea eneabba is a shrub in the family Proteaceae. It is endemic to an area along the west coast in the Mid West region of Western Australia.

== Description ==
Hakea eneabba is a low, many-branched lignotuberous shrub growing to a height of 0.4 to 1.5 metres (1.3 to 4.9 ft). Smaller branches are either smooth or hairy. Leaves are smooth and rigid with a central vein the length of the leaf ending with a sharp point at the apex. The leaves grow alternately or are whorled around the stem 30–120 mm (1.2–4.7 in) long and 4–14 mm (0.16–0.55 in) wide, widest above the middle. The inflorescence consists of 14–18 chrome-yellow flowers appearing in leaf axils in upper branches. The pedicel is smooth 2–3 mm (0.079–0.12 in) long. The perianth pale yellowish to green and 24–27 mm (0.94–1.1 in) long. The style is smooth and 28–31 mm (1.1–1.2 in) long. The fruit form in the leaf axils at an angle to the stem are egg-shaped 2.2–2.4 cm (0.87–0.94 in) long and 1.1–1.4 cm (0.43–0.55 in) wide tapering to a rounded beak .

== Taxonomy and naming ==
This species of Hakea was named after the vicinity of Eneabba where it grows. It was first formally described by the botanist Laurence Haegi in 1999 in the work Flora of Australia by Haegi, William Robert Barker, Robyn Barker and Annette Wilson.

== Distribution and habitat ==
It grows in scattered areas in and around Eneabba between Geraldton in the north to Dandaragan in the south on deep sand in heathland. This ornamental species requires a well-drained site in full sun.
