= LNWR 18in Goods Class =

LNWR 18-inch Goods (“Cauliflower”)
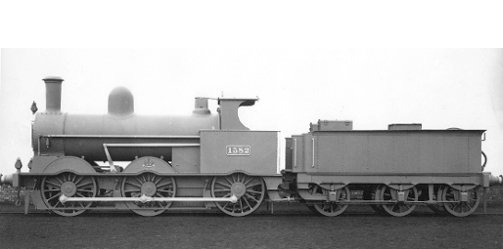
- A photo of 1382 in photographic grey livery, as built.
Type and origin
- Power type: Steam
- Designer: Francis Webb
- Builder: Crewe Works
- Serial number: 2379, 2576–2584, 2926–2935, 3002–3011, 3272–3281, 3536–3545, 3561–3570, 3576–3595, 3616–3655, 3706–3715, 3786–3805, 3908–3927, 3956–3965, 3985–3994, 4005–4024, 4035–4044, 4065–4124, 4145–4154, 4165–4174, 4215–4224
- Build date: June 1880 – May 1902
- Total produced: 310
Specifications
- Configuration
  - Whyte: 0-6-0
  - UIC: C n2
- Gauge: 4 ft 8 1/2 in (1,435 mm)
- Driver dia.: 5 ft 2 1/2 in (1.588 m)
- Wheelbase
  - Axle spacing (Asymmetrical): 7 ft 3 in (2.21 m) + 8 ft 3 in (2.51 m)
  - Drivers: 15 ft 6 in (4.72 m)
- Length: 46 ft 0 in (14.02 m)
- Loco weight: 35 long tons (36 t)
- Fuel type: Coal
- Boiler pressure: 150 lbf/in^{2} (1,030 kPa; 10.5 kgf/cm^{2})
- Cylinders: Two, inside
- Cylinder size: 18 in × 24 in (457 mm × 610 mm)
- Valve gear: Joy
Performance figures
- Tractive effort: 15,865 lbf (70.57 kN)
Career
- Operators: London and North Western Railway; London, Midland and Scottish Railway; British Railways
- Power class: 2F
- Nicknames: Cauliflowers
- Withdrawn: 1922–1955
- Disposition: All scrapped

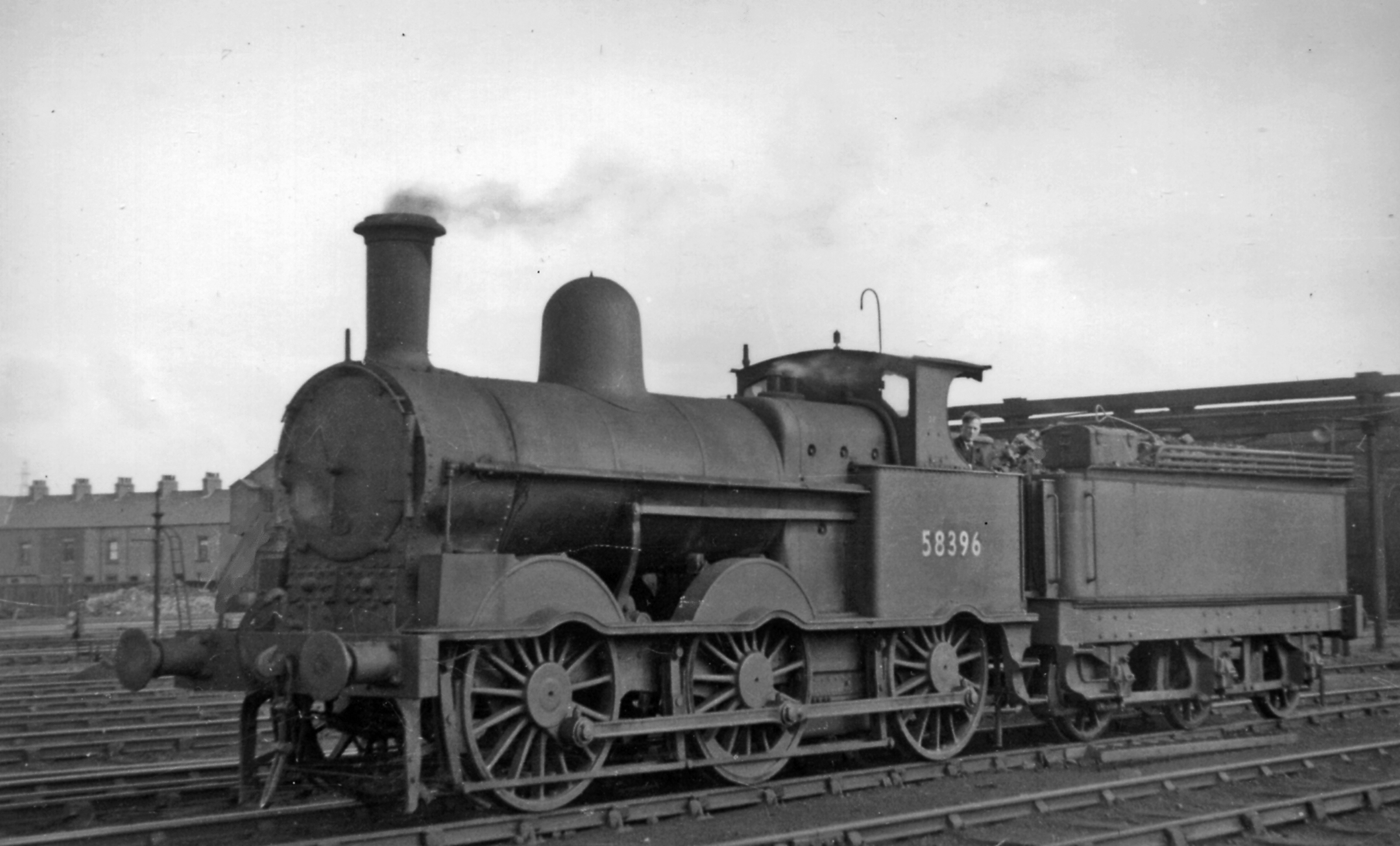
No. 58396 (former LMS No. 28512) at Workington Locomotive Depot

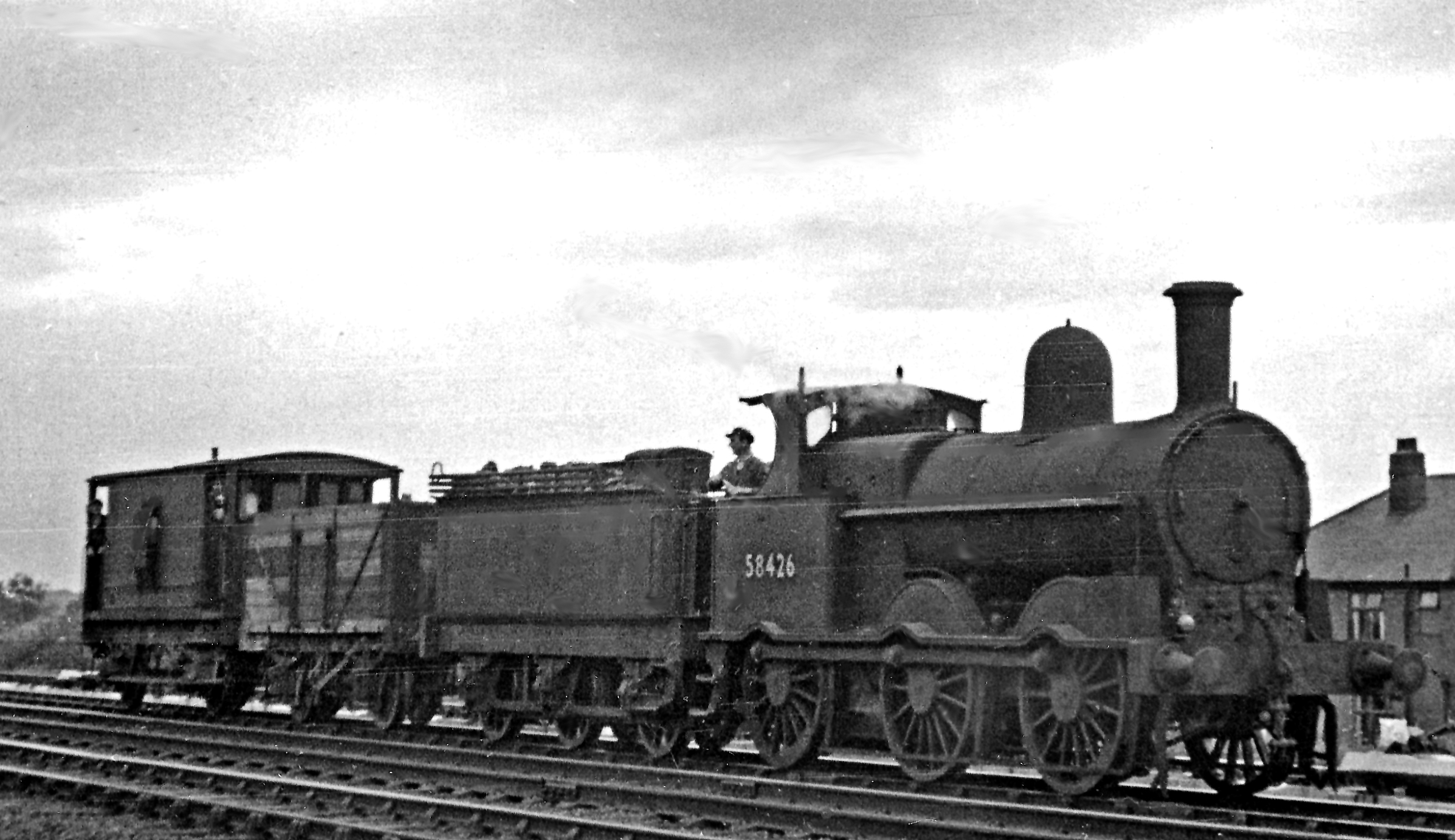
No. 58426 on a local goods at Adswood Sidings

The LNWR 18-inch Goods was a class of 310 0-6-0 type steam locomotives built by the London and North Western Railway at their Crewe Works between 1880 and 1902.

They were also known officially as the Express Goods 5 ft 0in, and unofficially as the Crested Goods or Cauliflower Class, due to the application of the large LNWR crest on the middle splasher in the original livery.

== Design ==
The design featured a boiler pressed to 150 lbf/in^{2} (1.03 MPa) delivering saturated steam to two 18 by 24 in (457 by 610 mm) cylinders connected by Joy valve gear to the driving wheels.

The dimensions quoted in the class title could be misleading: several locomotives ran for a period with 17-or-17 1/2-inch (432 or 444 mm) cylinders; and the “5ft 0in” referred to the diameter of the wheel centres – measured of the tyres the diameter was 5 ft 2 1/2 in (1,588 mm).

A tank locomotive version was also produced as the LNWR 18in Tank Class 0-6-2T.

== Service ==
Two locomotives were withdrawn before the 1923 Grouping, leaving 308 to pass to the London, Midland and Scottish Railway, who gave them power classification 2F, and renumbered them 8315–8624. The LMS later added them to the duplicate list by the addition of 20000 to their numbers to make room for additional Class 8F locomotives.

Sixty-nine locomotives entered British Railways (BR) stock in 1948. BR allocated them the numbers 58362–58430, as adding 40000 to their numbers as was done with most ex-LMS locomotives would have taken them into the 6xxxx ex-LNER series. The last one was withdrawn from British Railways service in 1955. None were preserved.
