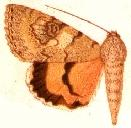

Scientific classification
- Kingdom: Animalia
- Phylum: Arthropoda
- Class: Insecta
- Order: Lepidoptera
- Superfamily: Noctuoidea
- Family: Erebidae
- Genus: Catocala
- Species: C. neglecta

Binomial name
- Catocala neglecta Staudinger, 1888

= Catocala neglecta =

Species of moth

Catocala neglecta is a moth of the family Erebidae. It is found in Mongolia.
