= Clapton Nursery =

Plant nursery in Upper Clapton, London, England

Coordinates: 51.5649°N 0.0583°W

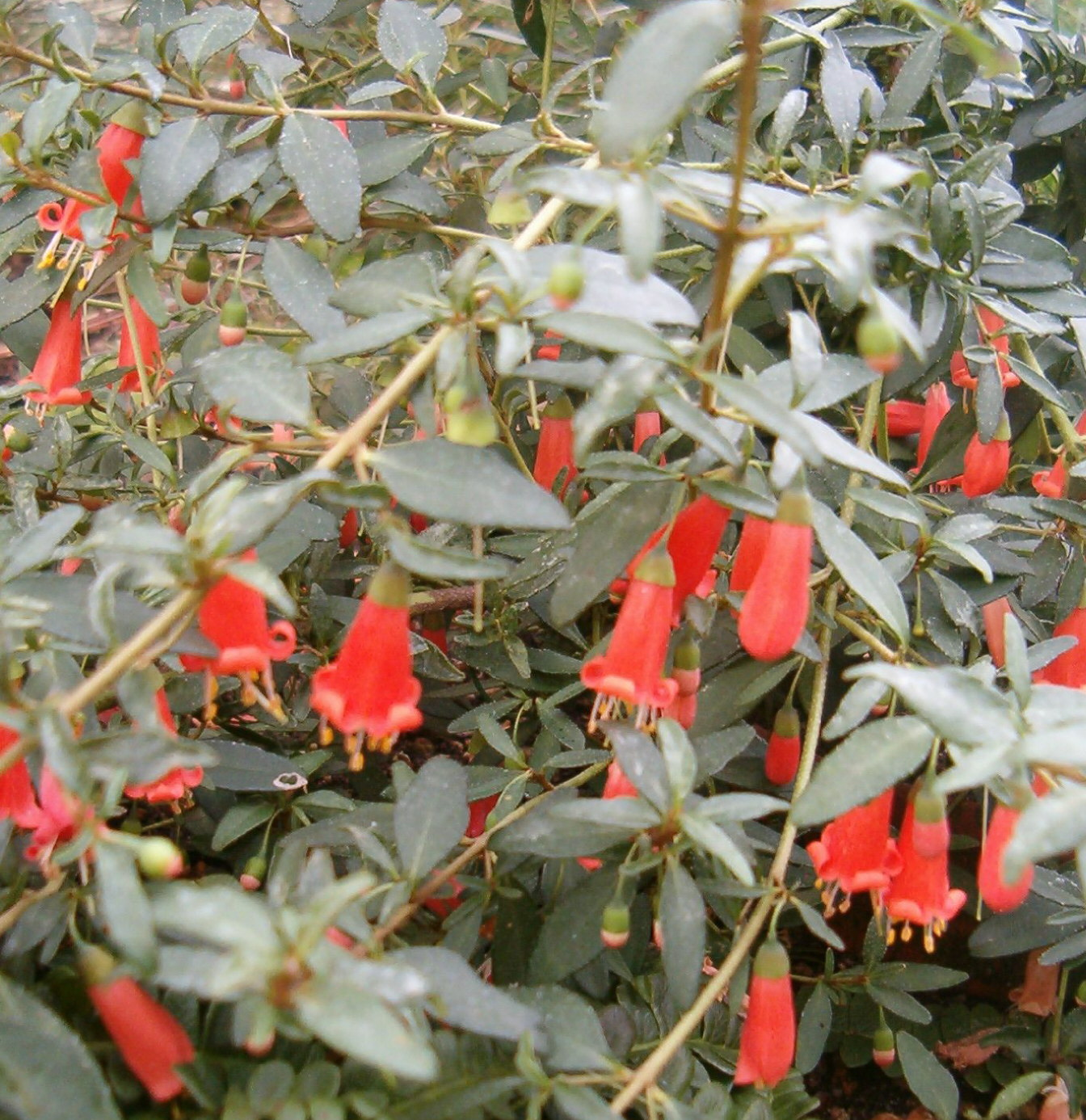
The Australian plant Correa pulchella was introduced into cultivation by the Clapton Nursery in about 1824.

The Clapton Nursery also known as Mackay's Clapton Nursery and later Low's Clapton Nursery was a plant nursery established in the early 19th century by John Bain Mackay in Upper Clapton, London, and noted for its introductions of Australian and South American plants into cultivation.

The nursery propagated plant material sent by William Baxter from Australia and James Anderson from South America. A garden library was established at the nursery in 1827. In 1831 the foreman and propagator, Hugh Low, took over the nursery. Low was a Scots horticulturalist who commenced work at the nursery after arriving in London in about 1823. His son, Hugh, also became involved with the nursery.

The nursery corresponded with Sir William Hooker and supplied the Royal Botanic Gardens, Kew with seed and cuttings.
