= Supplementum primum Prodromi florae Novae Hollandiae =

Book by Robert Brown

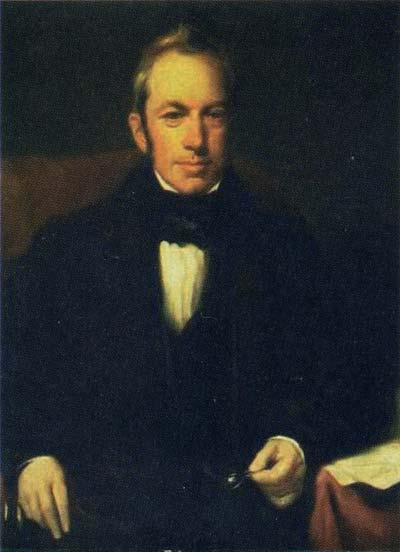
Picture of Robert Brown

Supplementum primum Prodromi florae Novae Hollandiae ("First supplement to the Prodromus of the flora of New Holland") is an 1830 supplement to Robert Brown's Prodromus florae Novae Hollandiae et Insulae Van Diemen. It may be referred to by its standard botanical abbreviation Suppl. Prodr. Fl. Nov. Holl.

The supplement published numerous new Proteaceae taxa, mainly those discovered by William Baxter since the publication of the original Prodromus in 1810.
