= William Baxter (botanist) =

English gardener

William Baxter (born 1787 - died between 1830 and 1836) was an English gardener who collected in Australia on behalf of English nurserymen and private individuals. He had developed his horticultural reputation as gardener to the Comtesse de Vandes in Bayswater, London, many of the plants he had nurtured being used for illustrations in Curtis's Botanical Magazine. He was the first privately financed plant collector to be sent to Australia, his mission being to collect seeds and roots for the London seedsman F. Henchman.

Baxter's collections were made at Kangaroo Island (1822–1823), the southern coast of Western Australia (1823–1825), at King George Sound, Cape Arid and Lucky Bay, Twofold Bay, and Wilsons Promontory, Victoria (1826). The final expedition to Western Australia (1828–1829) was arranged by Charles Fraser. On his return they disagreed about the distribution of the collected material.

Baxter's name is commemorated in epithets, such as species Hakea baxteri R.Br., and Eucalyptus baxteri, and the genus Baxteria was named in his honour. He is thought to have died about 1836.

The main part of his collections are held at Kew and the British Museum. Material supplied by Baxter's expedition was propagated at the Clapton Nursery.

== See also ==
- List of gardener-botanist explorers of the Enlightenment
- Banksia dryandroides for the history and description of the Banksia species that Baxter collected.
