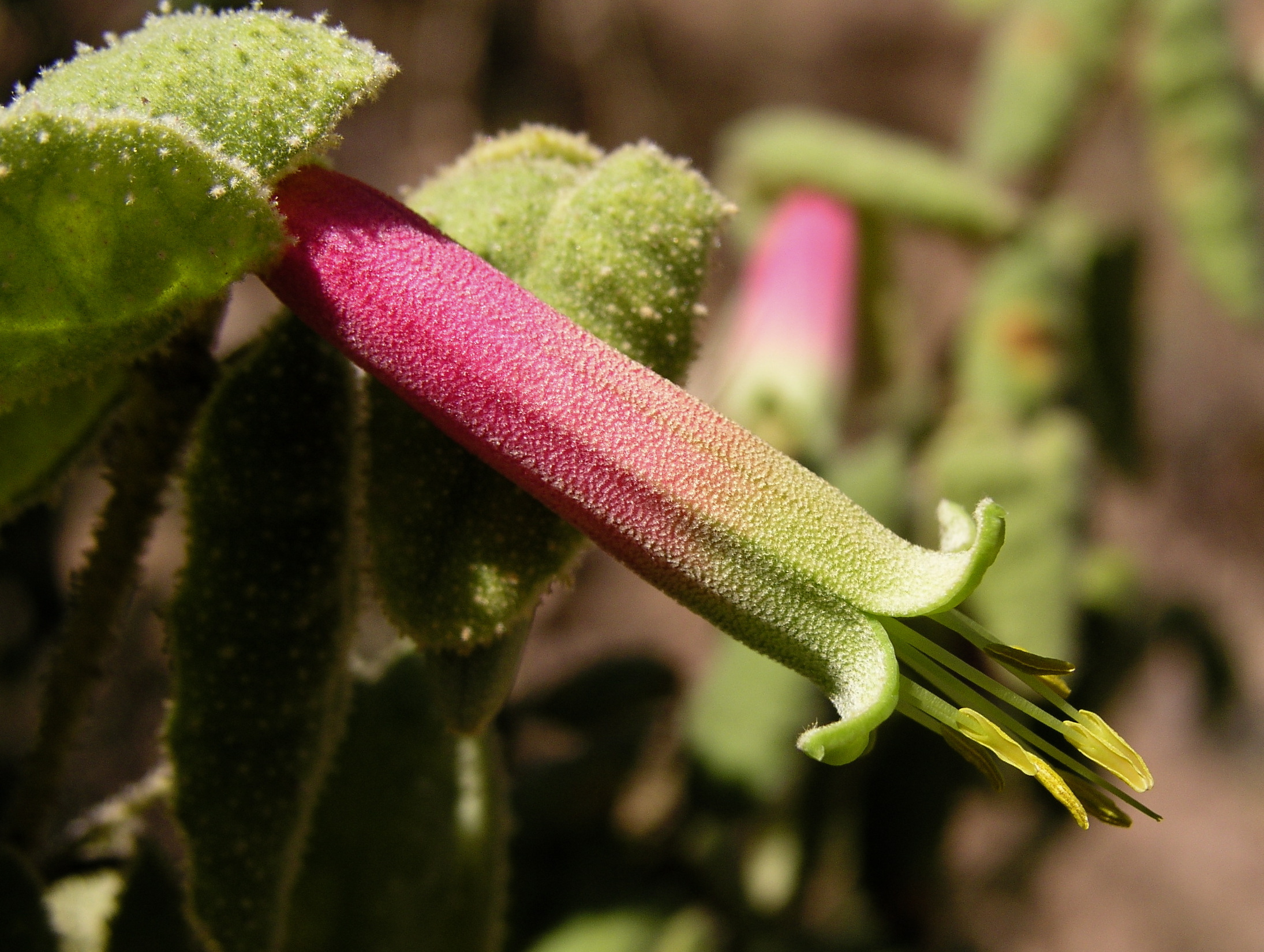

Scientific classification
- Kingdom: Plantae
- Clade: Embryophytes
- Clade: Tracheophytes
- Clade: Spermatophytes
- Clade: Angiosperms
- Clade: Eudicots
- Clade: Rosids
- Order: Sapindales
- Family: Rutaceae
- Genus: Correa
- Species: C. reflexa

Binomial name
- Correa reflexa (Labill.) Vent.

Synonyms
- Antommarchia rubra Colla; Antommarchia speciosa (W.T.Aiton) Schltdl.; Correa cordifolia Lindl.; Correa magnifica Gentil; Correa rubra Sm.; Correa speciosa Donn ex Andrews; Correa speciosa W.T.Aiton; Correa ventricosa E.Thurst.; Correa virens Hook. nom. illeg.; Correa virens Sm.; Correa viridiflora Andrews; Mazeutoxeron reflexum Labill.

= Correa reflexa =

Species of plant

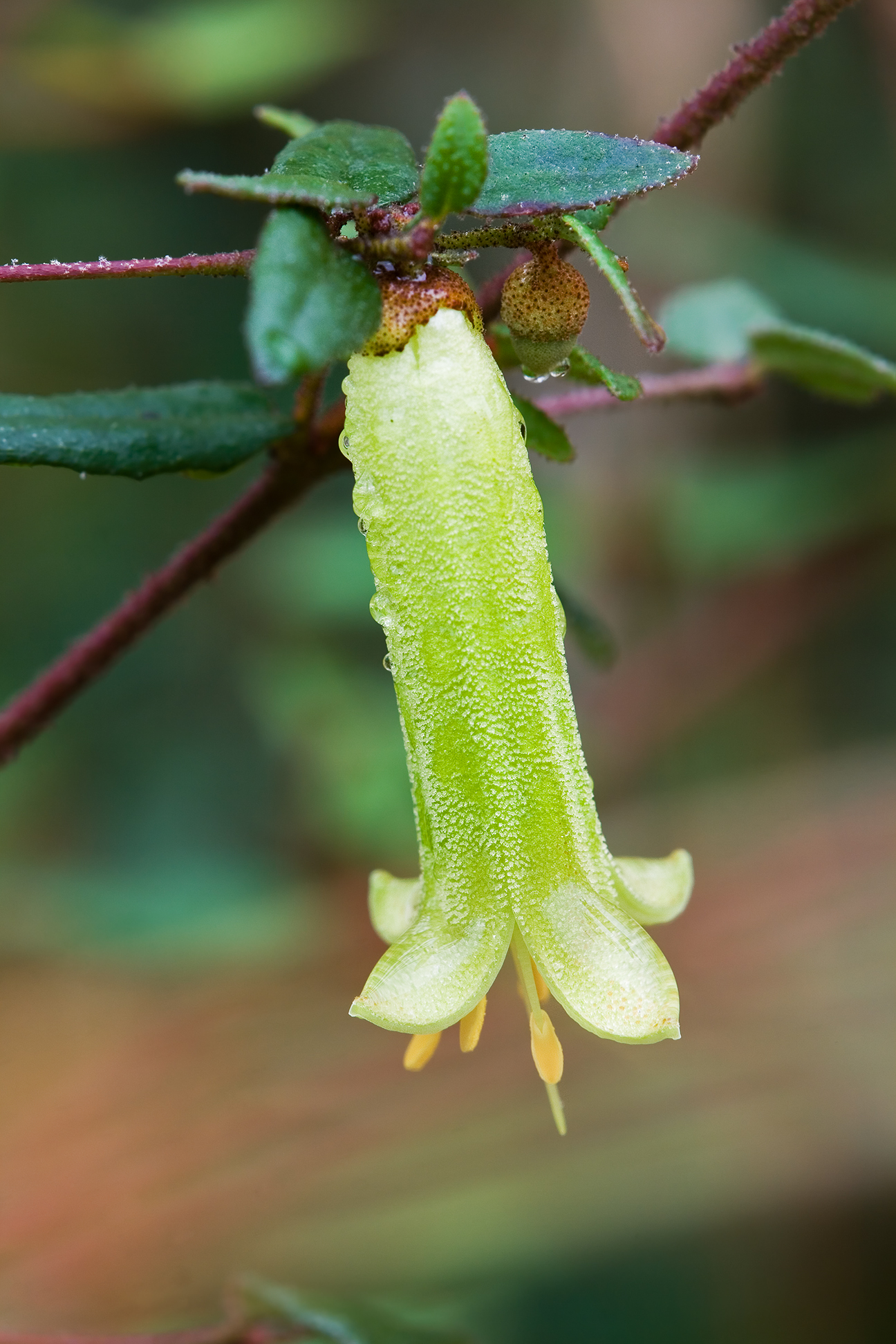
Correa reflexa, green form

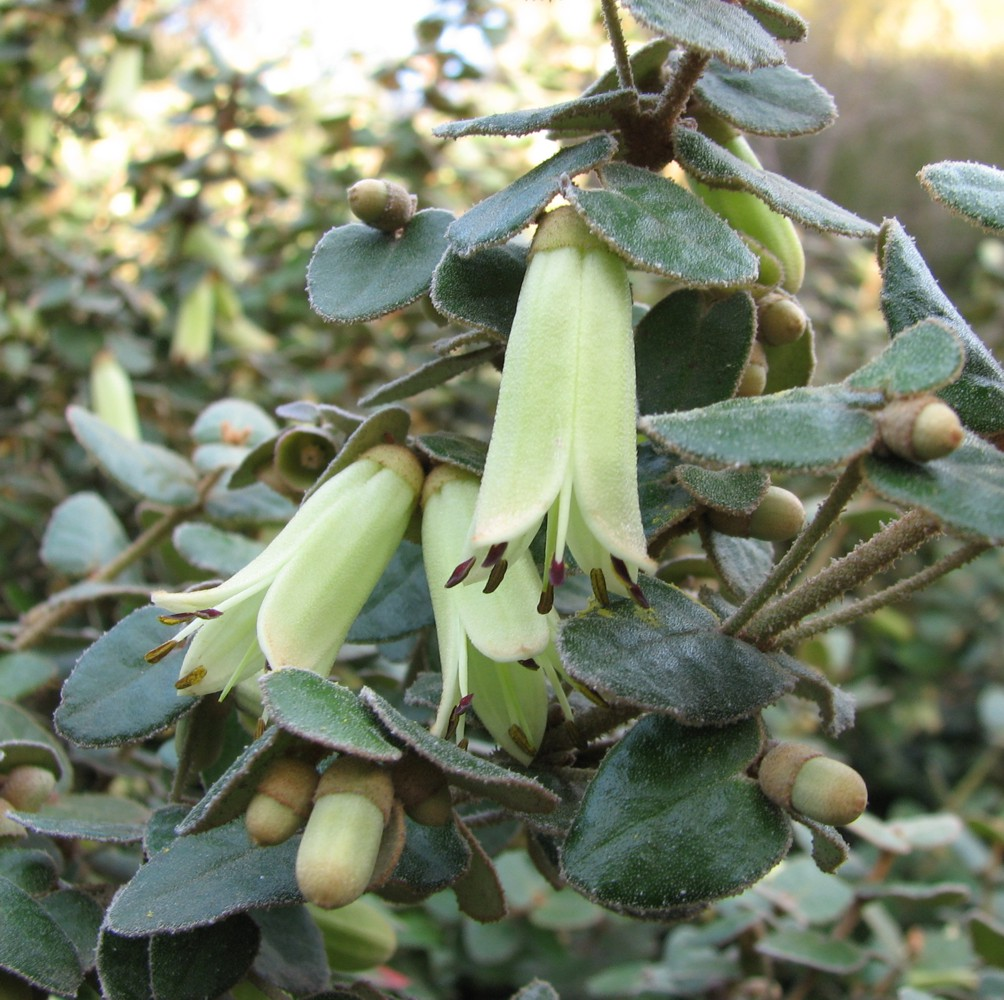
Correa reflexa var. nummulariifolia

Correa reflexa, commonly known as common correa or native fuchsia, is a shrub which is endemic to Australia.

== Description ==
Plants are quite variable and a large number of varieties and local forms have been identified. Heights vary from prostrate to 1.5 metres high. Leaves are generally oval in shape and range from 10 mm to 50 mm long. Their surfaces often have visible oil glands and short hairs. The pendant, tubular flowers occur in groups of 1 to 3 and are up to 40 mm long with 4 flaring triangular tips. Colour is variable including pale green, red with yellow tips and other variations.

== Taxonomy ==
The species was first formally described in 1800 by botanist Jacques Labillardière in Relation du Voyage à la Recherche de la Pérouse based on the type from Adventure Bay in southern Tasmania. He gave it the name Mazeutoxeron reflexum and published the description in Relation du Voyage à la Recherche de la Pérouse. The species was transferred to the genus Correa as C. reflexa in 1803 by Étienne Pierre Ventenat in Jardin de la Malmaison.

The following varieties are accepted by the Australian Plant Census:

- C. reflexa var. angustifolia Paul G.Wilson - Grampians correa (Vic.)
- C. reflexa var. insularis Paul G.Wilson (S.A.)
- C. reflexa var. lobata Paul G.Wilson - Powelltown correa (Vic.)
- C. reflexa var. nummulariifolia (Hook.f.) Paul G.Wilson - roundleaf correa (Tas.)
- C. reflexa (Labill.) Vent. var. reflexa (S.A., Qld., N.S.W., A.C.T., Vic., Tas.)
- C. reflexa var. scabridula Paul G.Wilson - western correa (S.A., Vic.)
- C. reflexa var. speciosa (Donn ex Andrews) Paul G.Wilson - eastern correa (N.S.W., Vic.)

Natural hybrids have been recorded with Correa alba, C. pulchella, C. aemula and C. decumbens.

== Use in horticulture ==
Correa reflexa prefers a position with good drainage and some shade. The species is generally not suited to tropical regions, although use of forms from sub-tropical areas of New South Wales may afford some success. Tip pruning after flowering promotes a more compact form and enhanced flowering in the following season. Plants are generally pest and disease free. Propagation from seed is difficult, but plants may be readily propagated from semi-mature cuttings of new seasons growth which also ensures plants are true-to-form.

Correa reflexa has received the Royal Horticultural Society's Award of Garden Merit.

=== Cultivars ===
- C. reflexa 'Briagalong'
- C. reflexa 'Brisbane Range'
- C. reflexa 'Carpenter Rocks'
- C. reflexa 'Clearview Fairy'
- C. reflexa 'Clearview Large Red'
- C. reflexa 'Crystalline'
- C. reflexa 'Dawn Glow'
- C. reflexa 'Desert Glow'
- C. reflexa x C. pulchella 'Dusky Bells',
- C. reflexa 'Dutchembegarra'
- C. reflexa 'Fat Fred'
- C. reflexa 'Icicle'
- C. reflexa 'Kangaroo Island'
- C. reflexa 'Lemon and Lime'
- C. reflexa 'Maroondah Tricolor'
- C. reflexa 'Mary's Choice'
- C. reflexa 'Maryborough'
- C. reflexa 'Mountain Giant'
- C. reflexa 'Clearview Giant'
- C. reflexa 'Mt Richmond Red'
- C. reflexa 'Narrow Neil'
- C. reflexa 'Old Gold'
- C. reflexa 'Portland Dawn Glow'
- C. reflexa 'Portland Peach'
- C. reflexa 'Portland'
- C. reflexa 'S.E. Gippsland'
- C. reflexa 'Squat Queen'
- C. reflexa 'Squat'
- C. reflexa 'Wildfire'
- C. reflexa 'Wilson's Promontory Lime and Gold'
- C. reflexa 'Lemon and Lime'
- C. reflexa 'Yanakie'
