= Correa reflexa var. lobata =

Scientific classification
- Kingdom: Plantae
- Clade: Tracheophytes
- Clade: Angiosperms
- Clade: Eudicots
- Clade: Rosids
- Order: Sapindales
- Family: Rutaceae
- Genus: Correa
- Species: C. reflexa
- Variety: C. r. var. lobata

Trinomial name
- Correa reflexa var. lobata Paul G.Wilson

Synonyms
- Correa aff. aemula (Powelltown)

Variety of flowering plant

Correa reflexa var. lobata, commonly known as Powelltown correa is a variety of Correa reflexa endemic to Victoria in Australia. It grows to 2 metres tall. Leaves are up to 40 mm long and 25 mm wide and are dark green on the upper surface, while the lower surface is covered with hairs and pale grey The pendent, tubular flowers are yellow-green with protruding stamens and appear from March to October in the varieties native range.

The variety was first formally described by Paul G. Wilson in the botanical journal Nuytsia in 1998 It occurs to the east of Melbourne in the Dandenong Ranges and Powelltown area in heathy woodland in high rainfall areas with altitudes ranging from 60 to 500 metres AHD.

The Poweltown correa is listed as "Rare in Victoria" on the Department of Sustainability and Environment's Advisory List of Rare Or Threatened Plants In Victoria.
