= Correa eburnea =

Deep Creek correa

Conservation status
- Endangered (EPBC Act)

Scientific classification
- Kingdom: Plantae
- Clade: Tracheophytes
- Clade: Angiosperms
- Clade: Eudicots
- Clade: Rosids
- Order: Sapindales
- Family: Rutaceae
- Genus: Correa
- Species: C. eburnea

Binomial name
- Correa eburnea Paul G.Wilson

Synonyms
- Correa sp. aff. calycina; Correa reflexa auct. non (Labill.) Vent.

Species of plant

Correa eburnea, commonly known as the Deep Creek correa, is a species of shrub that is endemic to the Fleurieu Peninsula in South Australia. It has papery, elliptic to egg-shaped leaves, and up to five green, nodding flowers arranged in leaf axils.

== Description ==
Correa eburnea is a shrub that typically grows to a height of 1–4 m (3–10 ft) and has branchlets covered with rust-coloured hairs. The leaves are papery, egg-shaped to elliptical, mostly 30–50 mm (1.2–2.0 in) long on a short petiole and covered with minute white hairs on the lower surface. The flowers are arranged singly or in groups of up to five in leaf axils, each flower nodding on a pedicel about 2 mm (0.079 in) long with two round to heart-shaped bracts 10–25 mm (0.39–0.98 in) long at the base of the flowers. The calyx is cup-shaped, 4–7 mm (0.16–0.28 in) long including the four triangular teeth about 1.5 mm (0.059 in) long. The corolla is green, 18–25 mm (0.71–0.98 in) long and covered with green hairs. The stamens protrude from the end of the corolla.

== Taxonomy ==
Correa eburnea was first formally described by Paul G. Wilson in 1998 in the botanic journal Nuytsia from plant material collected in 1991 from Deep Creek Conservation Park on the Fleurieu Peninsula by Robert John Bates.

== Distribution and habitat ==
Deep Creek correa occurs near Encounter Bay where it grows on the banks of damp creeks and on cliff tops near the mouths of major creeks on the southern Fleurieu Peninsula. Most individuals are in the Deep Creek Conservation Park.

== Conservation status ==
This correa is listed as endangered under the Australian Government Environment Protection and Biodiversity Conservation Act 1999 and the South Australian Government National Parks and Wildlife Act, 1972. The main threats to the species are vegetation clearing and grazing by cattle.
