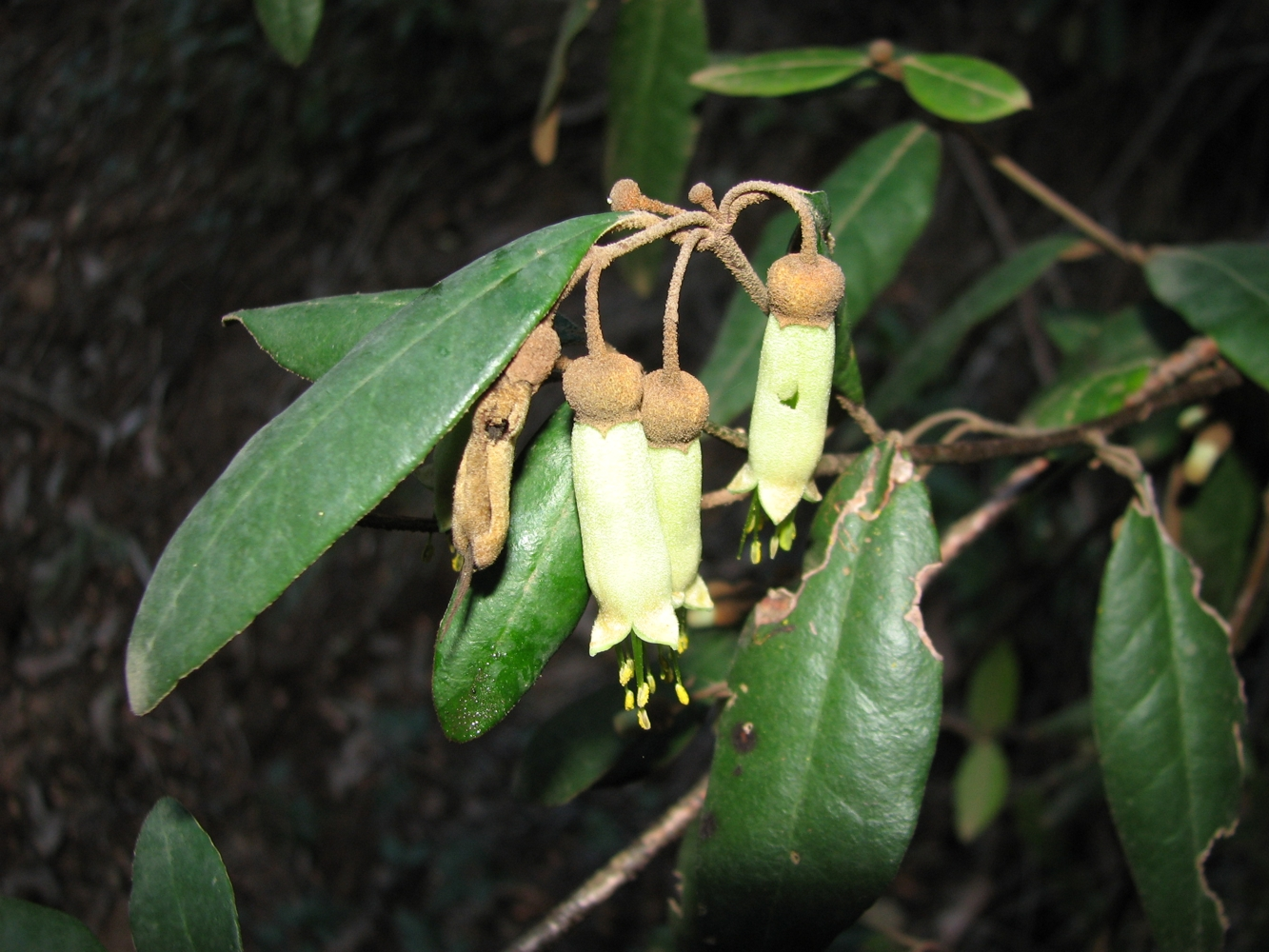
- Correa lawrenceana var. latrobeana in Yarra Ranges National Park

Scientific classification
- Kingdom: Plantae
- Clade: Tracheophytes
- Clade: Angiosperms
- Clade: Eudicots
- Clade: Rosids
- Order: Sapindales
- Family: Rutaceae
- Genus: Correa
- Species: C. lawrenceana

Binomial name
- Correa lawrenceana Hook.

Synonyms
- Correa lawrenciana Hook.Backh.

= Correa lawrenceana =

Mountain correa

Species of flowering plant

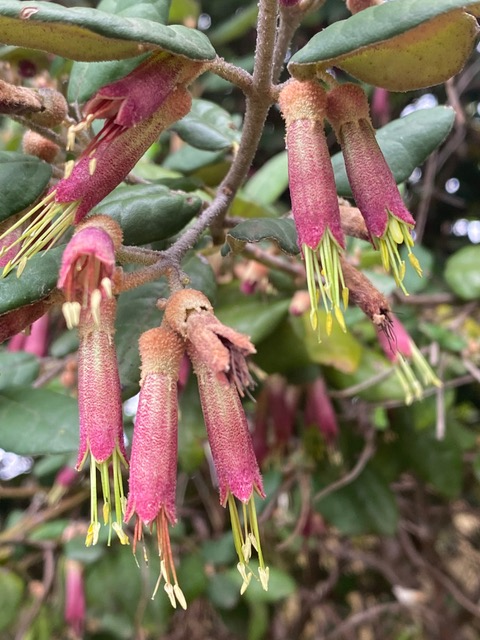
Correa lawrenceana var. latrobeana (reddish-mauve form)

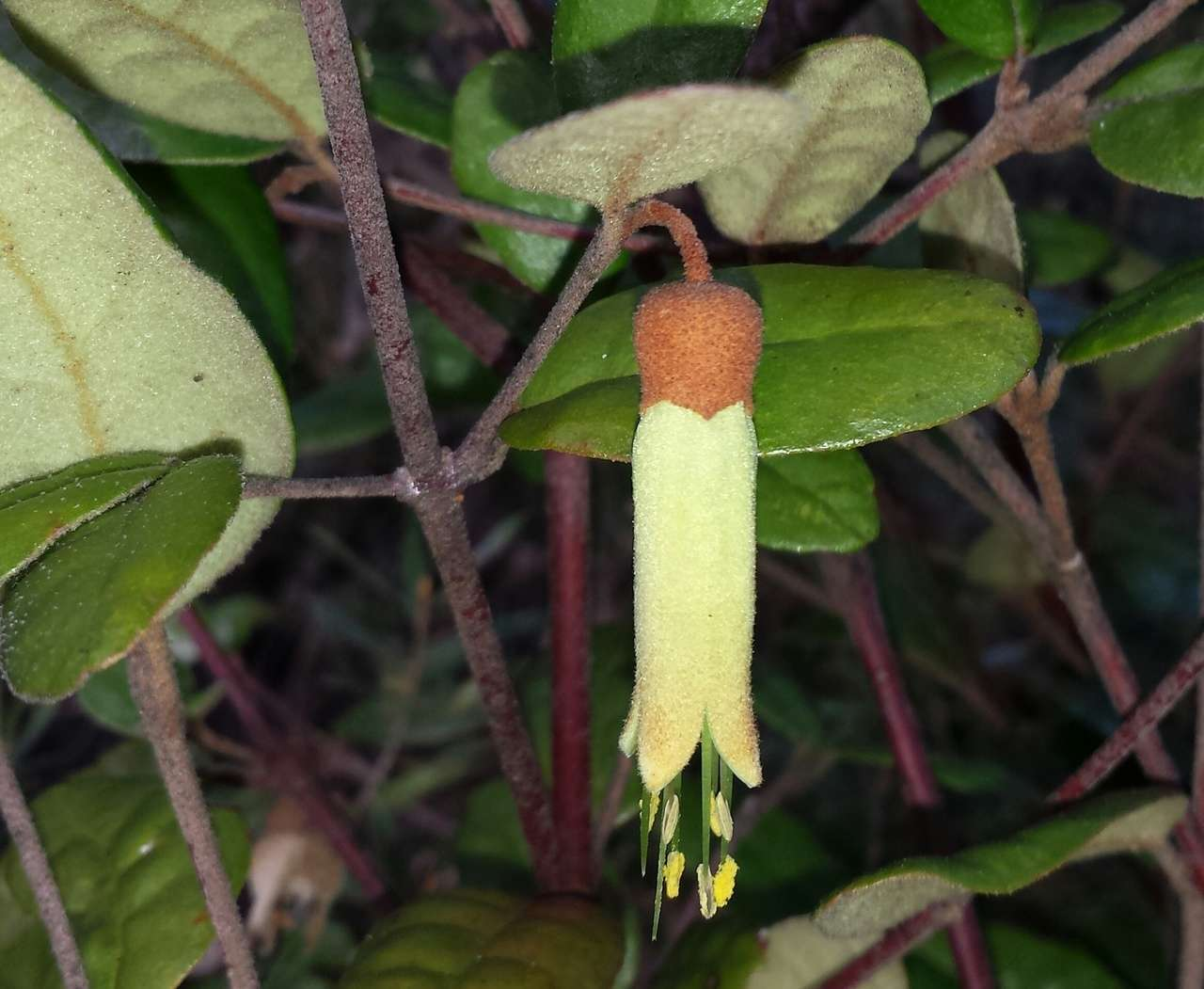
Correa lawrenceana var. grampiana in the Grampians

Correa lawrenceana, commonly known as mountain correa, is a species of shrub or small tree of the family Rutaceae and is endemic to Australia. It has elliptical to egg-shaped leaves arranged in opposite pairs and cylindrical, greenish yellow to red flowers usually arranged singly or in groups of up to seven in leaf axils with the stamens protruding beyond the end of the corolla.

== Description ==
Correa lawrenceana is a shrub that typically grows to a height of 0.6–9 m (2 ft 0 in – 29 ft 6 in), sometimes a tree to 16 m (52 ft), and has branchlets covered with rusty hairs. The leaves are arranged in opposite pairs, elliptical to egg-shaped, 13–120 mm (0.51–4.72 in) long and 7–70 mm (0.28–2.76 in) wide on a petiole up to 16 mm (0.63 in) long. The flowers are arranged singly or in groups of up to seven in leaf axils, rarely on the ends of branchlets, each flower on a pedicel 5–50 mm (0.20–1.97 in) long. The calyx is hemispherical to cup-shaped, 3–10 mm (0.12–0.39 in) long and 4–6 mm (0.16–0.24 in) wide. The corolla is cylindrical, greenish yellow to red with a scaly to velvety surface, 12–50 mm (0.47–1.97 in) long with four short lobes on the end. The stamens project well beyond the end of the corolla. Flowering occurs in spring and sporadically at other times.

== Taxonomy ==
This species was first described in 1834 by English botanist William Jackson Hooker who gave it the name Correa lawrenciana and published the description in his journal, The Journal of Botany. The specific epithet honours Tasmanian botanist Robert William Lawrence (1807-1833) who, together with Ronald Gunn, collected the plant material sent to Hooker. In 1998, Paul Wilson corrected the name to Correa lawrenceana to conform to the Tokyo Code.

A subgenus of Correa (Correa subgenus Persistens Othman, Duretto and G.J. Jord.) was formally described in 2011 comprising two species, C. lawrenceana and C. baeuerlenii. Unlike other Correa species, C. lawrenceana does not readily form hybrids with other species.

The names of eight varieties are accepted at the Australian Plant Census:

- Correa lawrenceana var. cordifolia Paul G.Wilson, commonly known as pink mountain-correa, is distinguished by its broadly elliptic to broadly heart-shaped leaves and hairy calyx 4–5 mm (0.16–0.20 in) long.
- Correa lawrenceana var. genoensis Paul G.Wilson, commonly known as Genoa River correa, is distinguished by its broadly elliptic to broadly heart-shaped leaves and glabrous green calyx 9–12 mm (0.35–0.47 in) long.
- Correa lawrenceana var. glandulifera Paul G.Wilson has elliptic or egg-shaped leaves, a shallow hemispherical calyx about 2 mm (0.079 in) long covered with star-shaped hairs and a yellowish green corolla.
- Correa lawrenceana var. grampiana Paul G.Wilson, commonly known as Grampians mountain-correa, has leathery, broadly elliptical leaves, a calyx covered with woolly rust-coloured hairs and a cylindrical corolla covered with velvety hairs.
- Correa lawrenceana. var. latrobeana (F.Muell. ex Hannaford) Paul G.Wilson is distinguished by its broadly elliptic to broadly heart-shaped leaves and hairy calyx 4–7 mm (0.16–0.28 in) long.
- Correa lawrenceana Hook. var. lawrenceana has narrow elliptical leaves 20–40 mm (0.79–1.57 in) long and a green corolla.
- Correa lawrenceana var. macrocalyx (Blakely) Paul G.Wilson is similar to var. cordifolia but has a calyx 5–10 mm (0.20–0.39 in) long.
- Correa lawrenceana var. rosea Paul G.Wilson has narrow elliptical leaves 40–60 mm (1.6–2.4 in) long, a calyx 3–5 mm (0.12–0.20 in) long and a narrow cylindrical corolla that is pink to dull red with green lobes.

Some varieties grade into each other, and the delineation between them is imprecise.

== Distribution and habitat ==
The species is found in rainforest and sclerophyll forest in Tasmania, Victoria, New South Wales, the Australian Capital Territory and Queensland. Variety cordifolia grows in forest on the coast and tablelands of southern New South Wales, the Australian Capital Territory and far north-eastern Victoria. Variety genoensis is only known from the banks of the Genoa River near the New South Wales - Victoria border. Variety glandulifera is found in the mountains from the Gibraltar Range in New South Wales to the McPherson Range in south-eastern Queensland. Variety grampiana grows among rocks in mountain areas, mainly in the Grampians. Variety latrobeana is found in south-eastern New South Wales and eastern Victoria. Variety lawrenceana occurs in mountainous areas in Tasmania and the Australian Capital Territory, var. macrocalyx is found in mountainous areas between the Taree and the Illawarra regions in New South Wales and var. rosea is only found in the Snowy Mountains of New South Wales.

== Ecology ==
The flowers are presumed to be pollinated by either birds or bees.

== Use in horticulture ==
Correa lawrenceana is suited to a cool, moist, partly shaded position and is known to tolerate frost and snow. It can be used as a screening plant and will attract honeyeaters to the garden. Plants are easily propagated from cuttings, whereas seed can be difficult.
