= Correa reflexa var. speciosa =

Scientific classification
- Kingdom: Plantae
- Clade: Tracheophytes
- Clade: Angiosperms
- Clade: Eudicots
- Clade: Rosids
- Order: Sapindales
- Family: Rutaceae
- Genus: Correa
- Species: C. reflexa
- Variety: C. r. var. speciosa

Trinomial name
- Correa reflexa var. speciosa Paul G.Wilson

Synonyms
- Correa cardinalis F.Muell. ex Hook. Correa speciosa Donn ex Andrews; Correa speciosa f. cardinalis (F.Muell. ex Hook.) Siebert & Voss; Correa speciosa var. cardinalis (F.Muell. ex Hook.) Stirling

Variety of flowering plant

Correa reflexa var. speciosa, also known as eastern correa, is a variety of Correa reflexa, a shrub native to Australia.

== Description ==
It grows up to 1.5 metres (4 feet 11 inches) tall. Its leaves are up to 5 cm (2.0 in) long and 30 mm (1.2 in) wide and are dark green on the upper surface, while the lower surface is covered with hairs and pale grey. The pendent, tubular flowers are red with pale yellow tips.

== Taxonomy ==
The subspecies was originally formally described as a species in its own right, Correa speciosa in 1811 in The Botanist's Repository for New and Rare Plants. It was reclassified as subspecies of Correa reflexa by Paul G. Wilson in the botanical journal Nuytsia in 1998

Hybrids with Correa aemula and Correa reflexa var. scabridula have been recorded where populations intersect.

== Distribution ==
The subspecies occurs in New South Wales and Victoria in dry sclerophyll woodland and on coastal dunes.
