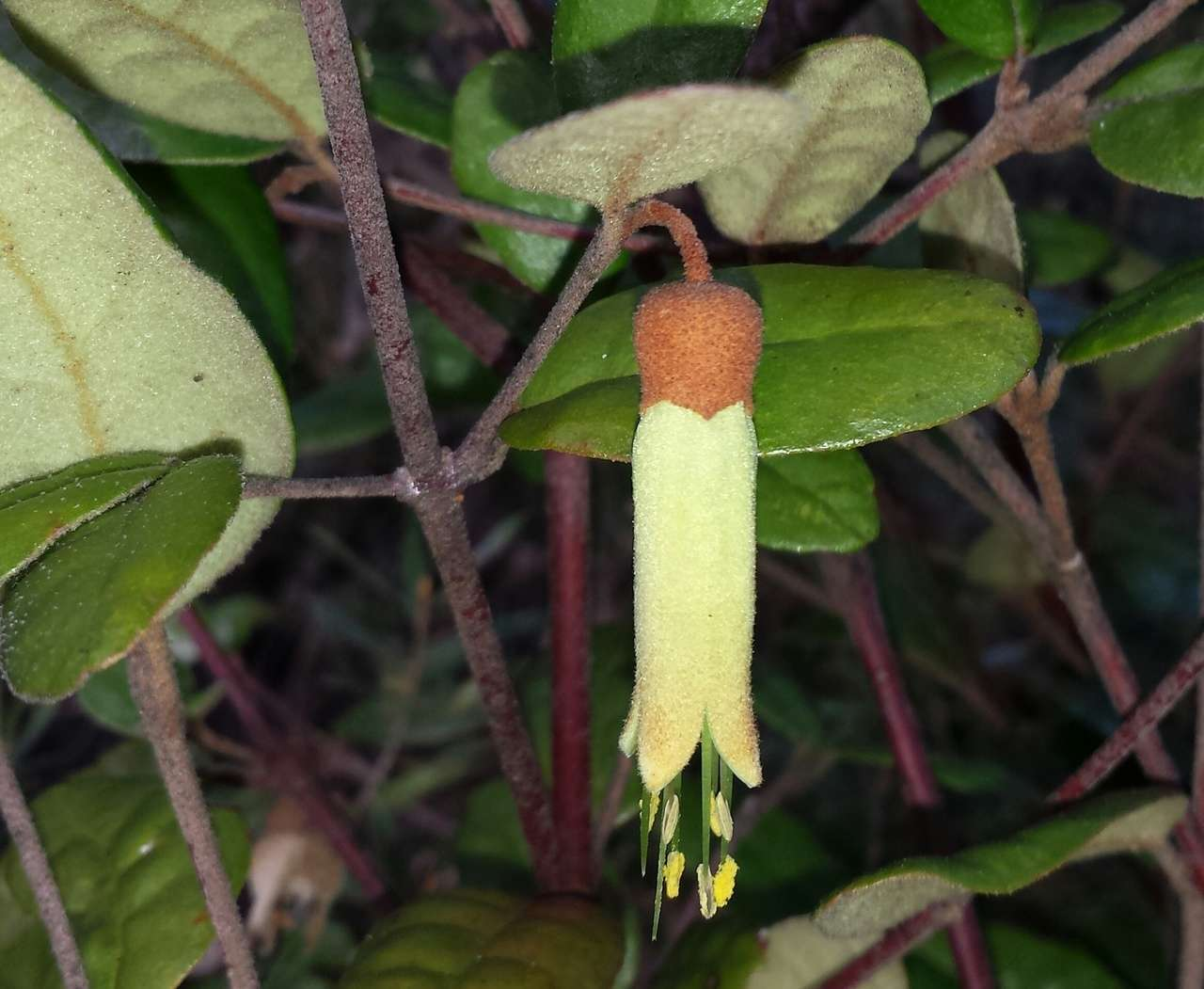
- In Grampians National Park

Scientific classification
- Kingdom: Plantae
- Clade: Tracheophytes
- Clade: Angiosperms
- Clade: Eudicots
- Clade: Rosids
- Order: Sapindales
- Family: Rutaceae
- Genus: Correa
- Species: C. lawrenceana
- Variety: C. l. var. grampiana

Trinomial name
- Correa lawrenceana var. grampiana Paul G.Wilson

= Correa lawrenceana var. grampiana =

Variety of flowering plant

Correa lawrenceana var. grampiana, commonly known as Grampians mountain-correa, is a variety of Correa lawrenceana that is endemic to Victoria, Australia. It is a shrub with elliptical leaves and cylindrical, velvety flowers covered with matted, woolly cream-coloured to yellowish brown hairs.

== Description ==
Correa lawrenceana var. grampiana is a shrub that typically grows to a height of 2.5 m (8 ft 2 in). Its leaves are arranged in opposite pairs, leathery, elliptical, mostly 20–40 mm (0.79–1.57 in) long, 10–17 mm (0.39–0.67 in) wide and covered with velvety, fawn-coloured hairs on the lower side. The flowers are arranged singly in leaf axils on a down-turned pedicel 2–5 mm (0.079–0.197 in) long. The calyx is cup-shaped, 5–7 mm (0.20–0.28 in) long, covered with woolly, rust-coloured hairs and with a wavy rim. The corolla is cylindrical, 15–25 mm (0.59–0.98 in) long and velvety, covered with a thick layer of cream-coloured to yellowish brown hairs.

== Taxonomy ==
The variety was first formally described by Paul Wilson in the journal Nuytsia in 1998, from specimens collected by David Albrecht on Mount William in 1986.

== Distribution and habitat ==
This correa grows among rocks in mountains in the Grampians and on nearby Mount Langi Ghiran.

== Conservation status ==
The Grampians Correa is listed as "Rare in Victoria" on the Department of Sustainability and Environment's Advisory List of Rare Or Threatened Plants In Victoria.
