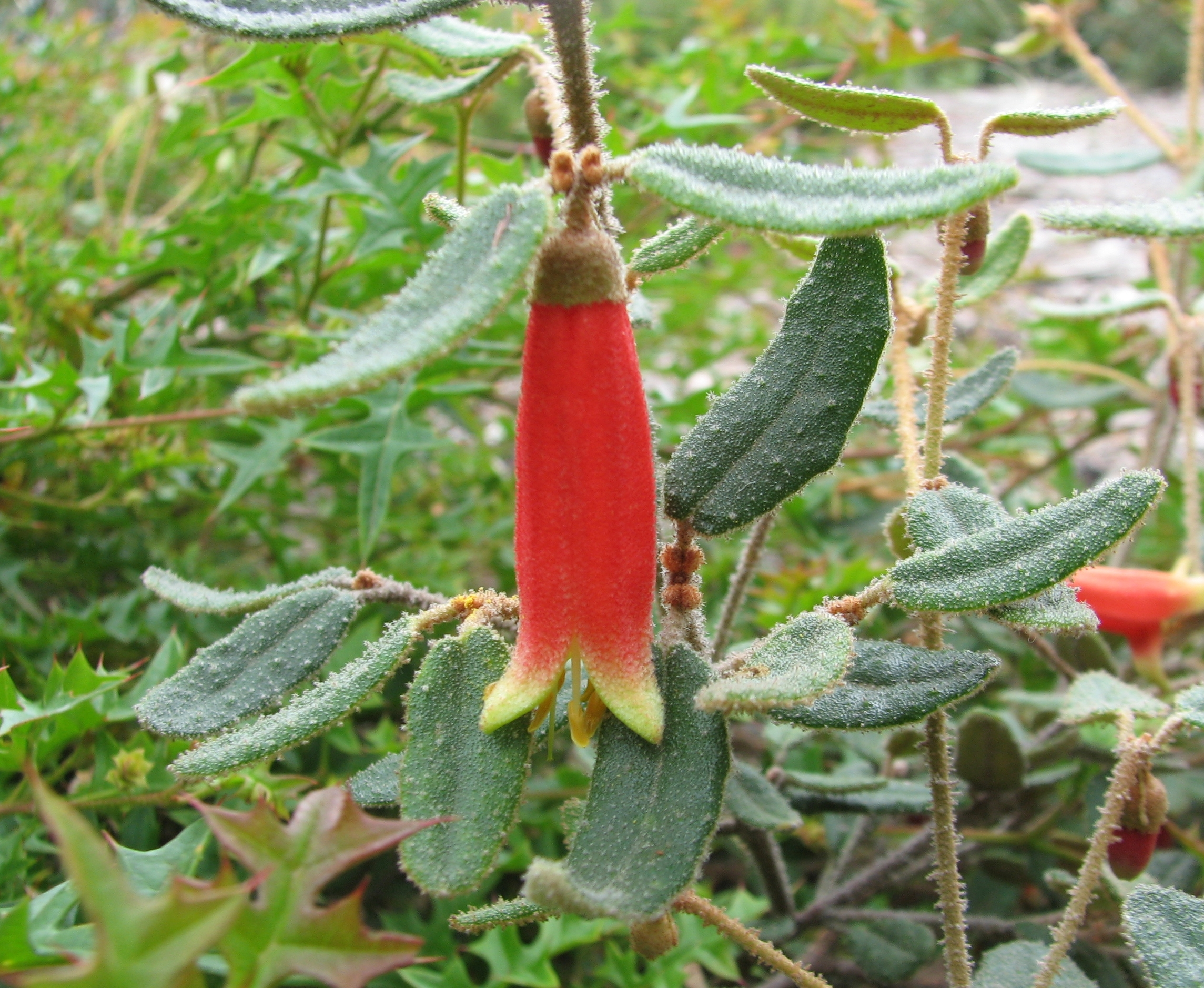

Scientific classification
- Kingdom: Plantae
- Clade: Tracheophytes
- Clade: Angiosperms
- Clade: Eudicots
- Clade: Rosids
- Order: Sapindales
- Family: Rutaceae
- Genus: Correa
- Species: C. reflexa
- Variety: C. r. var. angustifolia

Trinomial name
- Correa reflexa var. angustifolia Paul G.Wilson

Synonyms
- Correa sp. (Grampians)

= Correa reflexa var. angustifolia =

Variety of flowering plant

Correa reflexa var. angustifolia, commonly known as Grampians correa, is a variety of Correa reflexa endemic to Victoria in Australia. It grows to 1 metre (3 ft 3 in) tall. Leaves are up to 30 millimetres (1.2 in) long and 10 millimetres (0.39 in) wide and are dark green on the upper surface, while the lower surface is covered with hairs and pale grey. The pendent, tubular flowers are red with yellow-green tips.

The variety was first formally described by Paul G. Wilson in the botanical journal Nuytsia in 1998 It occurs in the Grampians region in heathy woodland in high rainfall areas with altitudes ranging from 668 to 824 metres AHD.

The Grampians correa is listed as "Rare in Victoria" on the Department of Sustainability and Environment's Advisory List of Rare Or Threatened Plants In Victoria.
