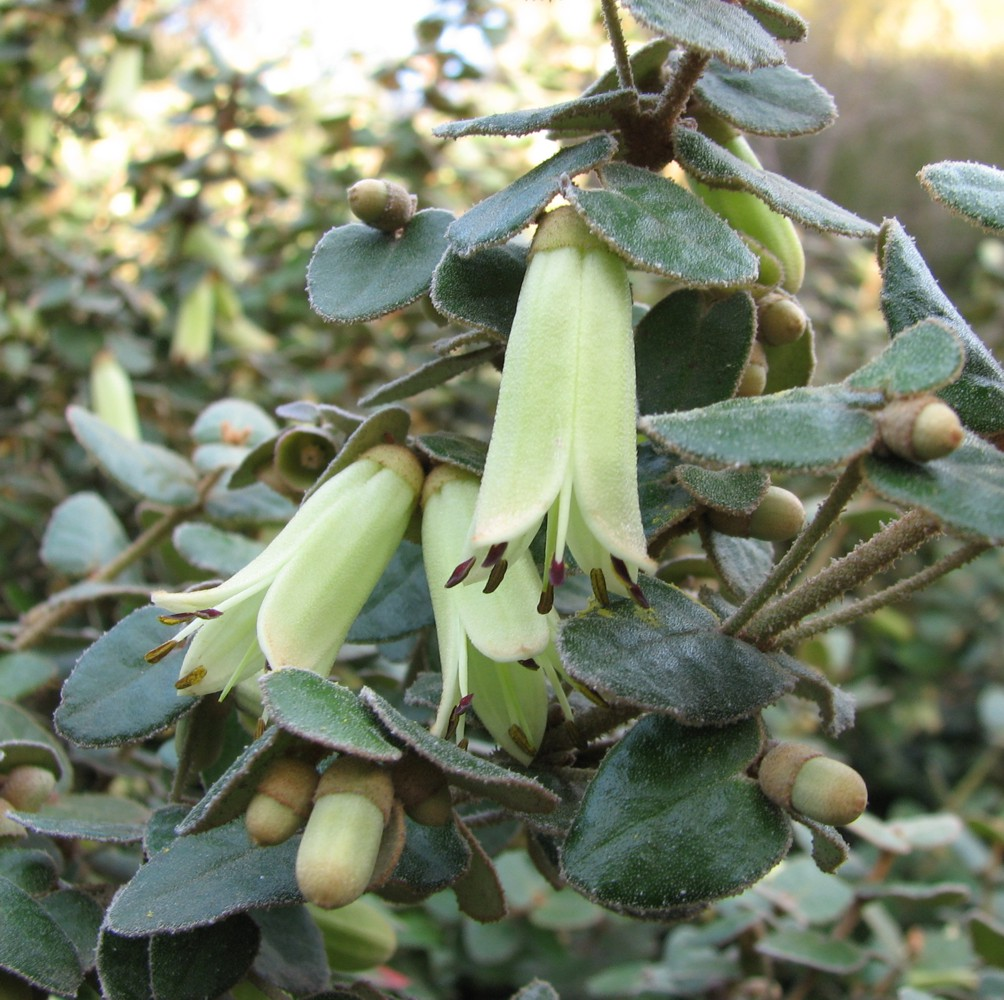

Scientific classification
- Kingdom: Plantae
- Clade: Tracheophytes
- Clade: Angiosperms
- Clade: Eudicots
- Clade: Rosids
- Order: Sapindales
- Family: Rutaceae
- Genus: Correa
- Species: C. reflexa
- Variety: C. r. var. nummulariifolia

Trinomial name
- Correa reflexa var. nummulariifolia (Hook.f.) Paul G.Wilson

Synonyms
- Correa speciosa var. nummulariifolia Hook.f.

= Correa reflexa var. nummulariifolia =

Variety of flowering plant

Correa reflexa var. nummulariifolia, also known as roundleaf correa, is a variety of Correa reflexa endemic to Tasmania in Australia. It is a small shrub with leaves that are up to 12–26 mm long and 6–15 mm wide. The pendent flowers are tubular and yellow-green. The variety's distribution is restricted to islands of the Furneaux Group in Bass Strait.

The subspecies was first formally described in 1855 by botanist Joseph Dalton Hooker who gave it the name Correa speciosa var. nummulariifolia. It was reassigned to the species Correa reflexa by Paul G. Wilson in 1961.

Plants with this name commonly available in the nursery industry in Australia are not true Correa reflexa var. nummulariifolia, but rather are a closely related form that grows near both the Victorian and northern Tasmanian coastline.
