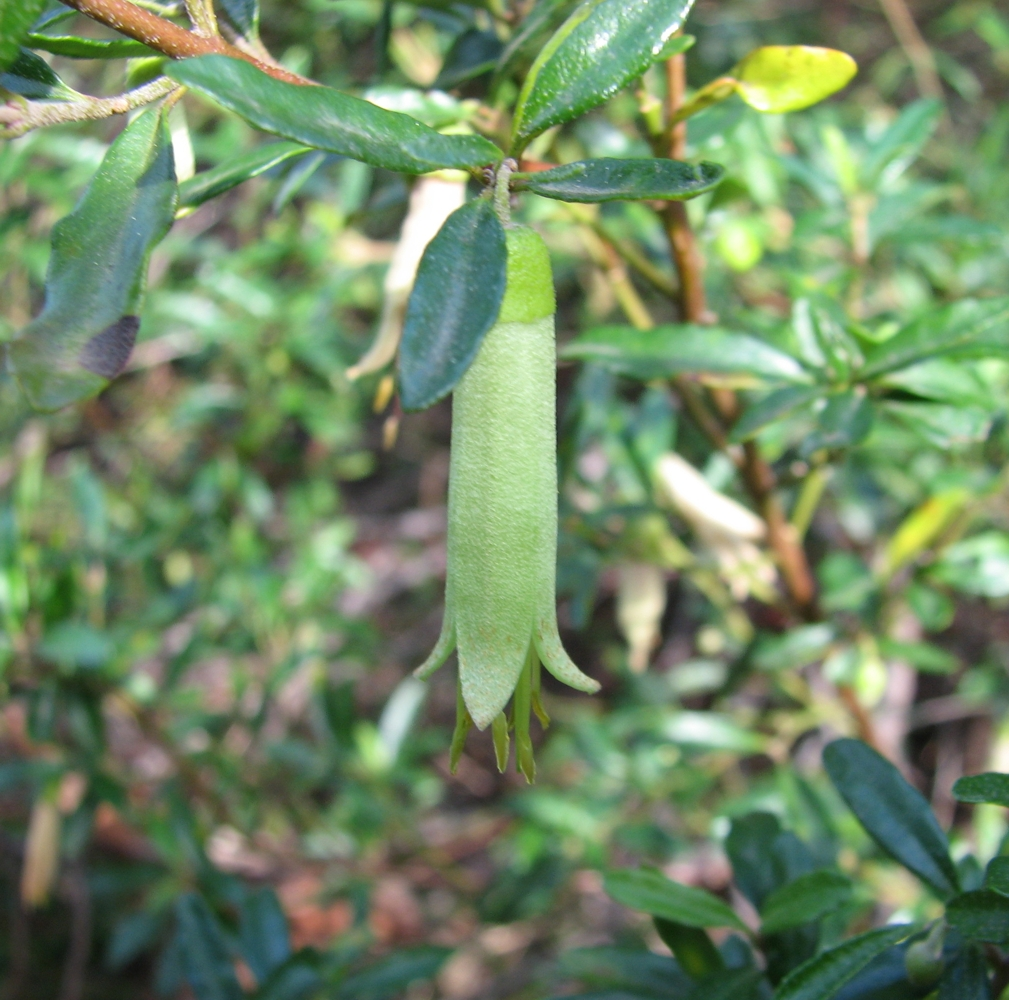
- Correa glabra in Burnley Gardens

Scientific classification
- Kingdom: Plantae
- Clade: Tracheophytes
- Clade: Angiosperms
- Clade: Eudicots
- Clade: Rosids
- Order: Sapindales
- Family: Rutaceae
- Genus: Correa
- Species: C. glabra

Binomial name
- Correa glabra Lindl.

Synonyms
- Corraea glabra F.Muell. orth. var.; Correa reflexa var. glabra (Lindl.) Court; Correa speciosa var. glabra (Lindl.) Benth.; Correa speciosa var. glabra (Lindl.) Maiden & Betche nom. superfl.; Correa rubra var. glabra (Lindl.) J.M.Black

= Correa glabra =

Rock correa

Species of plant

Correa glabra, commonly known as the rock correa, is a species of tall, erect shrub that is endemic to Australia. It usually has elliptical, mostly glabrous leaves and pendent, pale green to pale yellow flowers arranged singly on short side shoots.

== Description ==
Correa glabra is an erect shrub that typically grows to a height of 2.7 m (8 ft 10 in). The leaves are elliptical to sometimes egg-shaped with the narrower end towards the base, papery to leathery, 10–40 mm (0.39–1.57 in) long and 5–17 mm (0.20–0.67 in) wide with a strong, sweet lemon scent when crushed. The flowers are pendent and usually arranged singly on short side shoots on a pedicel 2–4 mm (0.079–0.157 in) long with linear to lance-shaped bracteoles 4–7 mm (0.16–0.28 in) long. The calyx is 3–10 mm (0.12–0.39 in) long and the corolla is pale green to pale yellow, cylindrical to funnel-shaped and 15–40 mm (0.59–1.57 in) long. The eight stamens extend well beyond the end of the corolla. Flowering occurs sporadically throughout the year but mainly in autumn and winter.

== Taxonomy ==
Correa glabra was first formally described in 1838 by botanist John Lindley in Thomas Mitchell's journal, Three Expeditions into the interior of Eastern Australia.

The names of three varieties are accepted by the Australian Plant Census:

- Correa glabra Lindl. var. glabra, has leaves that are more or less glabrous, a hemispherical calyx and pale green or yellow flowers;
- Correa glabra var. leucoclada (Lindl.) Paul G.Wilson has leaves that are densely woolly hairy on the lower surface, a cup-shaped to shortly cylindrical calyx and pale green or yellow flowers;
- Correa glabra var. turnbullii (Ashby) Paul G.Wilson has red flowers with green lobes.

Variety turnbullii was originally described by Edwin Ashby who gave it the name Correa turnbullii but Paul G. Wilson reduced it to a variety of C. glabra in 1998. Wilson considered C. schlechtendalii of Behr to be a synonym of var. turnbullii.

== Distribution and habitat ==
Rock correa is found in south-eastern Queensland, New South Wales, western Victoria and westwards to the Fleurieu Peninsula in South Australia. Variety glabra is found in south-eastern Queensland, New South Wales and central and western Victoria where it mainly grows in rocky habitats near watercourses. Variety leucoclada, commonly known as the white-stemmed smooth correa, grows in hilly situations along stream banks in the southern Mount Lofty Ranges and in central and eastern New South Wales. It is rare in South Australia but common in New South Wales. Variety turnbullii, commonly known as Turnbull's smooth correa, grows in the rocky hills of the Mount Lofty and Flinders Ranges, the Murraylands and part of the south-east of South Australia.

== Use in horticulture ==
Correa glabra may be used as a low screening shrub or as a container plant, and will attract birds to a garden. It will grow in a variety of soil types in sunny or partially shaded situations and withstands frost. It can be maintained to a compact shape by pinching back new growth.

A number of cultivars have been recorded, including:

- Corea glabra var. glabra 'Coliban River' — a compact, dense form selected from a wild population near the Coliban River in Kyneton, Victoria. It grows to 1.2 metres in height and width.
- C. glabra 'Apricot'
- C. glabra var. turnbullii 'Barossa Gold'
- C. glabra 'Gold Leaf'
- C. glabra var. turnbullii 'Ian Fardon'
- C. glabra var. glabra 'Inglewood Gold' — a form with gold flowers selected from a wild population near Inglewood, Victoria around 1980.
- C. glabra 'Studley Park'
- C. glabra var. leucoclada 'Tambar Springs'
