= Correa lawrenceana var. rosea =

Scientific classification
- Kingdom: Plantae
- Clade: Tracheophytes
- Clade: Angiosperms
- Clade: Eudicots
- Clade: Rosids
- Order: Sapindales
- Family: Rutaceae
- Genus: Correa
- Species: C. lawrenceana
- Variety: C. l. var. rosea

Trinomial name
- Correa lawrenceana var. rosea Paul G.Wilson

Synonyms
- Correa lawrenciana var. rosea Paul G.Wilson orth. var.

Variety of flowering plant

Correa lawrenceana var. rosea is a variety of Correa lawrenceana that is endemic to the Snowy Mountains of New South Wales. It is a shrub with narrow elliptical leaves and narrow cylindrical flowers that are pink or dull red with green lobes and covered with small, compact star-shaped hairs.

== Description ==
Correa lawrenceana var. rosea is a shrub that typically grows to a height of 3 m (9.8 ft). Its leaves are arranged in opposite pairs, narrow elliptical, up 60 60 mm (2.4 in) long, 5–13 mm (0.20–0.51 in) wide and covered with woolly hairs on the lower side. The flowers are usually arranged singly in leaf axils on a down-turned stalk 8–22 mm (0.31–0.87 in) long. The calyx is hemispherical to shortly cup-shaped, 3–5 mm (0.12–0.20 in) long, covered with woolly, rust-coloured hairs and with a wavy rim. The corolla is narrow cylindrical, 12–20 mm (0.47–0.79 in) long, pink to dull red with green lobes and covered with small, compact, star-shaped hairs.

== Taxonomy ==
The variety was first formally described in 1961 by Paul Wilson in the journal Nuytsia, from specimens collected by Joyce Vickery near the Geehi River in 1958.

== Distribution and habitat ==
This correa grows in forest in the Snowy Mountains of New South Wales.
