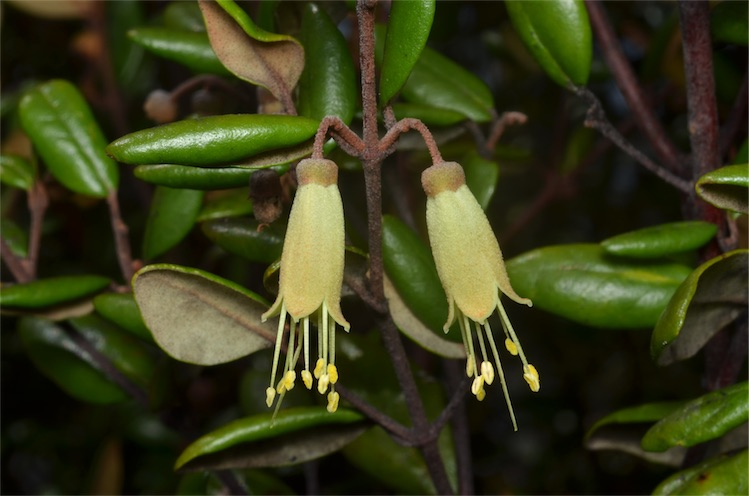
- In the Australian National Botanic Gardens

Scientific classification
- Kingdom: Plantae
- Clade: Tracheophytes
- Clade: Angiosperms
- Clade: Eudicots
- Clade: Rosids
- Order: Sapindales
- Family: Rutaceae
- Genus: Correa
- Species: C. lawrenceana
- Variety: C. l. var. lawrenceana

Trinomial name
- Correa lawrenceana var. lawrenceana Hook.

Synonyms
- Corraea ferruginea Hook. orth. var.; Correa ferruginea Backh.; Correa ferruginea Gunn ex Hook. nom. illeg., nom. superfl.; Correa lawrenceana var. ferruginea Hook.f.; Correa lawrenceana var. glabra Hook.f. nom. inval.; Correa lawrenceana var. glabra Benth.; Correa lawrenciana var. ferruginea Hook.f. orth. var.; Correa lawrenciana var. glabra Hook.f. orth. var.; Correa lawrenciana Hook. var. lawrenciana orth. var.; Correa lawrenciana var. typica Hochr. nom. inval.

= Correa lawrenceana var. lawrenceana =

Variety of flowering plant

Correa lawrenceana var. lawrenceana is the implicit autonym of Correa lawrenceana and is endemic to Tasmania. It is a shrub with papery, oblong leaves and pale green, narrow cylindrical flowers arranged singly on the ends of branchlets.

== Description ==
Correa lawrenceana var. lawrenceana is a shrub that typically grows to a height of 4 m (13 ft) and has papery, oblong leaves 20–40 mm (0.79–1.57 in) long, 3–30 mm (0.12–1.18 in) wide and sometimes covered with rust-coloured hairs on the lower surface. Specimens in the north-east of the state have narrow leaves, while those from the south and west have wider leaves with hairy undersides. The flowers are borne singly on the ends of branchlets on a stalk about 5 mm (0.20 in) long. The calyx is shortly cup-shaped, 3 mm (0.12 in) long and 4 mm (0.16 in) wide with rust-coloured hairs on the outside and with a wavy rim. The corolla is narrow cylindrical, 15–20 mm (0.59–0.79 in) long, pale green and covered with soft hairs. Flowering mostly occurs in spring.

== Taxonomy ==
Correa lawrenceana was first formally described in 1834 by William Jackson Hooker who published the description in his journal, The Journal of Botany. In 1855, his son Joseph Dalton Hooker described Correa lawrenceana var. glabra, implicitly creating the autonym C. lawrenceana var. lawrenceana.

== Distribution and habitat ==
This variety of C. lawrenceana grows in forest, mainly in mountainous areas in Tasmania, including on King Island. The variety is also listed as occurring in the Australian Capital Territory.
