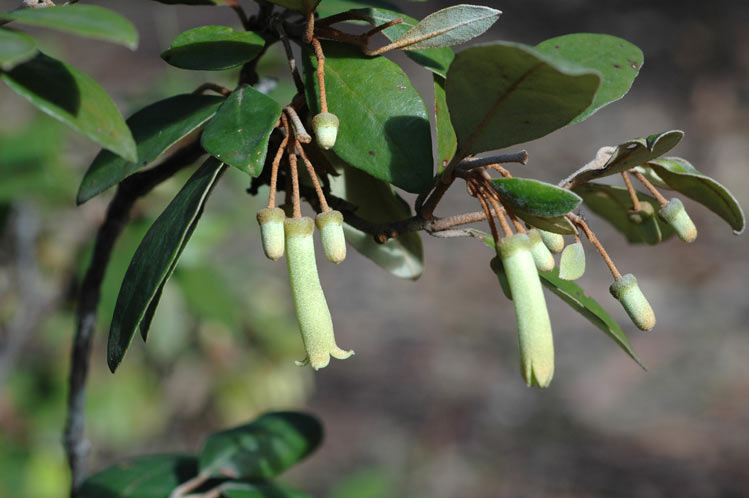
- Cultivated specimen in the ANBG

Scientific classification
- Kingdom: Plantae
- Clade: Tracheophytes
- Clade: Angiosperms
- Clade: Eudicots
- Clade: Rosids
- Order: Sapindales
- Family: Rutaceae
- Genus: Correa
- Species: C. lawrenceana
- Variety: C. l. var. glandulifera

Trinomial name
- Correa lawrenceana var. glandulifera Paul G.Wilson

Synonyms
- Correa lawrenciana var. glandulifera Paul G.Wilson orth.var.

= Correa lawrenceana var. glandulifera =

Mountain correa

Variety of flowering plant

Correa lawrenceana var. glandulifera, commonly known as the mountain correa, is a variety of Correa lawrenceana and is endemic to eastern Australia. It is a shrub or small tree with egg-shaped leaves and greenish yellow flowers arranged singly or in groups of up to five with woolly hairs on the outside.

== Description ==
Correa lawrenceana var. glandulifera is a shrub that typically grows to a height of 3–6 m (9.8–19.7 ft) or a tree to 12 m (39 ft) with egg-shaped to lance-shaped leaves 40–80 mm (1.6–3.1 in) long, 20–35 mm (0.79–1.38 in) wide and woolly- hairy on the lower surface. The flowers are borne singly or in groups of up to five on the ends of branchlets on a peduncle about 4 mm (0.16 in) long, each flower on a pedicel 4–10 mm (0.16–0.39 in) long. The calyx is hemispherical, about 2 mm (0.079 in) long with a wavy edge, and the corolla is narrow cylindrical, 22–27 mm (0.87–1.06 in) long, greenish yellow and woolly hairy on the outside. Flowering mainly occurs in spring.

== Taxonomy ==
The variety glandulifera was first formally described in 1961 by Paul Wilson in Transactions of the Royal Society of South Australia from specimens collected by Cyril Tenison White near Springbrook, Queensland at an altitude of 3,000 ft (910 m) in 1929.

== Distribution and habitat ==
This variety of C. lawrenceana grows on the margins of rainforest, in mountains from the Gibraltar Range in New South Wales to the McPherson Range in far south-eastern Queensland.
