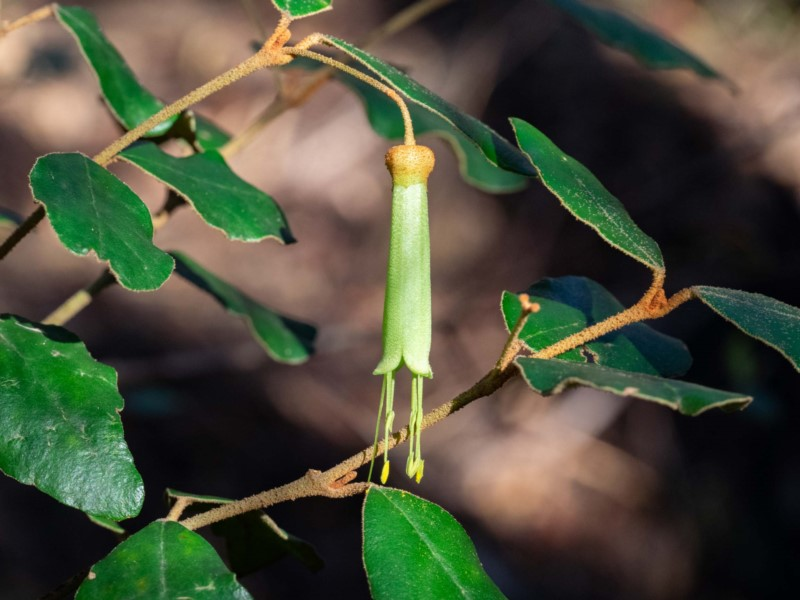
- In the Nadgee Nature Reserve

Scientific classification
- Kingdom: Plantae
- Clade: Tracheophytes
- Clade: Angiosperms
- Clade: Eudicots
- Clade: Rosids
- Order: Sapindales
- Family: Rutaceae
- Genus: Correa
- Species: C. lawrenceana
- Variety: C. l. var. latrobeana

Trinomial name
- Correa lawrenceana var. latrobeana (F.Muell. ex Hannaford) Paul G.Wilson

= Correa lawrenceana var. latrobeana =

Variety of flowering plant

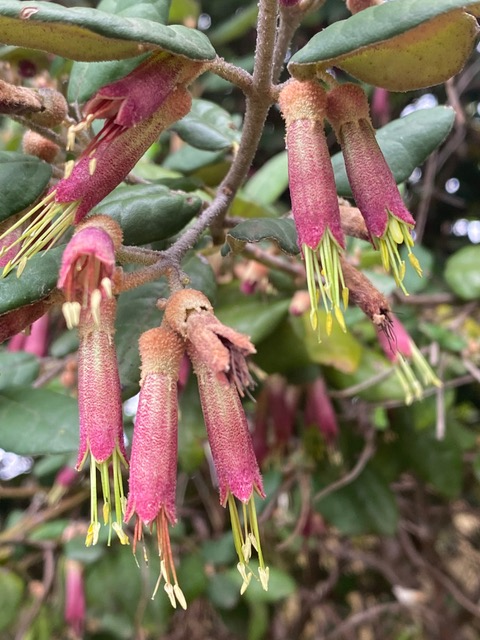
Correa lawrenceana var. latrobeana (reddish-mauve form)

Correa lawrenceana var. latrobeana is a variety of Correa lawrenceana that is endemic to south-eastern Australia. It is a shrub or small tree with elliptical to egg-shaped leaves and cylindrical, greenish-yellow or reddish-mauve flowers arranged singly or in groups of up to seven in leaf axils or on the ends of branchlets.

== Description ==
Correa lawrenceana var. latrobeana is a shrub that typically grows to a height of 3 m (9.8 ft) or a tree to 16 m (52 ft). Its leaves are elliptical to egg-shaped, arranged in opposite pairs, 24–65 mm (0.94–2.56 in) long and 7–34 mm (0.28–1.34 in) wide and covered with felt-like, cream- to rust-coloured hairs on the lower side. The flowers are arranged singly or in groups of up to seven in leaf axils and on the ends of branchlets on a stalk 7–25 mm (0.28–0.98 in) long. The calyx is cup-shaped, 4–7 mm (0.16–0.28 in) long, covered with woolly, rust-coloured hairs and with a wavy rim. The corolla is cylindrical, 25–30 mm (0.98–1.18 in) long and greenish-yellow or reddish-mauve. Flowering mostly occurs in spring.

== Taxonomy ==
This correa was first formally described in 1856 by Samuel Hannaford from an unpublished description by Ferdinand von Mueller. It was given the name Correa latrobeana and the description was published in Jottings in Australia: or, Notes on the flora and fauna of Victoria, with a catalogue of the more common plants, their habitats, and dates of flowering. In 1998, Paul Wilson reduced it to a variety of C. lawrenceana as C. lawrenceana var latrobeana in the journal Nuytsia.

== Distribution and habitat ==
This correa variety grows in forest or dense scrub, often along streams south from the Goulburn district in New South Wales to eastern Victoria where it is found n places including Buchan, Mount Buffalo, Mount Baw Baw, Warburton and Healesville then extending to the south-west of Melbourne as far as the Otway Ranges.
