= Correa glabra var. turnbullii =

Scientific classification
- Kingdom: Plantae
- Clade: Tracheophytes
- Clade: Angiosperms
- Clade: Eudicots
- Clade: Rosids
- Order: Sapindales
- Family: Rutaceae
- Genus: Correa
- Species: C. glabra
- Variety: C. g. var. turnbullii

Trinomial name
- Correa glabra var. turnbullii (Ashby) Paul G.Wilson

Synonyms
- Correa glabra var. turnbullii (Ashby) Paul G. Wilson; Correa schlechtendalii Behr; Correa turnbullii Ashby; Correa rubra var. turnbullii (Ashby) J.M.Black

Variety of plant

Correa glabra var. turnbullii, the narrow-bell correa, is a variety of Correa glabra, a shrub native to Australia. It grows to 1 to 2 metre high and wide, with branchlets sparsely covered with rust-brown hairs. Its leaves are up to 4.5 cm long and 1.2 cm wide and are dark green on the upper surface, while the lower surface is covered with hairs and pale grey. The pendent, tubular flowers are pink or red with green tips, appearing between April and August in their native range.

The subspecies occurs from Mount Lofty to the mallee scrub and the southern Flinders Ranges and the extreme north-west of Victoria.
