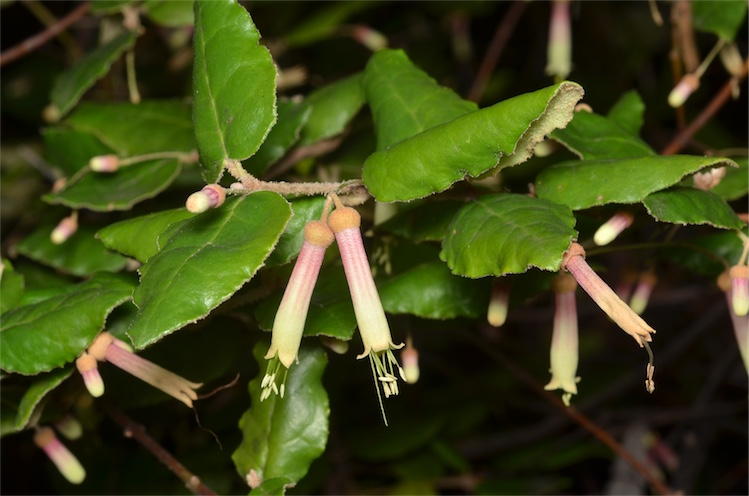
- Cultivated specimen in the A.C.T.

Scientific classification
- Kingdom: Plantae
- Clade: Tracheophytes
- Clade: Angiosperms
- Clade: Eudicots
- Clade: Rosids
- Order: Sapindales
- Family: Rutaceae
- Genus: Correa
- Species: C. lawrenceana
- Variety: C. l. var. cordifolia

Trinomial name
- Correa lawrenceana var. cordifolia Paul G.Wilson

Synonyms
- Correa lawrenciana var. cordifolia Paul G.Wilson orth.var.

= Correa lawrenceana var. cordifolia =

Pink mountain-correa

Variety of flowering plant

Correa lawrenceana var. cordifolia, commonly known as the pink mountain-correa, is a variety of Correa lawrenceana and is endemic to south-eastern Australia. It is a shrub with leathery, broadly egg-shaped to heart-shaped leaves, and pink flowers with yellowish tips arranged singly or in groups of two or three in leaf axils.

== Description ==
Correa lawrenceana var. cordifolia is a shrub that typically grows to a height of 1–5 m (3 ft 3 in – 16 ft 5 in) and has leathery, broadly egg-shaped to heart-shaped leaves 25–105 mm (0.98–4.13 in) long, 20–55 mm (0.79–2.17 in) wide and thinly felty on the lower surface. The flowers are borne singly in leaf axils on a peduncle 1–5 mm (0.039–0.197 in) long or in groups of two or three, each flower on a pedicel about 10 mm (0.39 in) long. The calyx is cup-shaped, 4–5 mm (0.16–0.20 in) long and hairy, and the corolla is cylindrical, 25–30 mm (0.98–1.18 in) long and pink with a yellowish tip, rarely all yellow. Flowering mostly occurs in spring.

== Taxonomy ==
The variety cordifolia was first formally described in 1961 by Paul Wilson in Transactions of the Royal Society of South Australia from specimens collected by Ernest Francis Constable on Mount Dromedary in 1953.

== Distribution and habitat ==
This variety of C. lawrenceana grows in forest, including rainforest, on the coast and nearby tablelands of New South Wales and the Australian Capital Territory and south from Lake Conjola and Braidwood, to the far north-eastern corner of Victoria.

== Conservation status ==
This variety is listed as "vulnerable" on the Department of Sustainability and Environment's Advisory List of Rare Or Threatened Plants In Victoria.
