= Correa lawrenceana var. genoensis =

Genoa River correa

Conservation status
- Endangered (EPBC Act)

Scientific classification
- Kingdom: Plantae
- Clade: Tracheophytes
- Clade: Angiosperms
- Clade: Eudicots
- Clade: Rosids
- Order: Sapindales
- Family: Rutaceae
- Genus: Correa
- Species: C. lawrenceana
- Variety: C. l. var. genoensis

Trinomial name
- Correa lawrenceana var. genoensis Paul G.Wilson

Synonyms
- Correa lawrenciana var. genoensis Paul G.Wilson orth.var.

Variety of flowering plant

Correa lawrenceana var. genoensis, commonly known as the Genoa River correa, is a variety of Correa lawrenceana and is endemic to south-eastern Australia. It is a shrub with egg-shaped leaves and yellowish green flowers usually arranged singly in leaf axils.

== Description ==
Correa lawrenceana var. genoensis is a shrub that typically grows to a height of 2 m (6 ft 7 in) and has egg-shaped leaves 24–65 mm (0.94–2.56 in) long, 7–34 mm (0.28–1.34 in) wide and more or less glabrous on the lower surface. The flowers are usually borne singly, sometimes in groups of up to seven, in leaf axils on stalks 7–25 mm (0.28–0.98 in) long with thread-like bracteoles. The calyx is urn-shaped, 9–12 mm (0.35–0.47 in) long and glabrous, and the corolla is narrow cylindrical, 17–25 mm (0.67–0.98 in) long and yellowish green. Flowering mostly occurs in spring.

== Taxonomy ==
The variety genoensis was first formally described in 1961 by Paul Wilson in Transactions of the Royal Society of South Australia from specimens collected by Ferdinand von Mueller on "flooded banks" of the Genoa River in 1860.

== Distribution and habitat ==
This variety of C. lawrenceana grows along the Genoa River and its tributaries near the New South Wales - Victoria border.

== Conservation status ==
This variety is listed as "endangered" under the Australian Government Environment Protection and Biodiversity Conservation Act 1999, the New South Wales Government Biodiversity Conservation Act 2016 and the Victorian Government Flora and Fauna Guarantee Act 1988. A National Recovery Plan has been prepared. The main threats to the species are the species' limited distribution, weed invasion, altered fire regimes and floods.
