= Correa lawrenceana var. macrocalyx =

Scientific classification
- Kingdom: Plantae
- Clade: Tracheophytes
- Clade: Angiosperms
- Clade: Eudicots
- Clade: Rosids
- Order: Sapindales
- Family: Rutaceae
- Genus: Correa
- Species: C. lawrenceana
- Variety: C. l. var. macrocalyx

Trinomial name
- Correa lawrenceana var. macrocalyx Paul G.Wilson

Synonyms
- Correa lawrenciana var. macrocalyx Paul G.Wilson orth.var.; Correa macrocalyx Blakely

Variety of flowering plant

Correa lawrenceana var. macrocalyx is a variety of Correa lawrenceana and is endemic to New South Wales. It is a shrub with leathery, egg-shaped to broadly egg-shaped leaves, and cylindrical, greenish yellow flowers arranged in leaf axils or on the ends of short branchlets.

== Description ==
Correa lawrenceana var. macrocalyx is a shrub that typically grows to a height of 1–4 m (3 ft 3 in – 13 ft 1 in) and has leathery, egg-shaped to broadly egg-shaped leaves 40–80 mm (1.6–3.1 in) long and 30–70 mm (1.2–2.8 in) wide with woolly hairs on the lower surface. The flowers are borne singly or in twos or threes in leaf axils or on the ends of short branchlets on stalks 20–57 mm (0.79–2.24 in) long. The calyx is deeply cup-shaped, 5–10 mm (0.20–0.39 in) long with a slightly wavy rim, and covered with rust-coloured hairs. The corolla is cylindrical, 20–30 mm (0.79–1.18 in) long and greenish yellow. Flowering mostly occurs in spring.

== Taxonomy ==
The variety was first formally described in 1929 by William Blakely in Proceedings of the Linnean Society of New South Wales from specimens he collected with David Shiress at Patonga in 1923. In 1961, Paul Wilson reduced it to a variety of C. lawrenceana.

== Distribution and habitat ==
This variety of C. lawrenceana has usually been recorded as growing on the edge of rainforest in mountainous places between the Taree-Kendall and the Illawarra regions of New South Wales.
