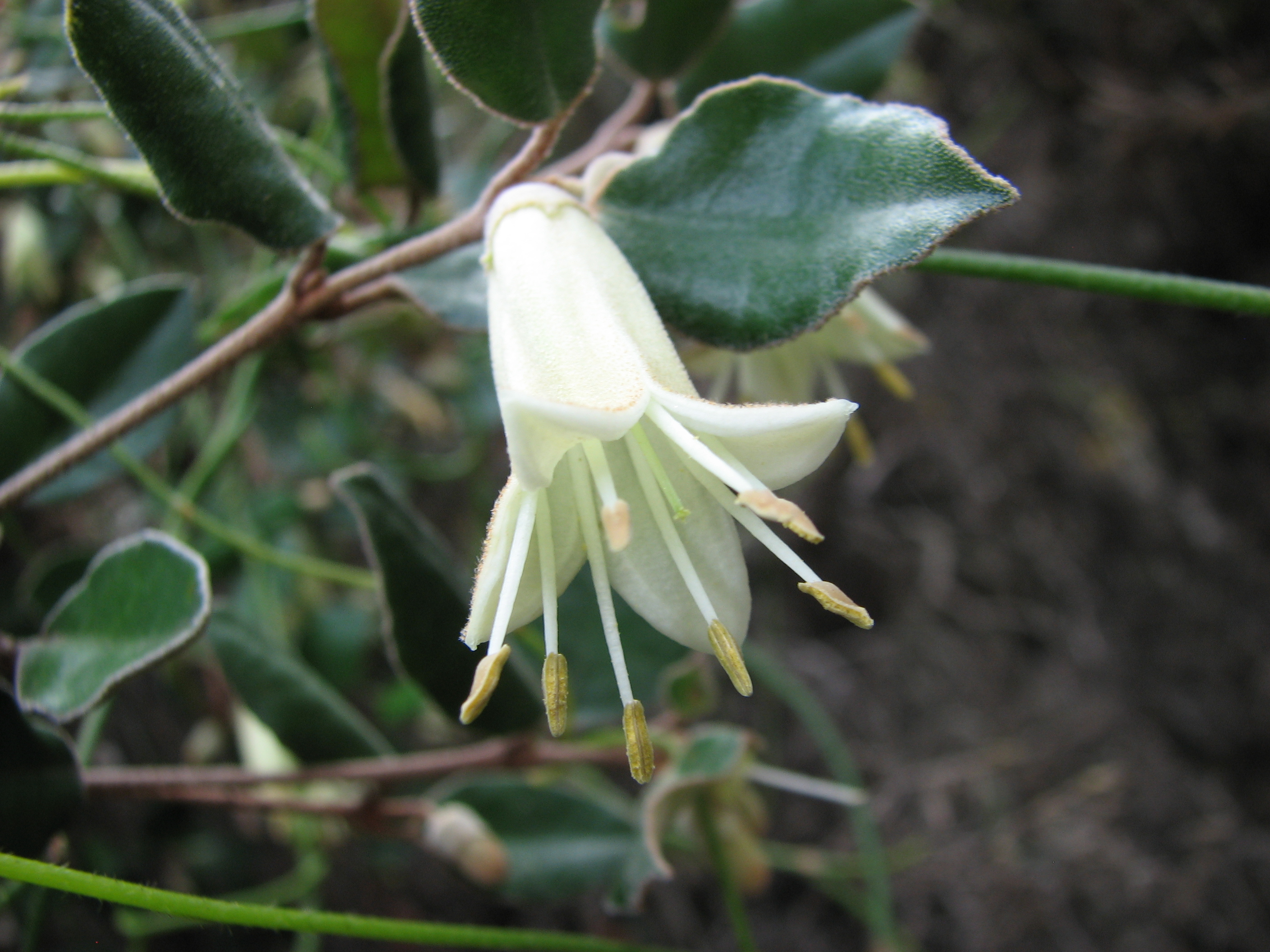
- Correa backhouseana var. backhouseana Cape Otway, Victoria

Scientific classification
- Kingdom: Plantae
- Clade: Tracheophytes
- Clade: Angiosperms
- Clade: Eudicots
- Clade: Rosids
- Order: Sapindales
- Family: Rutaceae
- Genus: Correa
- Species: C. backhouseana

Binomial name
- Correa backhouseana Hook.

Synonyms
- ? Correa backhouseana var. uniflora Regel; Correa backhousiana Hook. orth. var.; ? Correa backhousiana var. uniflora Regel orth. var.; Correa speciosa var. backhouseana (Hook.) Benth.; Correa speciosa var. backhouseana (Hook.) Rodway nom. superfl.

= Correa backhouseana =

Species of plant

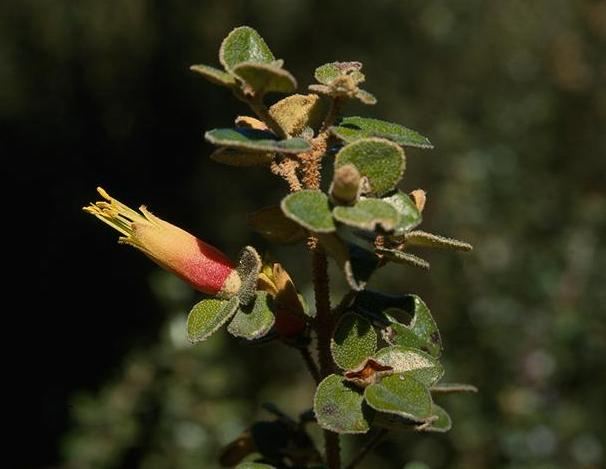
Var. orbicularis in the ANBG

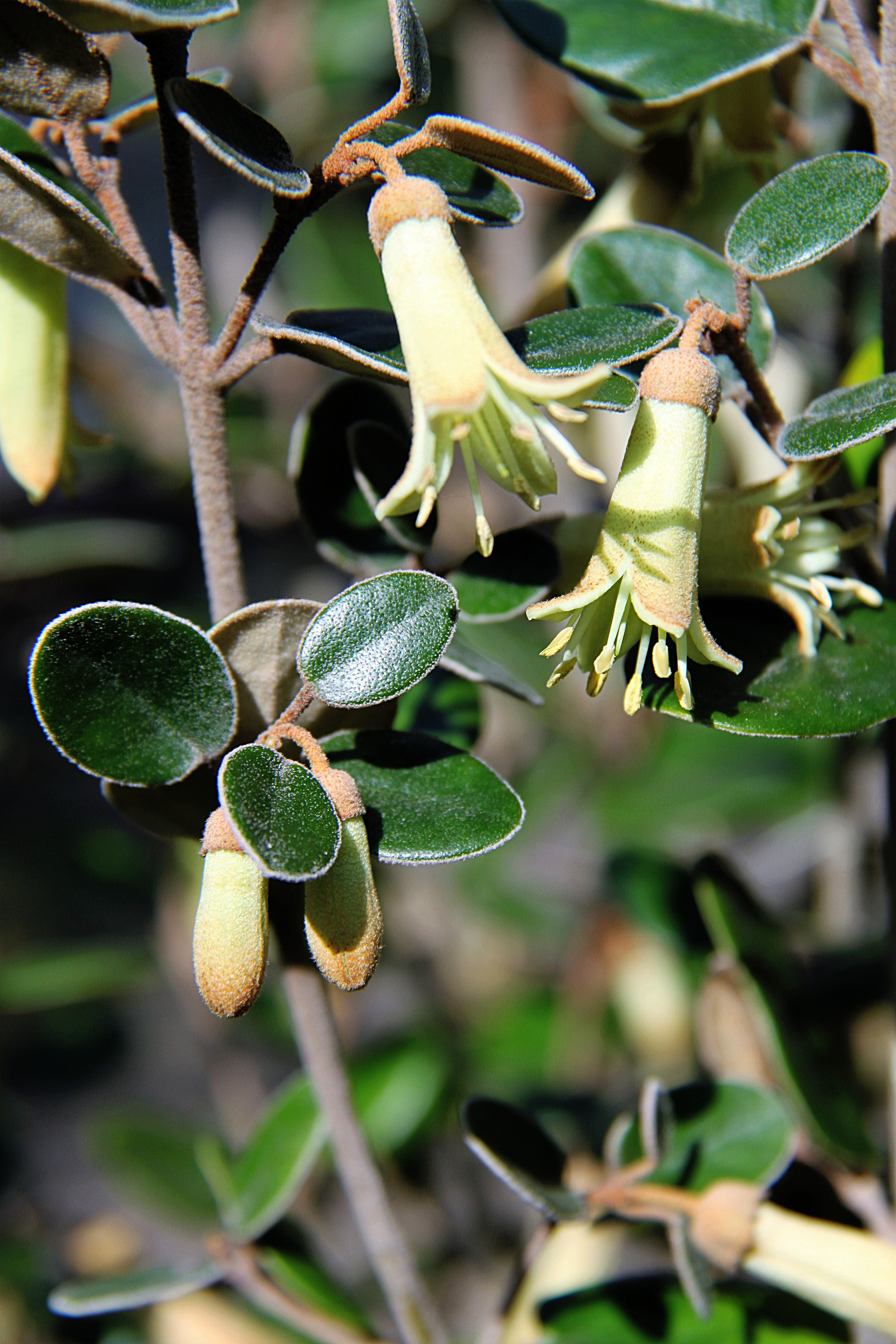

Correa backhouseana is a species of rounded shrub that is endemic to coastal and near-coastal areas of southern Australia. It has elliptical to egg-shaped or round leaves that are densely hairy on the lower surface, and cylindrical to funnel-shaped, cream-coloured to pale green or red and yellow flowers.

== Description ==
Correa backhouseana is a rounded shrub that typically grows to a height of 2 m (6 ft 7 in) with its young branchlets covered with woolly, rust-coloured hairs. The leaves are leathery, elliptical to egg-shaped or more or less round, mostly 15–25 mm (0.59–0.98 in) long on a short petiole. The upper surface of the leaves is more or less glabrous but the lower surface is densely covered with woolly hairs. The flowers are arranged singly or in groups of two or three on short side shoots and are usually pendent. The calyx is hemispherical, 2–7 mm (0.079–0.276 in) high and densely covered with woolly hairs. The petals are cream-coloured to pale green or red and yellow, 15–25 mm (0.59–0.98 in) long and form a cylindrical or funnel-shaped corolla. The eight stamens are slightly longer than the corolla.

== Taxonomy ==
Correa backhouseanas was first formally described in 1834 by botanist William Jackson Hooker in The Journal of Botany. The type specimen was collected by English botanist and missionary James Backhouse at Cape Grim in Tasmania in 1833.

The names of three varieties are accepted by the Australian Plant Census:

- Correa backhouseana Hook. var. backhouseana, commonly known as coast correa in Victoria and as velvet correa in Tasmania, has a cream-coloured corolla and egg-shaped to broadly egg-shaped or broadly elliptical leaves that are smooth on the upper surface;
- Correa backhouseana var. coriacea (Paul G.Wilson) Paul G.Wilson, commonly known as thick-leaf correa in South Australia, has egg-shaped leaves and a red corolla with yellowish tips on the lobes;
- Correa backhouseana var. orbicularis Paul G.Wilson, commonly known as the round-leaf Kangaroo Island correa has broadly egg-shaped to round leaves and a red corolla with yellowish tips on the lobes.

== Distribution and habitat ==
This correa occurs in Western Australia, South Australia, Victoria and Tasmania. Variety backhouseana usually grows on coastal dunes and among rocks in coastal Tasmania, the Bass Strait Islands and near Cape Otway in coastal Victoria. Variety coriacea grows on dunes and granite outcrops westwards from the Mount Lofty Ranges of South Australia and on limestone escarpments along the south-eastern coast of Western Australia. Variety orbicularis is endemic to Kangaroo Island in South Australia where it grows in coastal heath on sand, often over limestone.

== Conservation status ==
Correa backhouseana var. backhouseana is listed as "vulnerable" under the Victorian Government Advisory List of Rare Or Threatened Plants In Victoria - 2014.

== Use in horticulture ==
Correa backhouseana is a hardy plant down to −5 °C (23 °F). It is useful as a screening plant or along fencelines. It is also used as a container plant and its flowers and foliage can be used in floral arrangements. It prefers a position with some shade and will tolerate salt-laden winds and frost.

The cultivar Correa backhouseana var. coriacea 'Eucla Gold' has smaller, narrower, and more brightly coloured flowers than usual. It was selected from a wild population near Eucla, Western Australia and brought into cultivation in Victoria in 1988.

Correa backhouseana has gained the Royal Horticultural Society's Award of Garden Merit. In the UK it requires a sheltered location and some protection in winter.
