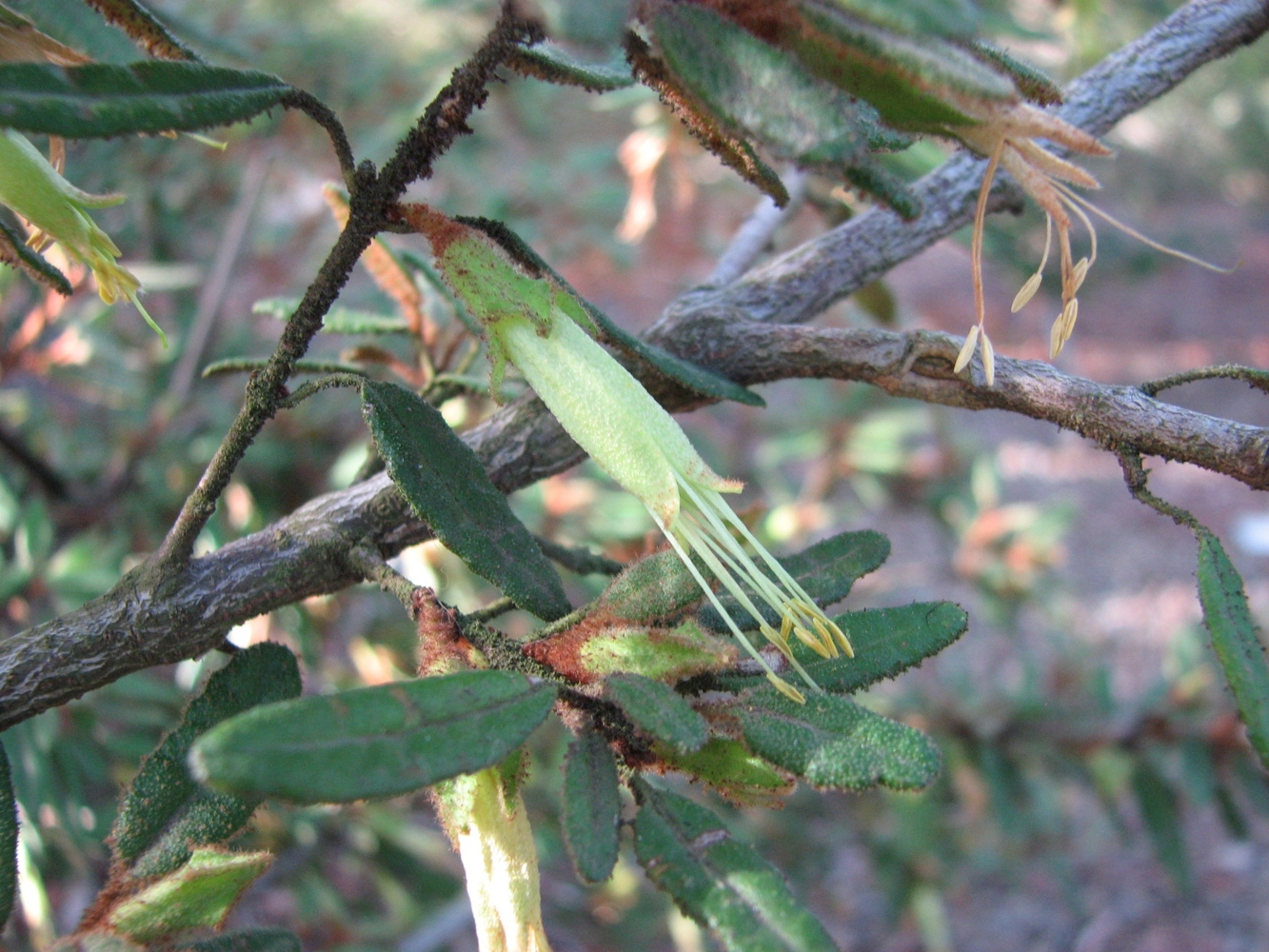
- Correa calycina in Maranoa Gardens

Conservation status
- Vulnerable (EPBC Act)

Scientific classification
- Kingdom: Plantae
- Clade: Tracheophytes
- Clade: Angiosperms
- Clade: Eudicots
- Clade: Rosids
- Order: Sapindales
- Family: Rutaceae
- Genus: Correa
- Species: C. calycina

Binomial name
- Correa calycina J.M.Black

= Correa calycina =

South Australian green correa

Species of plant

Correa calycina, commonly known as the South Australian green correa or Hindmarsh correa, is a species of tall, dense shrub that is endemic to a small area of South Australia. It has papery, oblong leaves and pendulous green flowers arranged singly on the ends of short side branches.

== Description ==
Correa calycina is a dense shrub that typically grows to 1–3 m (3 ft 3 in – 9 ft 10 in) high and 1–2 m (3 ft 3 in – 6 ft 7 in) wide with its branchlets covered with rust-coloured hairs. The leaves are narrow oblong to elliptic, 20–30 mm (0.79–1.18 in) long and 10–25 mm (0.39–0.98 in) wide on a petiole 3–6 mm (0.12–0.24 in) long. The flowers are borne singly on short side shoots on pedicels 2–4 mm (0.079–0.157 in) long. The calyx is green, top-shaped, square in cross-section and up to 15 mm (0.59 in) long with four lance-shaped lobes. The corolla is green ageing to mauve, pendulous, narrow cylindrical, up to 30 mm (1.2 in) long and densely covered with star-shaped hairs. The eight stamens are much longer than the petal tube.

== Taxonomy ==
Correa calycina was first formally described in 1925 by John McConnell Black in Transactions and Proceedings of the Royal Society of South Australia from specimens collected in the Hindmarsh Valley by John Burton Cleland.

Two varieties of C. calycina are accepted by the Australian Plant Census:

- Correa calycina J.M.Black var. calycina, has leaves that are sparsely to moderately densely covered with star-shaped hairs on the lower surface;
- Correa calycina var. halmaturorum Paul G.Wilson, commonly known as the De Mole River Correa, has leaves that are densely covered with star-shaped hairs on the lower surface. It was first formally described in 1998 by Paul Wilson in the journal Nuytsia.

== Distribution and habitat ==
The South Australian green correa occurs in a few isolated places on the southern Fleurieu Peninsula and on Kangaroo Island in South Australia where it usually grows on or near the banks of streams. Variety calycina occurs on the Fleurieu Peninsula near the Hindmarsh and Inman Rivers and Carrickalinga Creek. Variety halmaturorum is only known from along the De Mole River on Kangaroo Island, growing in Eucalyptus cladocalyx forest.

== Conservation status ==
Correa calycina is classified as "vulnerable" under the Australian Government Environment Protection and Biodiversity Conservation Act 1999 and the South Australian Government National Parks and Wildlife Act, 1972. The main threats to the species are competition from weeds, especially Montpelier broom (Genista monspessulana), blackberry (Rubus fruticosus) and willow (Salix) species. It is also threatened by land clearing and grazing by livestock.
