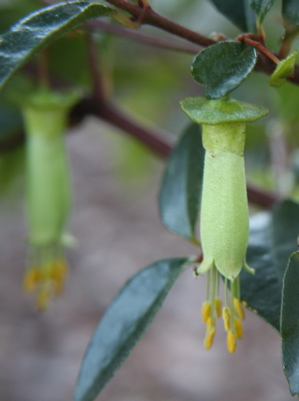

Conservation status
- Vulnerable (EPBC Act)

Scientific classification
- Kingdom: Plantae
- Clade: Tracheophytes
- Clade: Angiosperms
- Clade: Eudicots
- Clade: Rosids
- Order: Sapindales
- Family: Rutaceae
- Genus: Correa
- Species: C. baeuerlenii

Binomial name
- Correa baeuerlenii F.Muell.

Synonyms
- Correa bauerlenii F.Muell. orth. var.

= Correa baeuerlenii =

Chef's-hat correa

Species of flowering plant

Correa baeuerlenii, commonly known as chef's-hat correa, or chef's cap correa, is a species of dense, rounded shrub that is endemic to the south-east of New South Wales, Australia. It has egg-shaped leaves and pendulous, greenish yellow flowers usually arranged singly on short side branches.

== Description ==
Correa baeuerlenii is a dense, rounded shrub that typically grows to a height of 2.5 m (8 ft 2 in) with rust coloured hairs on its stems. Its leaves are narrow egg-shaped to egg-shaped or elliptical, 22–65 mm (0.87–2.56 in) long, 10–22 mm (0.39–0.87 in) wide, and more or less glabrous. The flowers are usually borne singly on short side branches on a pendulous pedicel 8–10 mm (0.31–0.39 in) long. The calyx is cylindrical, about 7 mm (0.28 in) long with a dilated base 9–13 mm (0.35–0.51 in) in diameter. The corolla is greenish yellow and tubular, 20–28 mm (0.79–1.10 in) long with four triangular lobes about 4 mm (0.16 in) long. The eight stamens extend beyond the end of the corolla. Flowering occurs sporadically throughout the year with a peak in spring, and the fruit is up to 9 mm (0.35 in) long, surrounded by the remains of the corolla.

== Taxonomy ==
Correa baeuerlenii was first formally described in 1884 by botanist Ferdinand von Mueller in Prodeedings of the Linnean Society of New South Wales from specimens collected "on stony banks of rivulets of the Upper Clyde" by William Baeuerlen.

== Distribution and habitat ==
Chef's-hat correa occurs in forested areas from Bega northwards to the Clyde River district, with populations occurring at Biamanga, Deua and Mimosa Rocks National Parks.

== Conservation status ==
This correa is list as "vulnerable" under the Australian Government Environment Protection and Biodiversity Conservation Act 1999 and the New South Wales Government Biodiversity Conservation Act 2016. The main threats to the species are habitat loss due to land clearing and inappropriate fire regimes.

== Use in horticulture ==
Correa baeuerlenii can be used as a container plant or for screening. The flowers attract birds and flowering branches can be used indoors for floral arrangements. The species prefers moist soils with good drainage. It requires some shade, making it suitable for planting under trees.
