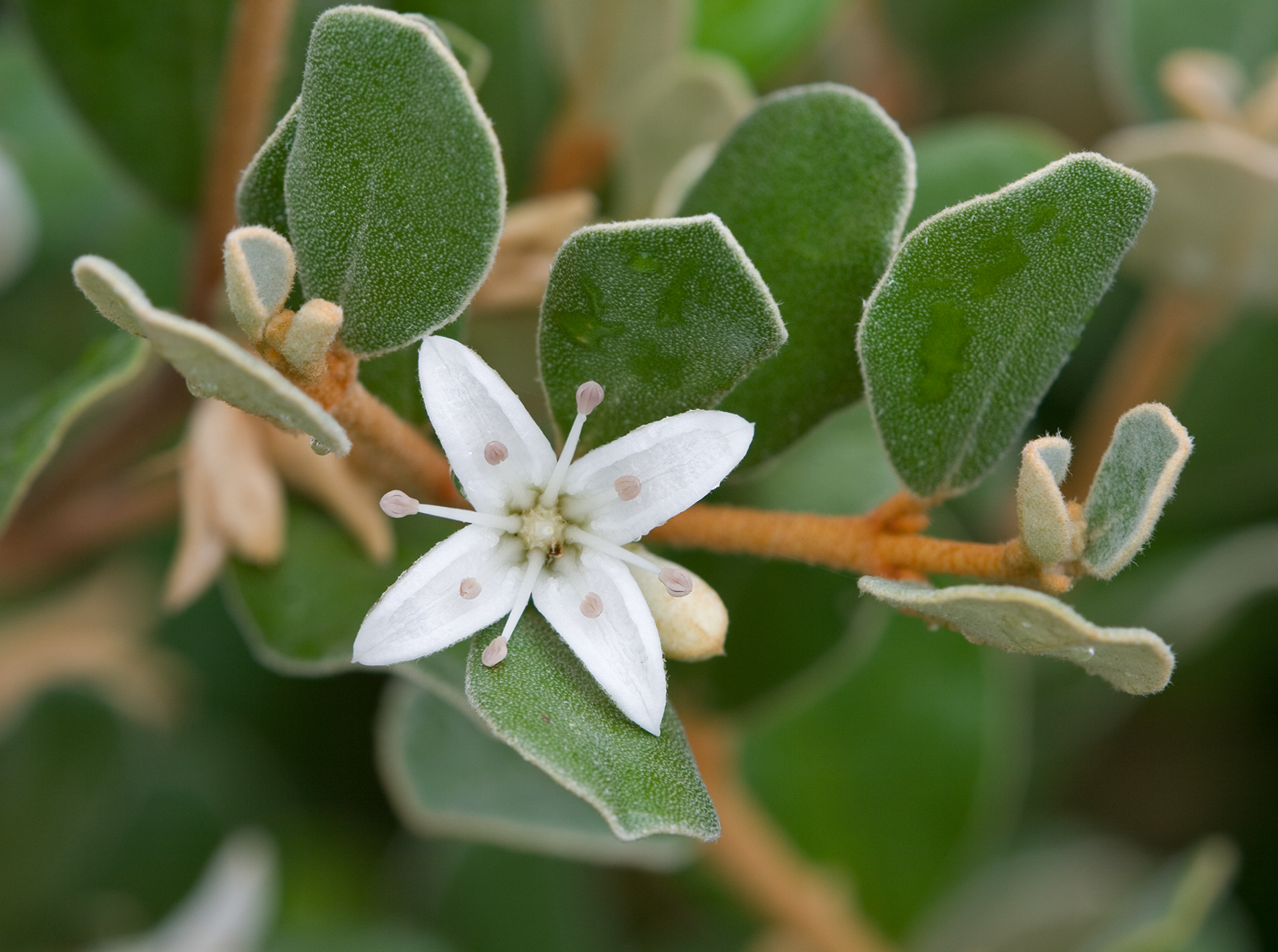
- In the Royal Tasmanian Botanical Gardens

Scientific classification
- Kingdom: Plantae
- Clade: Tracheophytes
- Clade: Angiosperms
- Clade: Eudicots
- Clade: Rosids
- Order: Sapindales
- Family: Rutaceae
- Genus: Correa
- Species: C. alba

Binomial name
- Correa alba Andrews

Synonyms
- Correa cotinifolia Salisb. nom. illeg.

= Correa alba =

White correa

Species of flowering plant

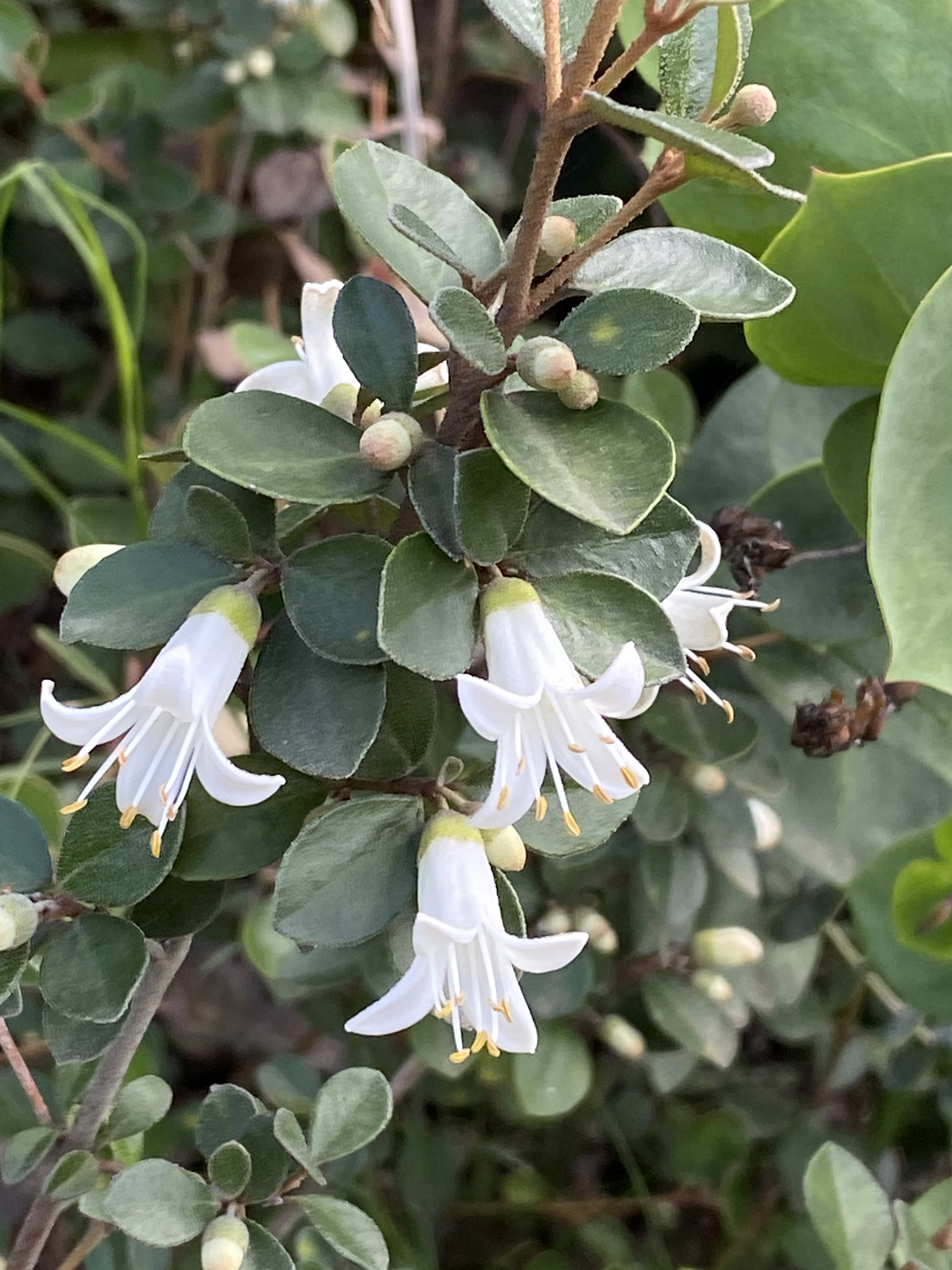
Correa alba 'St Andrews'

Correa alba, commonly known as white correa, is a species of shrub that is endemic to south-eastern Australia. It has egg-shaped to more or less circular leaves, erect white flowers arranged singly or in groups on short side branches, and green fruit.

== Description ==
Correa alba is a prostrate to spreading shrub that typically grows to a height of 1.5 m (4 ft 11 in) and has rust-coloured, woolly-hairy young stems. The leaves are leathery, elliptic to more or less round, 8–35 mm (0.31–1.38 in) long and 6–25 mm (0.24–0.98 in) wide on a petiole 0.5–1.5 mm (0.020–0.059 in) long. The lower side of the leaves is densely covered with woolly hairs. The flowers are arranged singly or in groups of up to five on the ends of short side branches on pedicels 0.5–5 mm (0.020–0.197 in) long. The calyx is cup-shaped or hemispherical and 2–4 mm (0.079–0.157 in) long with four lobes. The petals are white, rarely pale pink, 11–13 mm (0.43–0.51 in) long, woolly hairy on the back and spreading more or less free from each other. The eight stamens are shorter than the petals. Flowering mainly occurs from April to June and the fruit is 5–7 mm (0.20–0.28 in) long and green.

== Taxonomy ==
Correa alba was first formally described by Henry Cranke Andrews in 1798 in his book,The Botanist's Repository for New, and Rare Plants.

The Australian Plant Census accepts the names of two varieties:

- Correa alba Andrews var. alba has woolly hairs pressed against the lower surface of the leaves, and pedicels 2.5–5 mm (0.098–0.197 in) long;
- Correa alba var. pannosa Paul G.Wilson has thick, woolly to felt-like hairs on the lower surface of the leaves and pedicels 0.5–1.5 mm (0.020–0.059 in) long.

== Distribution and habitat ==
White correa occurs in South Australia, New South Wales, Victoria and Tasmania. In New South Wales it grows in sandy and rocky areas in near coastal areas south from Port Stephens. In Victoria it is common in coastal heath and woodland, extending to the far south east of South Australia. In Tasmania it is common on exposed rocky and sandy areas on the north and east coasts.

Variety alba occurs from Port Stephens and along the coasts of New South Wales and as far west as Cape Otway in Victoria. It is also the variety occurring in Tasmania. Variety pannosa is found along the south-west coast of Victoria and as far east as the Encounter Bay region of South Australia.

== Ecology ==
Wombats have been known to eat the leaves and roots.

== Uses ==
=== In horticulture ===
Correa alba is a hardy species in well-drained situations and withstands coastal exposure. A position in full sun is best for flowering, but it can also be grown in part shade. It may be used to create an informal hedge or as a container plant.

=== In food ===
The 1889 book 'The Useful Native Plants of Australia records that common names included " Cape Barren Tea" in Tasmania, and that "The leaves of this plant have been used by the sealers on the islands in Bass's Straits as a substitute for tea."
