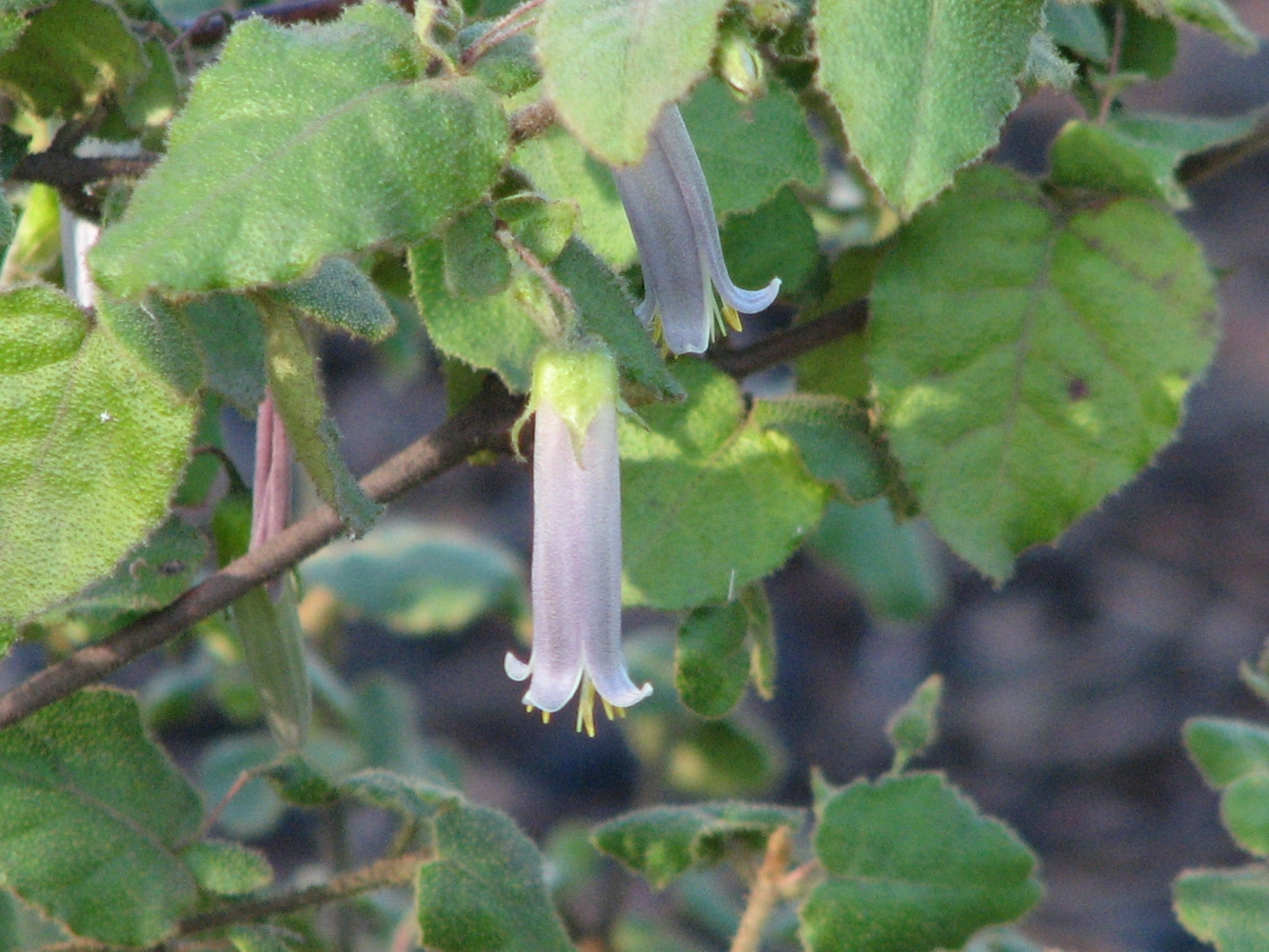
- In Royal Botanic Gardens, Melbourne

Scientific classification
- Kingdom: Plantae
- Clade: Tracheophytes
- Clade: Angiosperms
- Clade: Eudicots
- Clade: Rosids
- Order: Sapindales
- Family: Rutaceae
- Genus: Correa
- Species: C. aemula

Binomial name
- Correa aemula (Lindl.) F.Muell.

Synonyms
- Corraea aemula F.Muell. nom. inval., nom. nud.; Correa affinis Ashby; Correa speciosa var. hilii A.D.Chapm. orth. var.; Correa speciosa var. hillii Anon. nom. inval., nom. nud.; Correa speciosa var. hillii Anon.; Correa speciosa var. hillii Guilf.; Didimeria aemula Lindl.; Didymeria aemula F.Muell. orth. var.; Sida correoides A.Cunn. ex T.Mitch.

= Correa aemula =

Hairy correa

Species of plant

Correa aemula, commonly known as the hairy correa, is a species of shrub that is endemic to south-eastern Australia. It has broadly heart-shaped leaves arranged in opposite pairs, green or greyish green, pendent flowers arranged singly or in pairs and ageing to mauve-purple.

== Description ==
Correa aemula is an erect to spreading shrub that typically grows to a height of 2.5 m (8 ft 2 in) and has woolly-hairy branches. The leaves are papery, broadly heart-shaped, 10–60 mm (0.39–2.36 in) long and 5–35 mm (0.20–1.38 in) wide on a petiole 4–6 mm (0.16–0.24 in) long and covered with star-shaped hairs. The flowers are arranged singly, sometimes in pairs, in leaf axils or on the ends of short shoots, each on a pendent pedicel 5–30 mm (0.20–1.18 in) long. The calyx is cup-shaped with four lance-shaped lobes 4–8 mm (0.16–0.31 in) long. The petals are fused for most of their length, forming a cylindrical corolla 15–30 mm (0.59–1.18 in) long and green or greyish gren, fading to mauve-purple. The eight stamens extend slightly beyond the end of the petal tube. Flowering occurs in spring and summer.

== Taxonomy ==
The hairy correa was first formally described in 1838 by botanist John Lindley in Thomas Mitchell's book, Three Expeditions into the interior of Eastern Australia. Lindley gave the plant the name Didimeria aemula, but in 1858, Ferdinand von Mueller, changed the name to Correa aemula in his book Fragmenta phytographiae Australiae.

== Distribution and habitat ==
Correa aemula occurs on sandy or rocky soils in open forests and heathy woodlands in the Mount Lofty Ranges and Kangaroo Island in South Australia and the Grampians in Victoria. Hybrids with Correa decumbens and Correa reflexa have been recorded.
