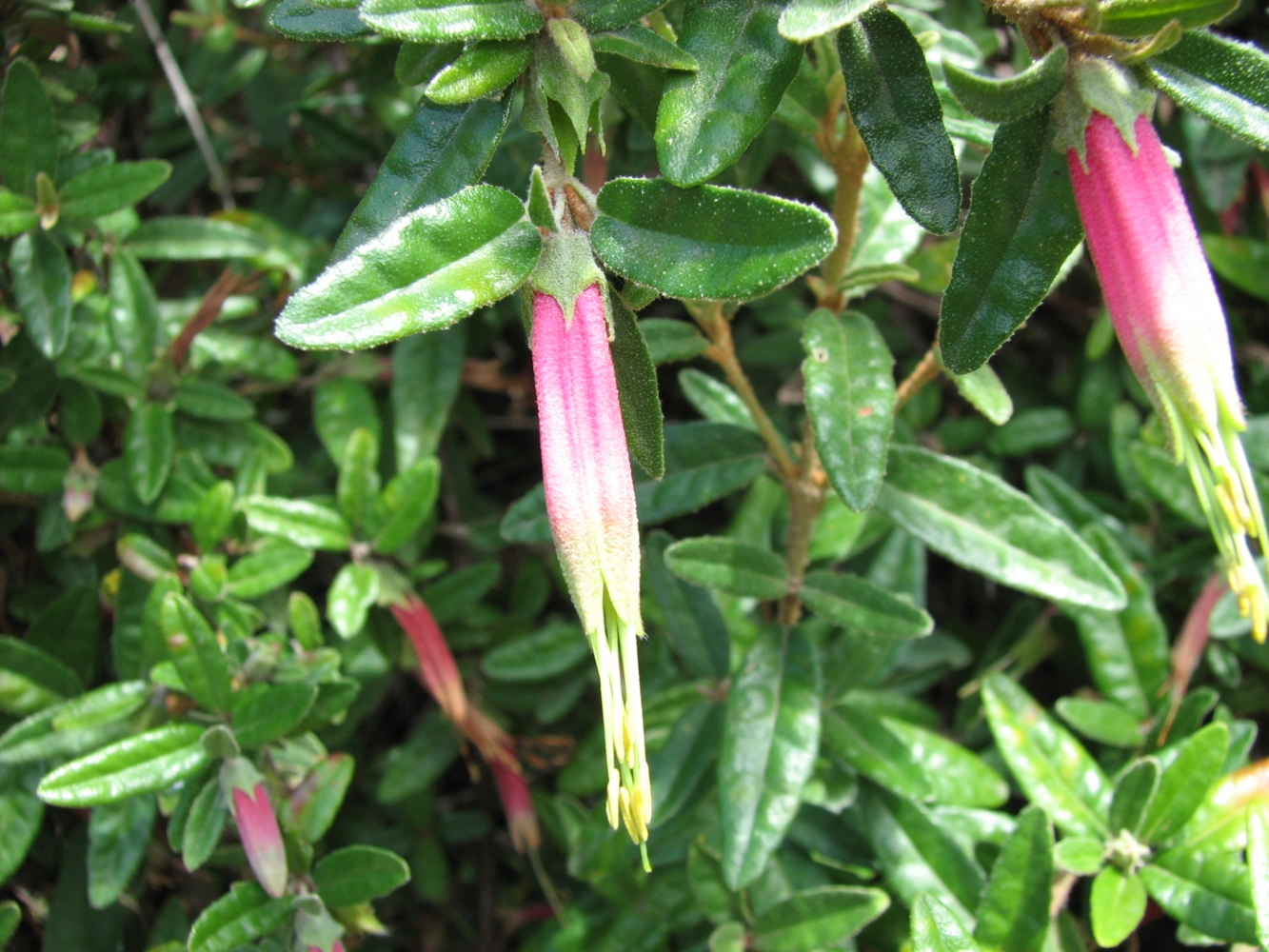
- Correa decumbens in Monash University grounds

Scientific classification
- Kingdom: Plantae
- Clade: Tracheophytes
- Clade: Angiosperms
- Clade: Eudicots
- Clade: Rosids
- Order: Sapindales
- Family: Rutaceae
- Genus: Correa
- Species: C. decumbens

Binomial name
- Correa decumbens F.Muell.

Synonyms
- Corraea decumbens F.Muell. orth. var.

= Correa decumbens =

Spreading correa

Species of plant

Correa decumbens, commonly known as the spreading correa, is a species of prostrate to spreading shrub that is endemic to South Australia. It has narrow oblong to narrow elliptical leaves and narrow cylindrical, pink to red flowers with green lobes.

== Description ==
Correa decumbens is a prostrate to spreading shrub that typically grow to a height of 1 m (3 ft 3 in) with its branchlets covered with reddish brown hairs. The leaves are narrow oblong to narrow elliptical, mostly 20–50 mm (0.79–1.97 in) long and 5–10 mm (0.20–0.39 in) wide on a petiole 3–5 mm (0.12–0.20 in) long. The upper surface of the leaves is glabrous and the lower surface is covered with woolly, rust-coloured hairs. The flowers are usually arranged singly on the ends of short side shoots on pedicels 5–10 mm (0.20–0.39 in) long with linear to spatula-shaped bracts 5–10 mm (0.20–0.39 in) at the base. The calyx is hemispherical to cup-shaped, 2–4 mm (0.079–0.157 in) long and hairy, with eight linear lobes 3–7 mm (0.12–0.28 in) long. The corolla is narrow cylindrical, pink to red with four green lobes, 18–27 mm (0.71–1.06 in) long. The eight stamens extend well beyond the end of the corolla. Flowering occurs between November and February as well from April to August in the species' native range.

== Taxonomy ==
Correa decumbens was first formally described in 1855 by botanist Ferdinand von Mueller in Transactions and Proceedings of the Victorian Institute for the Advancement of Science from plants growing "on the cataracts towards Mount Lofty, and on the banks of the Onkaparinga in South Australia".

== Distribution and habitat ==
Spreading correa occurs on the southern Mount Lofty Ranges where it grows in forest dominated by stringybark and on Kangaroo Island where it grows in forest dominated by sugar gum (Eucalyptus cladocalyx).
